= A50 road =

Road in England

A50

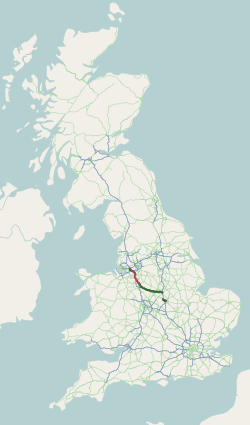

Route information
- Length: 98.2 mi (158.0 km)
- History: 1984-85 (Construction start and end)

Major junctions
- Southeast end: A6 in Leicester
- A46 in Groby M1 in Markfield; A6 near Aston-on-Trent; A52 in Hanley; A53 in Hanley; A34 in Church Lawton; A54 in Holmes Chapel; M6 near Grappenhall A56 in Grappenhall
- North end: A49 at Warrington

Location
- Country: United Kingdom
- Counties: Leicestershire; Derbyshire; Staffordshire; Cheshire
- Primary destinations: Stoke on Trent; Uttoxeter; Derby

Road network
- Roads in the United Kingdom; Motorways; A and B road zones
← A49	→ A51

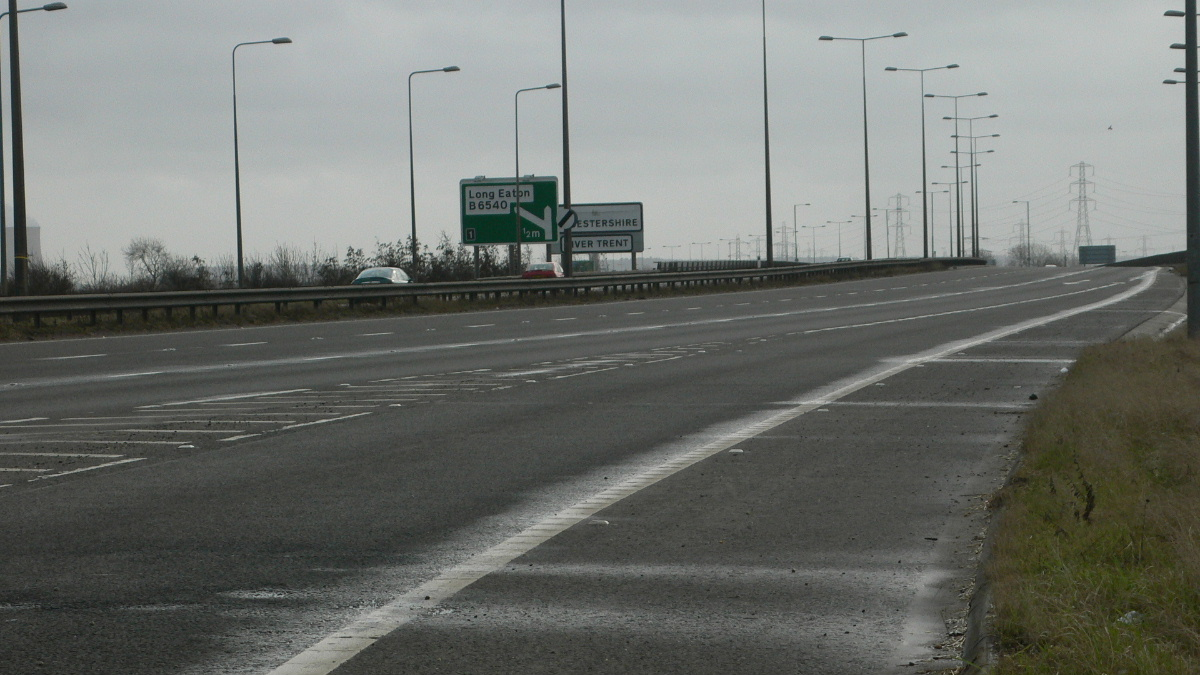
A50 west of junction 5

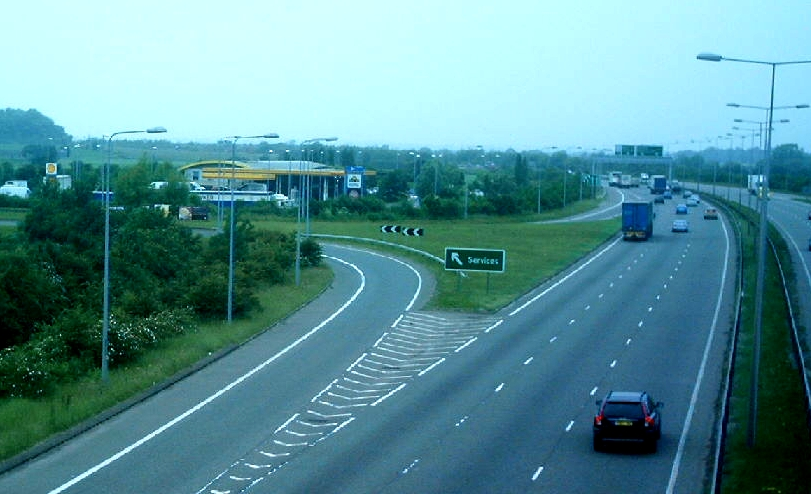
Welcome Break Services on Derby Southern Bypass.

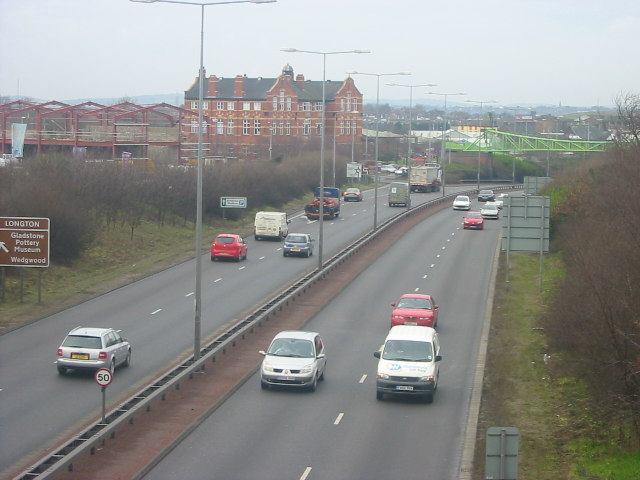
A50 close to Stoke-on-Trent.

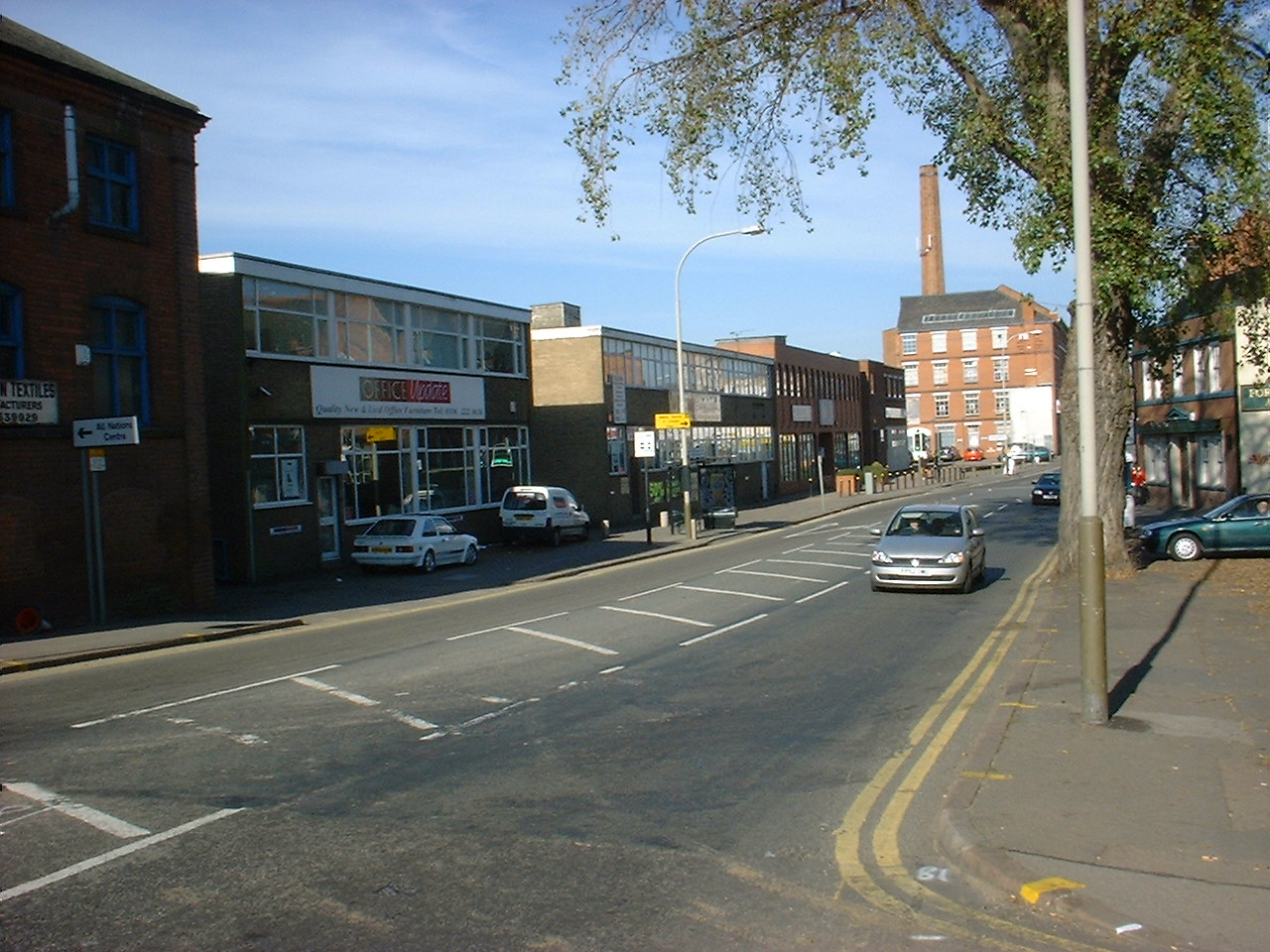
The A50 passing through Frog Island, Leicester

The A50 is a major trunk road in England between Leicester and Warrington; historically it was the designation for a major route from London to Leicester.

The A50 runs west-northwest from Leicester to the M1. After a northbound concurrency, the A50 departs the M1.

The segment of the A50 from the M1 west-northwest to Stoke-on-Trent is dual carriageway, mostly built to near-motorway standards and providing access to Derby; in Stoke, it connects with other near-motorways, providing two direct connections to the M6.

The A50 departs the near-motorway within Stoke, travelling northwest as a mostly single carriageway route, ultimately terminating in Warrington.

== Route ==
=== From Leicester into Stoke ===
The A50 runs from the City of Leicester to junction 22 of the M1 at Markfield. From there the route is concurrent with the M1 until it departs at the M1's junctions 24 and 24A near Kegworth.

The A50 then travels west-northwest as a near-motorway standard (lacking hard shoulders) dual carriageway. Crossing from Leicestershire into Derbyshire, the route runs south of the city of Derby.

Losing full access control, the route continues through Derbyshire into Staffordshire with a mix of interchanges and at-grade roundabouts.

Just before reaching Stoke-on-Trent, the A50 resumes its controlled-access, near-motorway status.

South of the city centre, the A50 exits the near-motorway, becoming a mostly single carriageway route. However, a spur of the A50 continues on the near-motorway toward the A500.

=== A50 Spur ===
The A50 Spur, which seems to also be designated on signs as the A50, travels to the Trentham Lakes North Junction, which provides access to the Bet365 Stadium. It then reaches a roundabout interchange with the near-motorway A500, which is grade-separated at the junction; the A500 provides direct access to junction 15 of the M6 southwest of Stoke and to junction 16 of the M6 northwest of Stoke.

=== From Stoke to Warrington ===
The A50 (the single carriageway, non-spur route) travels mainly northwest through the city centre of Stoke. Travelling through and departing Stoke, the A50 travels through Kidsgrove then, in Cheshire, Holmes Chapel and Knutsford. The route then meets the M6 at that motorway's junction 20. Continuing northwest, the A50 terminates in Warrington.

=== Notes ===
The Derby-and-Stoke section was originally intended to be part of an M64 motorway but this project was cancelled in the 1970s.

== Proposed development ==
In November 2013 it was reported that funding would be being made available for improvements to the section around Uttoxeter, with work starting no later than 2015/16. A few days earlier the MP was lobbying for the improvements, stating that improvements were needed to the traffic islands for safety reasons and to improve traffic flow. There are plans for 700 new houses to the west of Uttoxeter and to the south of the A50.

== History ==
=== Original route ===
Prior to the opening of the M1, the A50 route was one of two main routes from London to the north-west via Leicester, until it was replaced during the 19th century by what has become the A6. A third route between London and Leicester was via the A5 to Old Stratford, A508 to Market Harborough and thence the A6. That route and the A50 route both passed through Northampton which was a significant calling point on many coaching routes until the arrival of the railways.

Until the M1 opened, the A50 used to terminate at Hockliffe in Bedfordshire at a junction with the A5.

When the M1 motorway opened alongside the old route south of Northampton it was down-classified as:

- B526 between Northampton and the Newport Pagnell bypass.
- A509 between the Newport Pagnell bypass and Junction 14 of the M1.
- A5130 between Junction 14 and Woburn
- A4012 between Woburn and Hockcliffe.

From that point until the 1990s the southern point of the A50 was at a junction with the A508 in Kingsthorpe, Northampton.

In the 1990s, with the opening of the A14 and to discourage traffic from using the road between Leicester and Northampton, the old route was re-designated as A5199 between Leicester and Northampton.

At the same time the A50 became the A511 north of Leicester, between Burton upon Trent and Ashby-de-la-Zouch to Leicester when the dual carriageway section bypassing Derby was completed.

=== Modern route ===
Part of the route mirrored the plans for the original M64 motorway, with three lanes in some sections – notably between Kegworth and the A6 near Derby.

The new A50 route was opened in stages between March 1985 and 1999, with using various temporary designations:

- 1985: 9-mile (14 km) £16 million Blythe Bridge – Uttoxeter section from the north-west.
- 1992: £2.6M Etwall bypass, opened as the A516.
- 1995: 6-mile (9.7 km) £30.4M Hatton, Hilton and Foston bypass, opened by John Watts as the A564.
- 1997 (June): 3-mile (4.8 km) £52M section 1 of Blythe Bridge – Queensway.
- 1997 (September): the £109.5M 14.9-mile (24.0 km) Derby Southern Bypass (opened by Helene Hayman, Baroness Hayman, Minister for Roads at the DETR), as the A564.
- 1997 (September): The A6 Derby Spur.
- 1997 (November): the 1-mile (1.6 km) £21M section 2 of Blythe Bridge – Queensway.
- 1998: 5-mile (8.0 km) £20.6M Doveridge Bypass as the A564.
- 1999: the delayed A50/M1 junction 24a improvements.

On completion, the Southern Derby Bypass was re-designated as the A50, being maintained privately by Connect A50 Ltd. Much of this new section of road is made of concrete.

== Junction list ==
County	Location	mi	km	Jct	Destinations	Notes
Leicestershire	Leicester	0.0	0.0		A6 (St Margaret's Way) – City centre, Loughborough	Southeastern terminus
Leicestershire	Leicester	1.8	2.9		A563 (New Parks Way / Glenfrith Way) – Leicester (S & N), Glenfield	Groby Road Roundabout
Leicestershire	Groby	3.2	5.1		A46 to M1 south / M69 – Newark, Anstey, Leicester (N)	A50 passes through roundabout; Leicester signed southbound only; A46 roundabout interchange (The Brantings Roundabout)
Leicestershire	Groby	3.5	5.6	—	Anstey Lane – Anstey	Southeastbound exit and entrance
Leicestershire	Groby	4.0– 4.4	6.4– 7.1	—	Newtown Linford Lane – Groby village centre, Newtown Linford	Southeastbound exit and entrance, northwestbound entrance from Markfield Road
Leicestershire	Markfield	7.2– 7.5	11.6– 12.1	—	Whitwick Road to B591 – Shepshed, Markfield, Copt Oak, Whitwick	Partial cloverleaf interchange type B3
Leicestershire	Markfield	7.9	12.7		M1 south – The South, London A511 west (Little Shaw Lane) / Cliffe Lane – Ashby, Coalville, Stanton, Thornton	Roundabout interchange; southeastern terminus of M1 concurrency; eastern terminus of A511; M1 junction 22 (Markfield Interchange)
Leicestershire	Markfield	7.9	12.7	Beginning of controlled-access		
Leicestershire		7.9– 18.4	12.7– 29.6	See M1 junctions 22-24A		
Leicestershire	Kegworth– Lockington boundary	18.4– 19.9	29.6– 32.0	—	M1 north – The North, Nottingham (N) A453 (A6 south) – Nottingham (S); Quarry; KSG shooting ground	The North signed northbound only; northwestern terminus of M1 concurrency; southeastern terminus of A6 concurrency; M1 junction 24-24A; southeastbound exit-only for quarry and shooting ground
Leicestershire	Hemington– Castle Donington boundary	20.4– 21.0	32.8– 33.8	1	B6540 – Long Eaton, Hemington, Lockington, Shardlow, Castle Donington, Sawley	Roundabout interchange; Hemington and Lockington signed northwestbound only
Derbyshire	Aston-on-Trent	21.8	35.1	—	Shardlow Gravel Pit	No southeastbound exit
Derbyshire	Shardlow	22.4– 22.6	36.0– 36.4	Derby South services		
Derbyshire	Aston-on-Trent	23.5– 24.1	37.8– 38.8	2	A6 north – Derby, Alvaston, Shardlow	Trumpet interchange; Shardlow signed southeast only; northwestern terminus of A6 concurrency
Derbyshire	Swarkestone– Chellaston, Derby boundary	25.7– 26.1	41.4– 42.0	3	A514 to B587 – Swadlincote, Melbourne, Chellaston, Swarkestone, Allenton	Roundabout interchange
Derbyshire	Willington– Burnaston– Etwall boundary	31.0– 31.8	49.9– 51.2	4	A38 / B5008 to M1 – Birmingham, Burton upon Trent, Derby, Toyota, Willington	Three-level stacked roundabout interchange; Derby with Burton services on roundabout
Derbyshire	Etwall	32.3– 32.4	52.0– 52.1	—	Toyota Despatch Yard	Southeastbound exit and entrance
Derbyshire	Hilton	33.5– 34.1	53.9– 54.9	5	A516 east – Derby, Etwall, Hilton, Hatton	Dumbbell interchange; western terminus of A516
Derbyshire	Foston and Scropton	37.3	60.0	—	A511 east – Burton upon Trent, Foston, Scropton, Hatton, Tutbury	Folded diamond interchange with roundabouts; Foston signed northwest only, Tutbury southeast only; western terminus of A511; northwest slip road provides direct access to Uttoxeter Road, southeast slip road provides direct access to Watery Lane
Derbyshire	Foston and Scropton	38.1	61.3	—	Foston, Boylestone	Southeastbound exit and entrance
Derbyshire	Foston and Scropton	38.4	61.8	—	HM Prison Foston Hall	Northwestbound exit and entrance
Derbyshire	Sudbury	39.3	63.2	End of controlled-access		
Derbyshire	Sudbury	39.3	63.2		A515 south / Aston Lane – Lichfield, Sudbury, Kings Bromley, Aston, Aston Heath	Roundabout; Aston and Aston Heath signed southeast only; southeastern terminus of A515 concurrency
Derbyshire	Sudbury	40.3– 40.7	64.9– 65.5	—	A515 north – Ashbourne, Cubley, Doveridge	Dumbbell interchange; Doveridge signed northwest only; northwestern terminus of A515 concurrency
Derbyshire	Doveridge	42.9	69.0	—	Doveridge	Southeastbound exit and northwestbound entrance
Staffordshire	Uttoxeter	44.1	71.0		To A518 – Stafford, Uttoxeter	Roundabout
Staffordshire	Uttoxeter	44.9	72.3		A518 west / B5030 – Uttoxeter, Rocester, Ashbourne, Stafford	Roundabout; Uttoxeter signed northwest only; eastern terminus of A518
Staffordshire	Uttoxeter	45.7– 46.1	73.5– 74.2	—	A522 – Uttoxeter, Upper Tean, Cheadle	Dumbbell interchange
Staffordshire	Forsbrook	53.4	85.9		A521 north – Tean, Blythe Bridge, Cheadle	Roundabout; Blythe Bridge and Cheadle signed northwest only; instead of passing through, A50 enters from the southeast, exits to the west
Staffordshire	Fulford	54.2	87.2	Beginning of controlled-access		
Staffordshire	Fulford	54.2– 54.6	87.2– 87.9	—	To A521 / A520 – Cheadle, Stone	Roundabout interchange
Staffordshire	Fulford– Forsbrook– Stoke-on-Trent boundary	54.8– 55.1	88.2– 88.7	—	A521 north – Blythe Bridge, Caverswall	Roundabout interchange
Staffordshire	Meir, Stoke-on-Trent	55.3	89.0	—	Services	Southeastbound exit and entrance
Staffordshire	Meir, Stoke-on-Trent	55.3– 55.4	89.0– 89.2	—	Whittle Road – Meir Park Industrial Estate	Northwestbound exit and entrance
Staffordshire	Meir, Stoke-on-Trent	55.4– 56.0	89.2– 90.1	—	A520 – Leek, Stone, Meir	Roundabout interchange; A50 runs below street level through the Meir Tunnel
Staffordshire	Meir, Stoke-on-Trent	56.3	90.6	—	Railway Road	Southeastbound exit and entrance
Staffordshire	Meir, Stoke-on-Trent	56.3	90.6	—	Royal Mail Depot	Northwestbound exit and entrance
Staffordshire	Longton, Stoke-on-Trent	56.4– 56.7	90.8– 91.2	—	A5007 west – Normacot, Longton (E)	Dumbbell interchange; eastern terminus of A5007
Staffordshire	Longton, Stoke-on-Trent	57.0– 57.8	91.7– 93.0	—	B5039 to A5005 / A5035 – Longton, Stone, Trentham	Split interchange configuration, with Trentham Road a hybrid dumbbell interchange handling movements to & from the southeast, and with Foley Road a roundabout interchange handling movements to & from the northwest; these interchanges are connected by frontage roads
Staffordshire	Heron Cross, Stoke-on-Trent	58.1– 58.4	93.5– 94.0	—	A50 – City centre (Hanley), Blurton, Heron Cross, Fenton	A50 exits the near-motorway at this junction; however. a spur of A50 continues on the near-motorway toward the A500; split interchange configuration, with Heron Cross and the Blurton Road Roundabout each being roundabout interchanges; these are connected by frontage roads; Heron Cross handles City centre (Hanley) and Fenton, and the Blurton Road Roundabout handles Blurton and Heron Cross
Staffordshire	Heron Cross, Stoke-on-Trent	58.4	94.0	End of controlled-access		
Staffordshire	Fenton, Stoke-on-Trent	58.7	94.5		King Street (A5007 east) – Longton	Roundabout; Longton signed northwest only; southeastern terminus of A5007 concurrency
Staffordshire	Fenton, Stoke-on-Trent	58.9	94.8		City Road (A5007 west) – Stoke	Roundabout; northwestern terminus of A5007 concurrency
Staffordshire	Hanley, Stoke-on-Trent	60.2	96.9		A52 (Leek Road) to M6 / A53 – Newcastle-under-Lyme, Ashbourne, Leek, Stoke, Bucknall, Milton	Roundabout
Staffordshire	Hanley, Stoke-on-Trent	60.7	97.7		A5008 west to M6 – Newcastle-under-Lyme	Roundabout; Newcastle signed northwest only; southeastern terminus of A5008 concurrency
Staffordshire	Hanley, Stoke-on-Trent	61.0	98.2		Bucknall New Road (A5008 east) to A52 / A53 – Ashbourne, Leek	Northwestern terminus of A5008 concurrency
Staffordshire	Hanley, Stoke-on-Trent	61.2– 61.3	98.5– 98.7	—	Town Road (B5047) – Potteries Shopping Centre	Folded diamond interchange with roundabouts
Staffordshire	Hanley, Stoke-on-Trent	61.5	99.0		Hanover Street (A5006 south) – City centre	Roundabout; city centre signed northwest only; northern terminus of A5006
Staffordshire	Hanley, Stoke-on-Trent	61.9	99.6		A53 (Cobridge Road / Elder Road) to M6 / A500 – Newcastle, Leek, Etruria, Stoke, Milton	
Staffordshire	Tunstall, Stoke-on-Trent	63.6	102.4		Williamson Street (A5271 south) – Longport, Stoke	Roundabout; destinations signed northwest only; southeastern terminus of A5271 concurrency
Staffordshire	Tunstall, Stoke-on-Trent	63.9	102.8		The Boulevard (A5271 north) to A527 – Biddulph	Information signed northwest only; northwestern terminus of A5271 concurrency
Staffordshire	Tunstall, Stoke-on-Trent	64.8	104.3		A527 (Reginald Mitchell Way / James Brindley Way) to M6 / A500 – Newcastle	Roundabout
Cheshire	Church Lawton, Cheshire East	67.4	108.5		A34 (Congleton Road) to M6 – Newcastle-under-Lyme, Birmingham, Congleton, Manchester, Stoke-on-Trent, Scholar Green	Birmingham signed northwest only, Stoke southeast only
Cheshire	Church Lawton, Cheshire East	68.7	110.6		A5011 south (Linley Road) / B5077 (Crewe Road) to M6 / A34 / A500 / A532 – Newcastle	Northern terminus of A5011
Cheshire	Rode Heath, Cheshire East	69.5	111.8		A533 northwest (Sandbach Road) – Sandbach, Northwich	Southeastern terminus of A533
Cheshire	Arclid, Cheshire East	73.2	117.8		A534 (Congleton Road / Spark Lane) to M6 / A34 / A5061 – Nantwich, Warrington, Congleton, Sandbach, Crewe	
Cheshire	Brereton, Cheshire East	74.5	119.9		A5022 south (Holmes Chapel Road) to M6 / A534 / A500 – Sandbach, Crewe, Nantwich, Stoke	Information signed northwest only; northern terminus of A5022
Cheshire	Holmes Chapel, Cheshire East	76.5	123.1		A54 to M6 / A5061 / A51 / A535 / A537 – Middlewich, Congleton, Warrington, Chester, Alderley Edge, Macclesfield	Only Congleton and Middlewich signed southeast
Cheshire	Holmes Chapel, Cheshire East	76.8	123.6		A535 north (Macclesfield Road) to A537 – Macclesfield	Southern terminus of A535
Cheshire	Knutsford, Cheshire East	84.8	136.5		A537 east (Adams Hill) to B5085 / B5086 – Macclesfield, Mobberley, Knutsford Town Centre, Alderley Edge, Wilmslow	Knutsford signed northwest only, To B5086, Alderley and Wilmslow southeast only; western terminus of A537
Cheshire	Knutsford, Cheshire East	85.1	137.0		A5033 west (Northwich Road) to M6 / A51 / A559 – Chester, Northwich	Roundabout; To A559 and Northwich signed northwest only; eastern terminus of A5033
Cheshire	Mere, Cheshire East	86.8	139.7		Mereside Road (A5034 north) – Bucklow Hill, Ashley	Destinations signed northwest only; southern terminus of A5034
Cheshire	Mere, Cheshire East	88.0– 88.1	141.6– 141.8		A556 north to M56 – Manchester, Altrincham	Roundabout combined with a single cloverleaf slip road; access only to dual-carriageway A556 north; Altrincham signed northwest only
Cheshire	Lymm– Grappenhall and Thelwall boundary, Borough of Warrington	92.2– 92.4	148.4– 148.7		M6 to M56 / M62 – Birmingham, Preston, North Wales, Chester, Manchester, Liverpool, Leeds	To M62, Liverpool and Leeds signed southeast only; M6 junction 20; A50 negotiates through this hybrid dogbone/dumbbell interchange
Cheshire	Grappenhall, Borough of Warrington	94.1	151.4		A56 (Chester Road / Stockport Road) to M56 / A533 – Stockton Heath, Lymm, Runcorn, Manchester, Chester	To M6, Runcorn and Manchester signed northwest only, Chester southeast only
Cheshire	Warrington	95.2	153.2		A5061 west – Town centre	Eastern terminus of A5061
Cheshire	Warrington	96.6	155.5		A57 (Manchester Road) to M6 – Town centre, Manchester, Irlam	Manchester signed northwest only, Irlam southeast only
Cheshire	Warrington	97.1	156.3		A574 north (Birchwood Way) to M62 – Leigh, Manchester, Padgate, Birchwood	Southeastern terminus of A574 concurrency
Cheshire	Warrington	98.2	158.0		A49 (Winwick Road (A574 south)) to Hawley's Lane / M62 / M6 – Town centre, Wigan, Winwick, Dallam	Northwestern terminus; northwestern terminus of A574 concurrency
A50 Spur
Staffordshire	Heron Cross, Stoke-on-Trent	0.0	0.0	Resume controlled-access		
Staffordshire	Heron Cross, Stoke-on-Trent	0.0– 0.5	0.0– 0.80	—	To M6 / A34 – Stone, Newcastle-under-Lyme	Heron Cross Interchange; A50 Spur continues; see description above at miles 58.1–58.4
Staffordshire	Trentham Lakes, Stoke-on-Trent	0.5– 1.0	0.80– 1.6	—	B5490 – bet365 Stadium, Trentham Lakes Industrial Estate	Trentham Lakes North Junction; westbound exit and entrance; eastbound exit leads to two-way connector road, both connect to eastbound frontage road with slip road to eastbound A50 Spur, frontage also connects to Blurton Road Roundabout at the previous junction
Staffordshire	Sideway, Stoke-on-Trent	1.2	1.9	—	A500 to M6 / A34 / A5006 – Nantwich, Stone, Newcastle-under-Lyme, City centre (Hanley), Stoke, Campbell Road	Sideway Interchange; split interchange configuration, with A50 Spur/Sideway a roundabout interchange and the A5006 junction a trumpet interchange; A5006 handles itself & Campbell Road; A50 Spur/Sideway handles all other movements via the A500; southbound A500 must use the A50 Spur's roundabout to reach A5006, likewise traffic from the A5006 must use the A50 Spur's roundabout to access northbound A500; western terminus of A50 Spur
1.000 mi = 1.609 km; 1.000 km = 0.621 mi: Concurrency terminus; Incomplete access

== Incidents ==
- In 2008, two mentally ill Swedish sisters, Ursula and Sabina Eriksson, caused mayhem on the nearby M6, and one of them jumped from an overpass on the A50.
- On 15 April 2018, a police pursuit on the road ended in a collision between two cars near Longton, Stoke-on-Trent. A man was killed and three others were injured, one critically. Staffordshire Police's Collision Investigation Unit and the Independent Office for Police Conduct are both investigating.
