= M64 =

M64 or M-64 may refer to:

- Ou Kaapse Weg (M64), a mountain road in the Southern Peninsula of Cape Town, South Africa
- Messier 64, a spiral galaxy known as the Black Eye Galaxy
- M64, an FPGA-based home console that plays Nintendo 64 cartridges.
- M64 motorway, a motorway planned, but never built, in England
- M-64 (Michigan highway), a north–south highway in the Upper Peninsula of the US state of Michigan.
