= A527 road =

Road in England

A527

Route information
- Length: 13 mi (21 km)

Major junctions
- South end: Newcastle-under-Lyme
- A34; A52; A53 A500 A523; A50; A54
- North end: Congleton

Location
- Country: United Kingdom
- Primary destinations: Wolstanton; Longport; Tunstall; Biddulph

Road network
- Roads in the United Kingdom; Motorways; A and B road zones

The A527 is a road in England that runs from the town centre of Newcastle-under-Lyme, Staffordshire to Congleton, Cheshire, by way of Wolstanton, Longport, Tunstall and Biddulph. As it passes through Tunstall it forms part of the new linkway connecting Tunstall and Chell with the A500, and takes its name from two of the areas most famous residents Reginald Mitchell Way and James Brindley Way. Along its route it crosses the A52, A53, A500 and briefly merges with the A50.
