= A515 road =

Road in England

A515

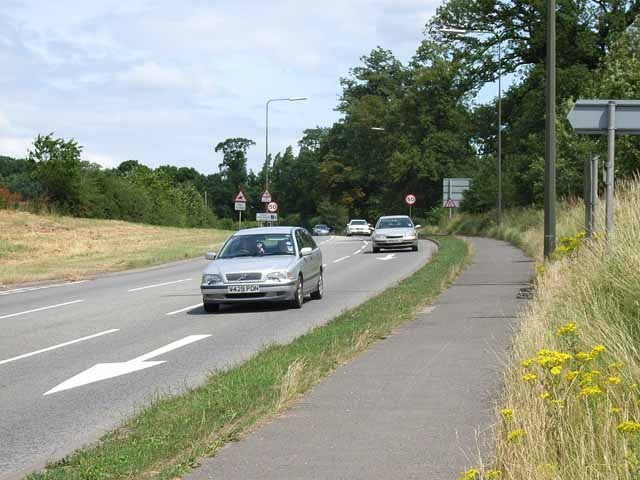
- A515 at Oaks Green

Route information
- Length: 48.0 mi (77.2 km)

Major junctions
- North end: Buxton
- A51 A513; A50; A52 A517 A5012 A5270; A53
- South end: Lichfield

Location
- Country: United Kingdom

Road network
- Roads in the United Kingdom; Motorways; A and B road zones
← A514	→ A516

The A515 is a primary route in England, which runs from Lichfield in Staffordshire to Buxton in Derbyshire.

== Route ==
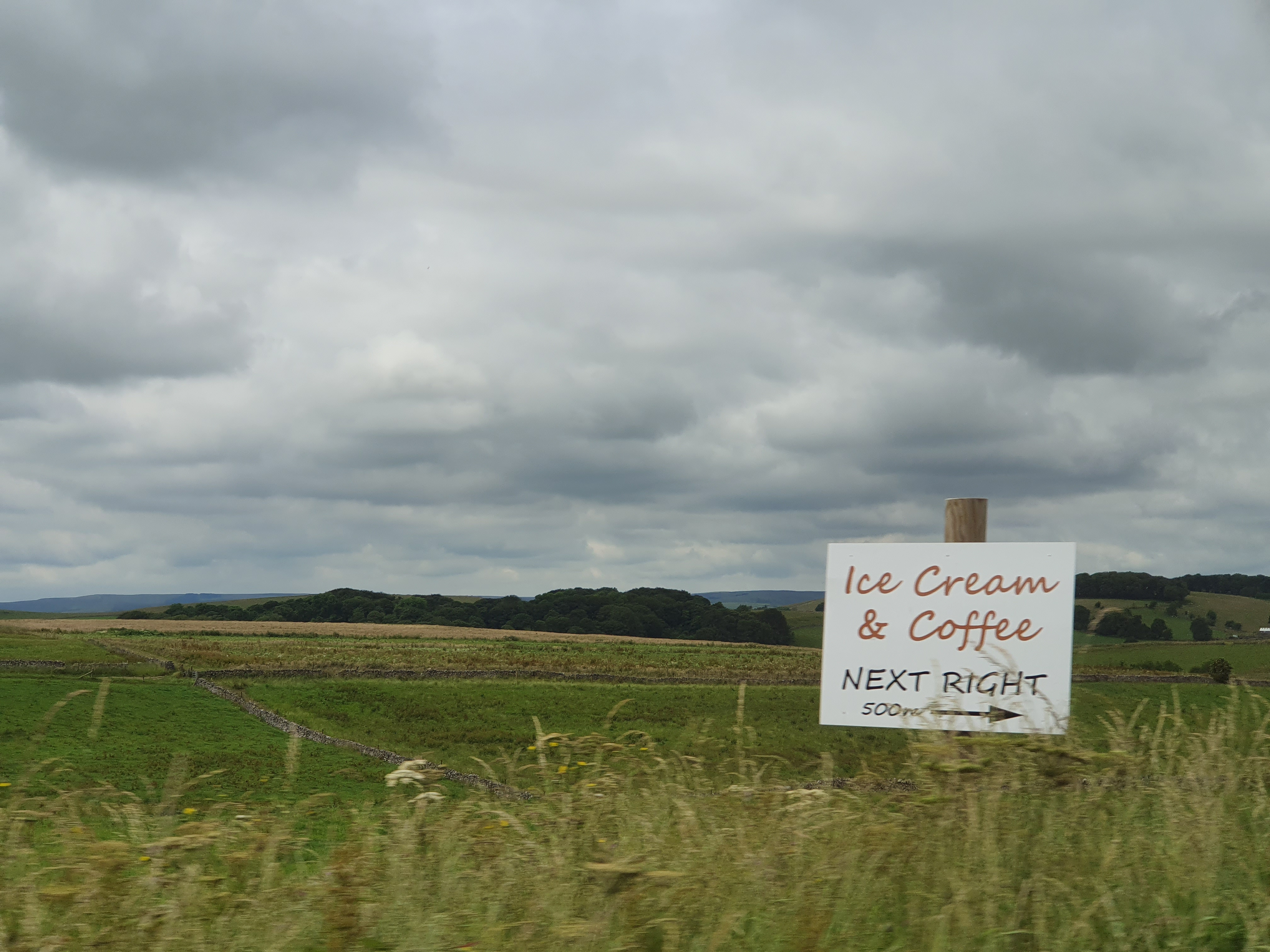
View from the A515, through the Peak District

The A515 begins off the A51 road just outside Lichfield. It crosses the Trent and Mersey Canal and passes through the villages of Kings Bromley and Yoxall. As it crosses the River Dove, the road enters Derbyshire. Near Sudbury the road briefly follows the route of the A50 road, before heading northwards again. The road goes through Ashbourne, and shortly afterwards enters the Peak District National Park. It passes through several villages including Fenny Bentley and Newhaven The road terminates in Buxton at its roundabout with the A53 road.

== Future ==
=== Ashbourne Bypass ===
In 2020, there a consultation occurred proposing routes for a north–south bypass of the town. The western routes proposed provide a direct bypass, while the eastern routes travel around the town.
