= A53 road =

Primary route in northern England

A53

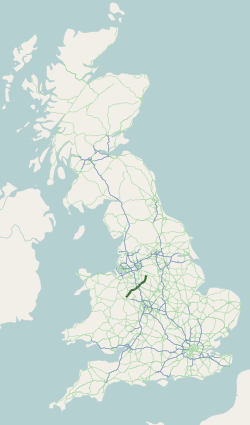

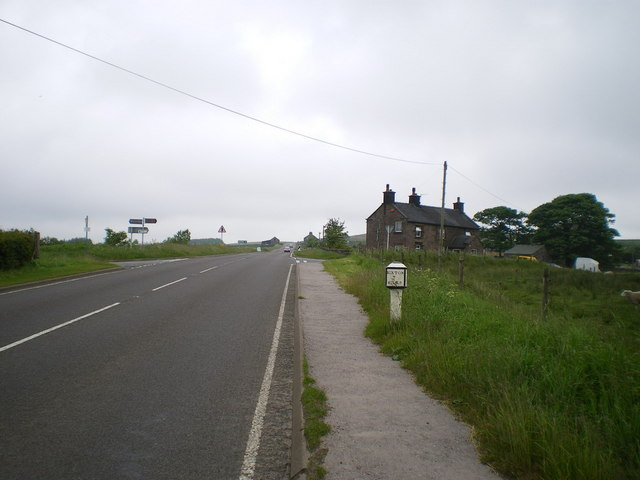

Route information
- Length: 55.1 mi (88.7 km)
- History: 1920s (Constructed)

Major junctions
- North end: A6 at Buxton; 53.259216°N 1.906576°W
- A54 in Buxton A500 in Newcastle-under-Lyme; A34 in Newcastle-under-Lyme; A51 near Baldwin's Gate A41 at Ternhill

- South end: A49 / A5112 / A5124 in Shrewsbury; 52.746671°N 2.717386°W

Location
- Country: United Kingdom
- Counties: Derbyshire; Staffordshire; Shropshire
- Primary destinations: Leek; Stoke-on-Trent; Newcastle-under-Lyme

Road network
- Roads in the United Kingdom; Motorways; A and B road zones
← A52	→ A54

The A53 is a primary route in the English Midlands, that runs from Buxton in Derbyshire to Shrewsbury in Shropshire.

== Route of Road ==
The A53 begins in the centre of Buxton off the A6 road, before meeting the A515 road at a roundabout. Out of the town, it has a junction with the A54 road (to Congleton) before continuing in a south-westerly direction. It crosses the border into the county of Staffordshire, and after leaving the Peak District travels through the town of Leek. It meets the A523 road (to Macclesfield) and the A520 road (to Stone). It crosses the Caldon Canal and travels through the Stoke-on-Trent conurbation, including Hanley and Newcastle-under-Lyme, where it meets a number of major routes such as the A50 road (to Derby), the A500 "D-Road," the Winchester-Salford A34 and the A525 road (to Whitchurch). It crosses the M6 motorway and goes through the village of Ashley. It crosses the border into Shropshire, and bypasses the town of Market Drayton, and passes the Müller factory. It meets the A41 road (to Wolverhampton) at a roundabout, then meets the A442 road (to Telford). It goes through the village of Shawbury, before it terminates at its junction with the A49 road, 3 miles (4.8 km) north-east of Shrewsbury town centre at Battlefield. The 1.9 km section to the south-west of Shawbury was bypassed in the 1950s - the original A53 road runs adjacent to Shawbury Heath and is now an unclassified country lane.

The road is single carriageway apart from a 1-mile (1.6 km) section of dual carriageway between the A500 and Stoke-on-Trent City Centre (Hanley).

== Road safety ==
The A53 has been reported as a high risk road for several years. According to a report done by the Road Safety Foundation for the European Road Assessment Programme (EuroRAP), the A53 is one of the most dangerous roads in the UK.

In June 2008, a 12-mile (19 km) stretch of the A53 between Leek and Buxton was named as the most dangerous road in the West Midlands. This single carriageway stretch had fourteen fatal and serious injury collisions between 2003 and 2005, and was rated as red—the second highest risk band—in the EuroRAP report publish by the Road Safety Foundation. The challenging character of this section of road makes it attractive to motorcyclists.

== Junction list ==
County	Location	mi	km	Destinations	Notes
Derbyshire	Buxton	0.0	0.0	A6 (Fairfield Road / Bakewell Road) to A515 / A619 – Stockport, Manchester, Dove Holes, Chapel-en-le-Frith, Matlock, Derby, Bakewell, Ashbourne, Chesterfield	Northern terminus
Derbyshire	Buxton	0.4	0.64	A515 south (Terrace Road) – Ashbourne	Northern terminus of A515
Derbyshire	Buxton	0.5	0.80	A5004 north (Manchester Road) – Whaley Bridge	Southern terminus of A5004
Derbyshire	Buxton	2.0	3.2	A54 west (Macclesfield Main Road) to A537 – Congleton, Macclesfield	Eastern terminus of A54
Staffordshire	Leek	12.3	19.8	A523 south – Ashbourne, Derby	Northern terminus of A523 concurrency
Staffordshire	Leek	12.7	20.4	A523 north (Church Street) – Macclesfield	Southern terminus of A523 concurrency
Staffordshire	Leek	13.0	20.9	A520 south (Compton) – Stone	Information signed northbound only; northern terminus of A520
Staffordshire	Baddeley Green	19.1	30.7	Baddeley Green Lane (A5009 south) – Milton, Stoke-on-Trent, Stoke	Information signed northbound only; northern terminus of A5009
Staffordshire	Smallthorne– Sneyd Green boundary	21.0– 21.1	33.8– 34.0	A5272 – Hanley	
Staffordshire	Cobridge	22.0	35.4	A50 (Waterloo Road) to A52 / A527 – City centre, Ashbourne, Warrington, Kidsgrove, Congleton, Fenton, Longton, Burslem, Tunstall	Kidsgrove, Fenton, Longton, Burslem and Tunstall signed southbound only, Warrington northbound only
Staffordshire	Etruria	22.5– 22.8	36.2– 36.7	A5010 east – City centre	Junction; western terminus of A5010
Staffordshire	Newcastle-under-Lyme	23.3	37.5	A500 to M6 / A50 / A34 – Uttoxeter, Nantwich, Congleton	To A34, Nantwich and Congleton signed northbound only; junction on A500
Staffordshire	Newcastle-under-Lyme	24.2	38.9	A52 east – Stoke, Ashbourne	Ashbourne signed southbound only; northern termminus of A52 concurrency
Staffordshire	Newcastle-under-Lyme	24.4	39.3	Ryecroft (A52 west) / A527 north (Queen Street) / A34 / A500 – Nantwich, Congleton, Tunstall, Biddulph	To A34 and Congleton signed southbound only, To A500, Tunstall and Biddulph northbound only; southern terminus of A52 concurrency; southern terminus of A527
Staffordshire	Newcastle-under-Lyme	24.7	39.8	A34 south (London Road) / A519 south (Brook Lane) to M6 – Stone, Eccleshall	A519 and Eccleshall signed southbound only; northern terminus of A34 concurrency; northern terminus of A519
Staffordshire	Newcastle-under-Lyme	24.8	39.9	A34 north (Lower Street) to M6 north / A500 – Congleton, Nantwich	Southern terminus of A34 concurrency
Staffordshire	Whitmore	27.8	44.7	A5182 east (Trentham Road) to M6 – Stoke-on-Trent, Trentham	Western terminus of A5182
Staffordshire	Maer	31.6	50.9	A51 southeast to M6 south / A34 – Stone, Stafford	Northern terminus of A51 concurrency
Staffordshire	Maer	31.8	51.2	A51 northwest – Nantwich, Woore	Southern terminus of A51 concurrency
Shropshire	Market Drayton– Adderley boundary	38.9	62.6	A529 (Adderley Road) – Market Drayton, Audlem	
Shropshire	Ternhill	41.9	67.4	A41 – Wolverhampton, Newport, Whitchurch	
Shropshire	Hodnet	45.2	72.7	A442 south / Shrewsbury Street – Telford, Hodnet	Northern terminus of A442
Shropshire	Shrewsbury	55.1	88.7	A49 south (Shrewsbury Road) / A5112 west (Battlefield Road) to A5124 / A5 / M54 / A458 / A528 – Leominster, Telford, Bridgnorth, Welshpool, Whitchurch, Shrewsbury, Ellesmere	Southern terminus; northern terminus of A5112; eastern terminus of A5124
1.000 mi = 1.609 km; 1.000 km = 0.621 mi: Concurrency terminus
