= A51 road =

Road in England

A51

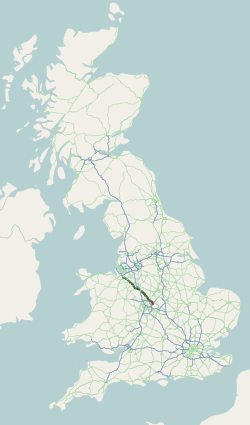

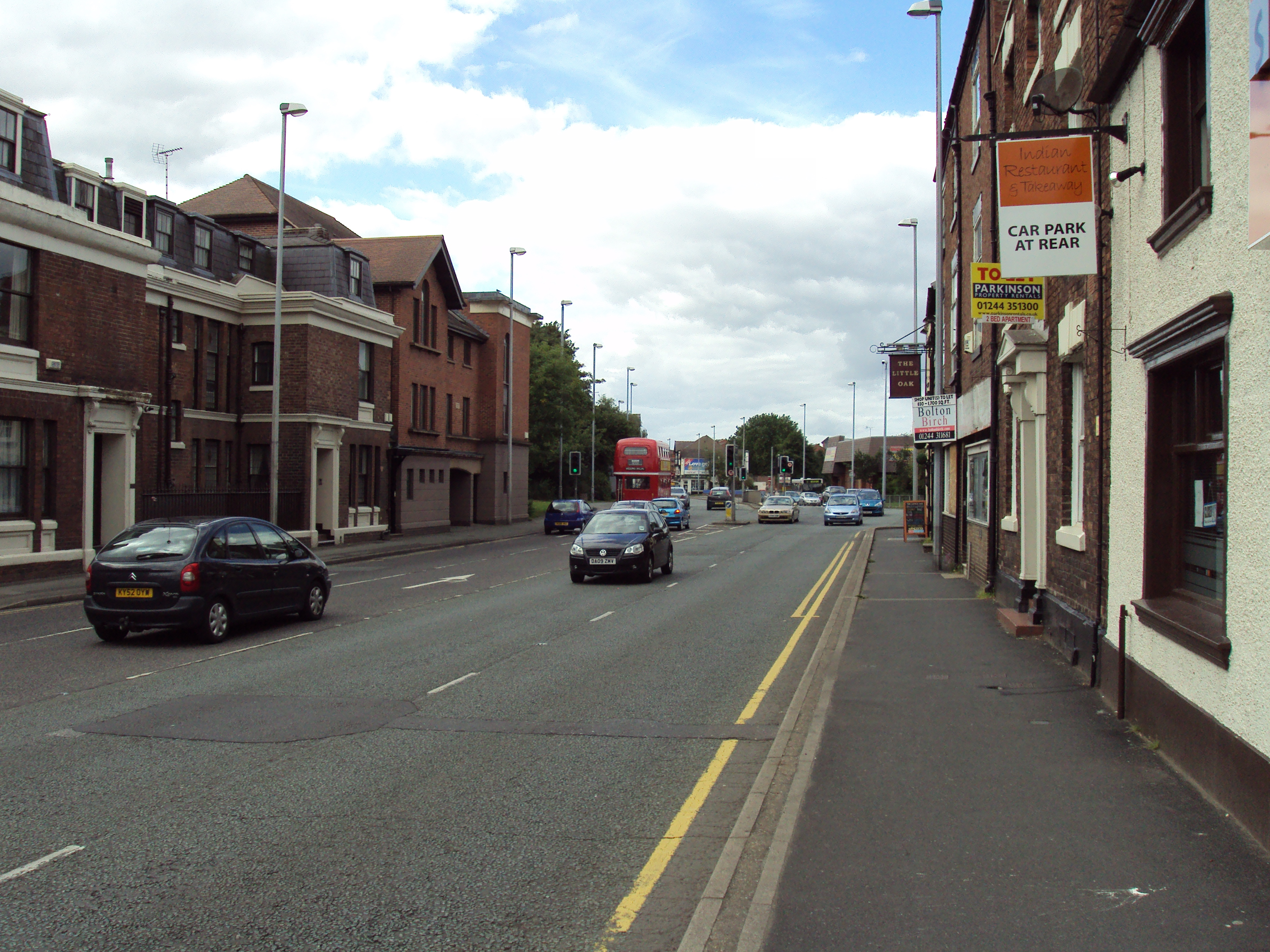
- The A51 in Boughton looking towards Chester

Route information
- Maintained by Cheshire East Council; Cheshire West and Chester Council; Shropshire Council; Staffordshire County Council; Warwickshire County Council
- Length: 79.0 mi (127.1 km)
- Existed: 1922–present

Major junctions
- Northwest end: Chester; 52.5586°N 1.6808°W
- A5115 / A5268, Chester A41 / A55, Vicars Cross; A54, Tarvin; A49, Tarporley A500 / A530 / A534, Nantwich A525, Woore; A53, near Baldwin's Gate A519, Swynnerton; A34, Stone A518, Weston A460 / A513, Rugeley A461 / A515 / A5127 / A5192 / A5206, Lichfield A5 / A453 / A513 / A4091, Tamworth A4097, Kingsbury
- Southeast end: Kingsbury; 53.1921°N 2.8821°W

Location
- Country: United Kingdom
- Counties: Cheshire, Shropshire, Staffordshire, Warwickshire
- Primary destinations: Chester; Nantwich; Stone; Rugeley; Lichfield; Tamworth

Road network
- Roads in the United Kingdom; Motorways; A and B road zones
← A50	→ A52

The A51 is a road in England which runs for 85 miles (137 km) from Chester, Cheshire to Kingsbury, North Warwickshire.

== Route ==
It takes on the following route:

- Chester
- Vicars Cross
- Littleton
- Tarvin (bypass opened 1984)
- Duddon
- Clotton
- Tarporley (merges briefly with A49)
- Nantwich
- Woore
- Stone (merges briefly with A34)
- Sandon
- Weston
- Great Haywood
- Little Haywood
- Colwich
- Wolseley Bridge
- Rugeley (bypass opened 2007
- Longdon
- Lichfield
- Tamworth
- Kingsbury

== History ==
Originally the A51 terminated at Two Gates where it met the A5, the road south continuing as the A423. When the A423 was removed north of Coventry, the A51 was extended to meet the A47 (now B4114). It was cut back to Kingsbury when the A47 was downgraded.

== Junction list ==
County	Location	mi	km	Destinations	Notes
Warwickshire	Kingsbury	0.0	0.0	A4097 west (Kingsbury Road) / B4098 (Coventry Road) / Piccadilly Lane – Birmingham, Coventry, Wood End, Piccadilly, Hurley, Nether Whitacre, Whitacre Heath	Southeastern terminus
Staffordshire	Tamworth	5.3– 5.4	8.5– 8.7	Saxon Drive (A453 northeast) – City centre, Amington, Glascote	Amington and Glascoe signed northwest only; southeastern terminus of A453 concurrency
Staffordshire	Tamworth	5.7	9.2	A4091 south – Fazeley	Northern terminus of A4091
Staffordshire	Tamworth	6.0	9.7	A453 southwest (Bonehill Road) – Sutton Coldfield A5 / M42 / M6 Toll – Nuneaton, Brownhills, Nottingham, Birmingham, Fazeley	Fazeley signed northwest only; northeastern terminus of A453 concurrency
Staffordshire	Lichfield	12.5	20.1	A5206 south to M6 Toll / A38 / A5148 – Birmingham, Burton, Tamworth, Sutton Coldfield	Sutton signed southeast only; northern terminus of A5206
Staffordshire	Lichfield	12.9	20.8	A5127 south (Birmingham Road) – Shenstone, Wall	A5127 and Shenstone signed northwest only; northern terminus of A5127
Staffordshire	Lichfield	13.5	21.7	A461 southwest (Limburg Avenue) to A5 / A5190 – Walsall, Brownhills, Burntwood	Northeastern terminus of A461
Staffordshire	Lichfield	15.5	24.9	Eastern Avenue (A5192 east) to M6 / A5 / A38 – Tamworth, Burton, Birmingham	Western terminus of A5192
Staffordshire	Lichfield– Farewell and Chorley– Curborough and Elmhurst boundary	16.0	25.7	A515 north (Featherbed Lane) – Ashbourne	Southern terminus of A515
Staffordshire	Brereton	20.2	32.5	A460 southwest (Main Road) – Town centre, Cannock, Brereton	
Staffordshire	Brereton	20.6	33.2	A513 southeast (Rugeley Road) / Armitage Road – Armitage, Kings Bromley, Rugeley	Southeastern terminus of A513 concurrency
Staffordshire	Colwich	23.5	37.8	A460 southwest (Wolseley Road) – Rugeley, Cannock	Northeastern terminus of A460
Staffordshire	Colwich	24.4	39.3	A513 northwest – Stafford, Milford	Milford signed northwest only; northwestern terminus of A513 concurrency
Staffordshire	Weston	29.7	47.8	A518 west (Stafford Road) – Stafford, Weston	Weston signed northwest only; southeastern terminus of A518 concurrency
Staffordshire	Weston	29.9	48.1	A518 east – Uttoxeter	Northwestern terminus of A518 concurrency
Staffordshire	Stone	35.3	56.8	A34 / Brooms Road to M6 – Stafford	Southeastern terminus of A34 concurrency
Staffordshire	Stone	36.2	58.3	A520 north / B5026 – Stone, Eccleshall	Southern terminus of A520
Staffordshire	Meaford	38.0	61.2	A34 north to M6 – Stoke-on-Trent, Newcastle-under-Lyme	Northwestern terminus of A34 concurrency
Staffordshire	Swynnerton	40.8	65.7	A519 to M6 north – Eccleshall, Newcastle-under-Lyme	
Staffordshire	Maer	46.1	74.2	A53 north to M6 north – Newcastle, Stoke	To M6 signed southeast only; southeastern terminus of A53 concurrency
Staffordshire	Maer	46.2	74.4	A53 south (Newcastle Road) – Shrewsbury, Market Drayton, Loggerheads	Market Drayton and Loggerheads signed northwest only; northwestern terminus of A53 concurrency
Shropshire	Woore	49.7	80.0	A525 south (Newcastle Road) – Newcastle-under-Lyme	Southeastern terminus of A525 concurrency
Shropshire	Woore	49.8	80.1	A525 north (Audlem Road) – Whitchurch, Audlem	Northwestern terminus of A525 concurrency
Cheshire	Stapeley	57.4	92.4	A530 south (Peter de Stapleigh Way) / London Road to A529 – Whitchurch, Audlem, Nantwich town centre	Southeastern terminus of A530 concurrency
Cheshire	Stapeley	58.0	93.3	A500 east / Newcastle Road / Cheerbrook Road to M6 / A5020 – Stoke-on-Trent, Crewe, Congleton, Shavington, Wybunbury, Willaston	Shavington, Wybunbury and Willaston signed southeast only; western terminus of A500
Cheshire	Willaston	58.6	94.3	A534 east / Crewe Road (B338) / Park Road – Wistaston, Willaston, Nantwich town centre	A534, Wistaston and Willaston signed southeast only, Nantwich northwest only; southeastern terminus of A534 concurrency
Cheshire	Nantwich	59.5	95.8	A530 north / Middlewich Road to A532 – Middlewich, Crewe	Northeastern terminus of A530 concurrency
Cheshire	Hurleston– Acton boundary	61.5	99.0	A534 west / Chester Road (B5341) – Wrexham	Information signed northwest only; northestern terminus of A534 concurrency
Cheshire	Tiverton and Tilstone Fearnall	68.2	109.8	A49 south / Eaton Lane – Whitchurch, Eaton, Beeston, Bunbury	Southeastern terminus of A49 concurrency
Cheshire	Tarporley	69.6	112.0	A49 / Rode Street to M56 / M6 – Warrington, Preston, Tarporley, Utkinton	To M56, M6 and Preston signed northwest only, Tarporley and Utkinton southeast only; northwestern terminus of A49 concurrency
Cheshire	Tarvin	74.5	119.9	A54 east (Holme Street) to M56 / M6 – Manchester, Preston, Tarvin, Winsford, Northwich	Tarvin, Winsford and Northwich signed southeast only; western terminus of A54
Cheshire	Littleton– Guilden Sutton boundary	77.3	124.4	A55 to M53 / M56 / M6 / A483 – North Wales, Wrexham, Ellesmere Port, Manchester	To M56, M6 and Manchester signed southeast only; junction on A55
Cheshire	Littleton– Guilden Sutton– Great Boughton boundary	77.5	124.7	A41 – Whitchurch, Upton	
Cheshire	Chester	78.4	126.2	A5115 east (Christleton Road) to A41 – Whitchurch	Western terminus of A5115
Cheshire	Chester	79.0	127.1	Grovesnor Park Road / St Oswalds Way (A5268) / City Road – North Wales	Northwestern terminus
1.000 mi = 1.609 km; 1.000 km = 0.621 mi: Concurrency terminus
