= Sideway =

Coordinates: 52.988°N 2.185°W

- Location within Staffordshire
- OS grid reference: SJ877434
- Unitary authority: Stoke-on-Trent
- Ceremonial county: Staffordshire
- Region: West Midlands
- Country: England
- Sovereign state: United Kingdom
- Post town: STOKE-ON-TRENT
- Postcode district: ST4
- Dialling code: 01782
- Police: Staffordshire
- Fire: Staffordshire
- Ambulance: West Midlands
- UK Parliament: Stoke-on-Trent Central

Sideway (/ˈsɪdəweɪ/ SID-ə-way) is an area of Stoke-on-Trent, approximately one mile south west of Stoke-upon-Trent, Stoke-on-Trent, in Staffordshire, England. It is located on the junction of the A500 and the A50 adjacent to the Bet365 Stadium.

The area around the stadium was formerly a spoil tip for the Hem Heath Colliery, which closed in the mid-1990s; the stadium itself opened in 1997. The surrounding area has also been redeveloped and is home to a hotel, restaurant, health club and a number of car dealerships.

Sideway is also home to a Michelin factory, a medium wave transmitter for Absolute Radio, Greatest Hits Radio Staffordshire & Cheshire and BBC Radio Stoke, and the base of Marcroft Engineering, a railway wagon repair company.

It also has two lakes which are controlled by Fenton and District Angling Society. Known as the Overflow complex.

There are proposals to build a park and ride station in this area, taking advantage of its location on the A500 and A50.
