= A500 road =

Road in England

A500

- Map of the route of the A500

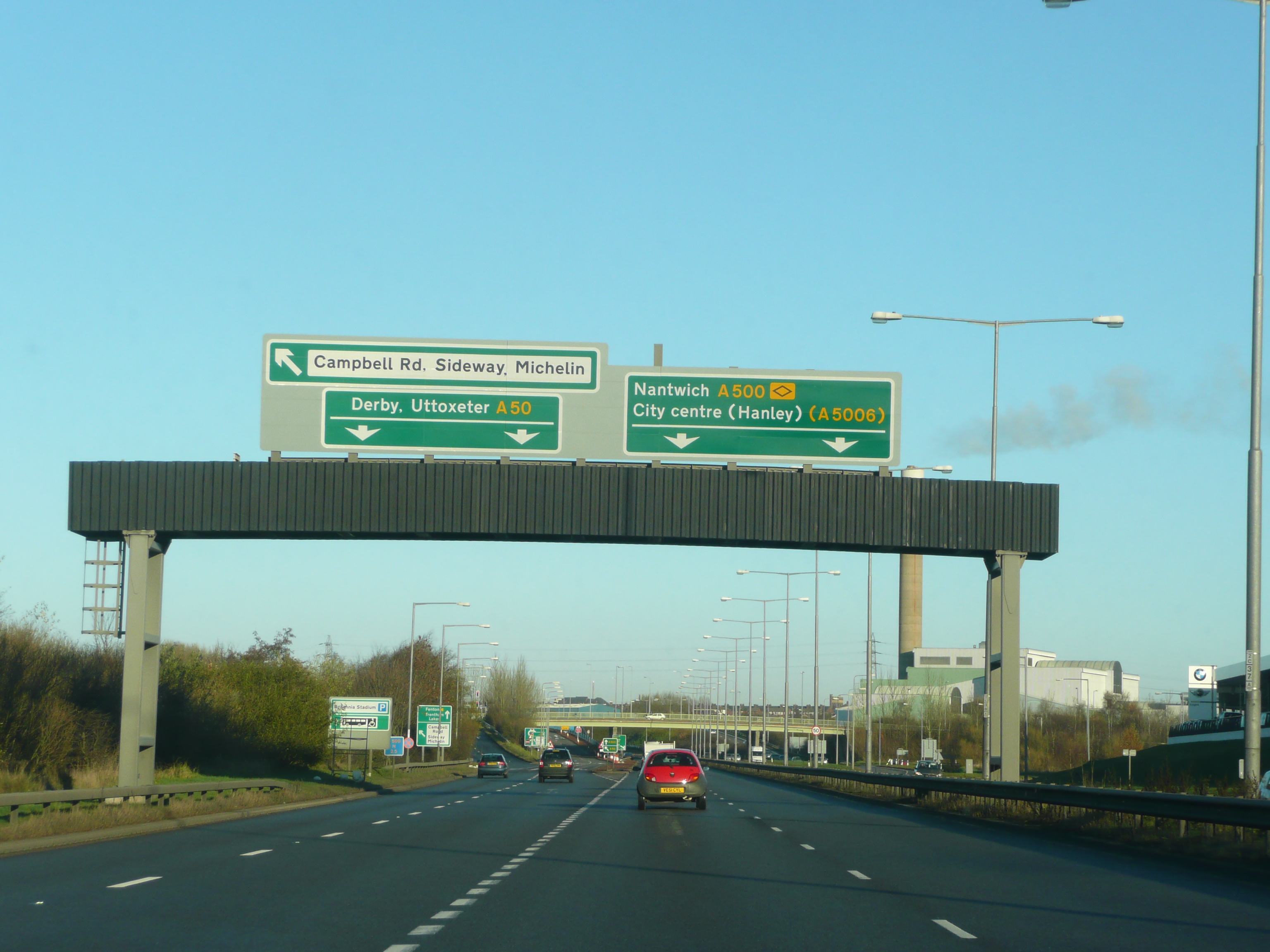
- The northbound junction between the A500 and A50

Route information
- History: Constructed began 1962 and finished 2006

Major junctions
- From: Nantwich
- M6; A34; A50; A51; A52; A53 A519 A527 A531 A5020 A5271
- To: Clayton

Location
- Country: United Kingdom
- Primary destinations: Stoke-on-Trent, Crewe

Road network
- Roads in the United Kingdom; Motorways; A and B road zones
← A499	→ A501

The A500 is a major primary A road in Staffordshire and Cheshire, England. It is dual carriageway for most of its length and connects Nantwich, junctions 16 and 15 of the M6 motorway with the city of Stoke-on-Trent. It is 19 miles (31 km) long.

The road was built to provide links between Stoke-on-Trent and the M6, before being extended to Nantwich. Construction has taken place over several stages, beginning in 1962, with the final section of the original route being completed similar to the original plans in 2006. As a trunk road, the section between junction 15 and 16 of the M6 is maintained by the Highways Agency whilst the section past junction 16 is maintained by Cheshire East council. In 2004, the road was stated as carrying 60,000 vehicles a day through Stoke.

It is known locally as the "D-Road" or "Potteries D-Road", after its configuration. The originally planned route of the road joins junctions 15 and 16 of the M6 in a 'D' shape, and was represented in the logo used by the Corporation of Stoke when promoting the road. D is also the Roman numeral representing the number 500, the number assigned to the completed road.

== History ==
By the 1960s, traffic congestion was a major problem in Stoke-on-Trent, and journeys across the area sometimes took hours. There was no connection from the newly constructed M6 to the city. Businesses in the area wanted an easier route to get their goods out of the area.

As early as 1961 the route of the road scheme – already known as the "Potteries D Road" – was included in the Staffordshire Development Plan for planning purposes.

Cover of the information leaflet about the proposed building of the "D road" through Stoke-on-Trent, showing the use of the 'D' shape overlaid on the map for promotion.

The A500 was initially built from the M6 at junction 16 to the A34 road at Talke as part of the motorway construction, opening in 1962. At the southern end, a dual carriageway was constructed from junction 15 of the M6 to the A34 near Trentham, given the number A5006, and opened at the same time. The northern section of the road was then subsequently extended from Talke to the A53 road.

The Talke to Porthill section opened on 14 March 1973.

The final section from the A34 in the south to the A53 junction was built between 1974 and 1977. The two middle junctions were to be grade separated, but due to financial constraints they were built as roundabouts. Construction involved the destruction of streets and businesses within Stoke's town centre, as well as the excavation of a mass grave of the victims of a 17th-century cholera epidemic. This final section was named Queensway, and on its completion the whole route became the A500.

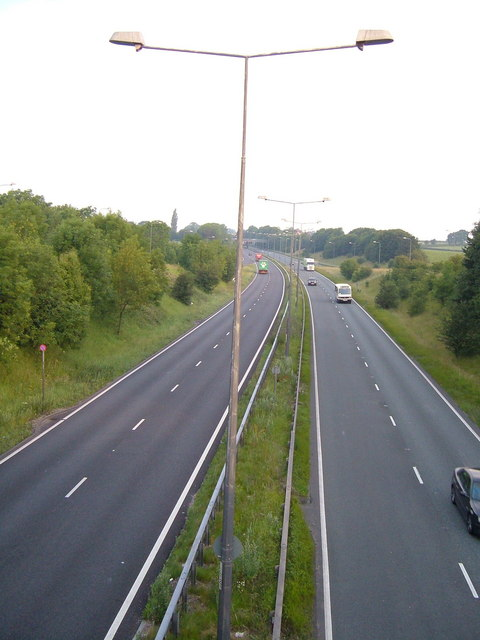
Part of the original A500 near Audley

The last section opened on 2 November 1977, by the Transport Secretary Bill Rodgers.

The route remained unchanged until the 1980s when the Hanford Roundabout junction had a flyover built, as this was a major bottleneck for both the A500 and A34. The 1977 section east of this junction had been built with provision for the bridge, but the section built as the A5006 required realignment for the new interchange. In the late 1980s the road was extended from Junction 16 close to Weston with connections provided to existing roads to Keele and Crewe. The A52, which at that time ran to Nantwich, was renumbered from Newcastle to Weston as a B road and the section from Weston to Nantwich was incorporated into the A500. In 1989 a bypass to the east of Nantwich was opened, extending the A500 from the south of Nantwich to its current northerly terminus with the A51.

In 1993 a proposal was made to add the missing flyover and underpass close to Stoke-on-Trent railway station, after an alternative plan had been rejected because of its cost. A full review of the national roads programme resulted in the suspension of that scheme however. In 1997 the A50 was rerouted through Stoke-on-Trent to meet the A500 at Sideway, where a new grade separated roundabout was constructed.

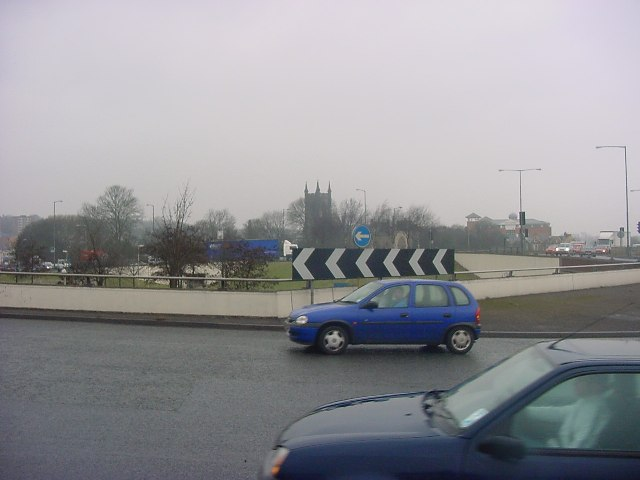
The city road junction as originally built

On the approach to Hough was a narrow single lane bridge which was added to with a Bailey bridge in 1993. In September 2003, the Shavington bypass opened to reroute the road away from three villages on the former A52 section. This was built to dual carriageway standards with provision for further junctions to new development sites.

Traffic continued to rise to the point where major congestion was experienced on the central section. Work began on 16 February 2004 on the A500 Pathfinder Project to replace the final two roundabouts in Stoke with underpasses. The Highways Agency defined the pathfinder project as involving "a new form of contract and co-operative working methods to deliver a better value project, faster." The project involved alterations to the path of the Trent and Mersey Canal and River Trent, along with new provisions for pedestrians. The work was carried out by Edmund Nuttall Limited and was planned to be completed in spring 2006. Following a number of delays for which it was rumoured the construction company was being fined up to £100,000 a day for not keeping to schedule, the road opened on Tuesday 26 September 2006, with the southbound traffic in the morning and northbound traffic in the afternoon. Several months of additional work was needed to finalise traffic light operations, gardens, and other miscellaneous tasks.

In February 2009, it was announced that the single carriageway Nantwich bypass would be re-numbered as the A51 in a bid to relieve the town centre of traffic.

In 2015, the final 500m of the eastbound single carriageway between Weston and Junction 16 of the M6 was upgraded. This included resignalling works on the roundabout in order to relieve congestion at the roundabout.

== Route ==
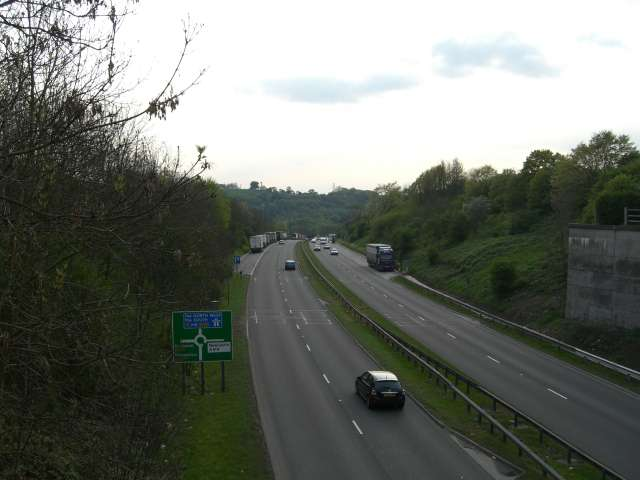
Looking towards the M6 at junction 15 on the original A5006 section

The road is the primary access route for traffic to and from almost all areas of Stoke-on-Trent. Starting to the east of Nantwich on the Nantwich bypass the dual carriageway Shavington bypass running north of Hough and Shavington. Returning to the 1980s single carriageway extension route it continues east through a cutting to the M6 at Junction 16 where it becomes a dual carriageway. Continuing through open countryside it passes under the A34 at Talke Pits, turns south before meeting the Tunstall Western Bypass and enters the north of Stoke-on-Trent. Now continuing in an urban setting it runs between Newcastle and Burslem, passing through the middle of the former Wolstanton Colliery before running east of Stoke's town centre. Passing through the newest section in a cutting it emerges south of Stoke alongside the site of the Victoria Ground. Turning west it passes the Bet365 Stadium before leaving the urban area at Hanford, south of Trent Vale. It then runs through a cutting before meeting the M6 at junction 15.

== Junctions ==
A500 junctions
Northbound (Note: The route runs in a semi-circular direction in Stoke-on-Trent. The table has the northern terminus at the top.) exits	Junction	Southbound exits	Coordinates
Nantwich, Stone A51	Cheerbrook; Roundabout	Start of road	53.061379°N 2.488307°W
Crewe, Shavington B5071		Crewe, Shavington B5071	53.070966°N 2.438407°W
Crewe Employment Park A5020		Crewe Employment Park A5020	53.071211°N 2.409407°W
Start of dual carriageway		Crewe, Weston A5020; Keele A531; End of dual carriageway	53.068026°N 2.382885°W
The North West, Preston M6; The South, Birmingham M6; Radway Green B5078; End of dual carriageway	M6 J16	Start of dual carriageway	53.068645°N 2.333651°W
Audley, Alsager		Audley, Alsager	53.067446°N 2.303009°W
Newcastle-under-Lyme; Talke, Congleton A34		Newcastle-under-Lyme; Talke, Kidsgrove, Congleton A34	53.062882°N 2.251854°W
Kidsgrove A527 (A50)		Tunstall A527	53.054706°N 2.229023°W
Wolstanton A527; Longport, Tunstall, Burslem A5271		Wolstanton A527; Longport, Tunstall, Burslem A5271	53.040181°N 2.215505°W
Wolstanton Retail Park		Wolstanton Retail Park	53.032504°N 2.209067°W
Newcastle-under-Lyme; Hanley, Leek A53		Newcastle-under-Lyme; Hanley, Leek A53	53.019534°N 2.204368°W
Shelton B5045	Shelton New Road Junction	No exit	53.011879°N 2.196643°W
No exit	Stoke Road Junction	Hanley A5006; Stoke A52; Fenton, Longton A5007	53.008832°N 2.184970°W
Hanley A5006; Stoke A52; Fenton, Longton A5007	City Road Junction	No exit	53.002750°N 2.179542°W
No exit		Heron Cross	52.999264°N 2.179348°W
Longton, Uttoxeter, Derby A50		Uttoxeter, Derby A50; Sideway	52.990598°N 2.183254°W
Sideway		No exit	52.988841°N 2.185464°W
Stone, Trentham; Trent Vale, Newcastle-under-Lyme A34	Hanford Roundabout	Stone, Trentham; Trent Vale, Newcastle-under-Lyme A34	52.982137°N 2.199819°W
Start of road	M6 J15	The North West, Preston; The South, Birmingham M6; Eccleshall; Newcastle-Under-Lyme A519	52.975916°N 2.223197°W
1.000 mi = 1.609 km; 1.000 km = 0.621 mi: Incomplete access
