= A54 road =

Road in England

A54

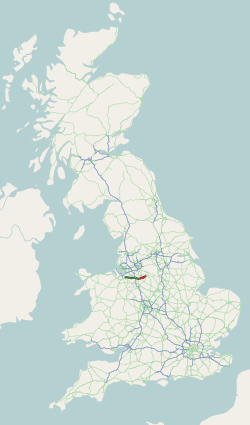

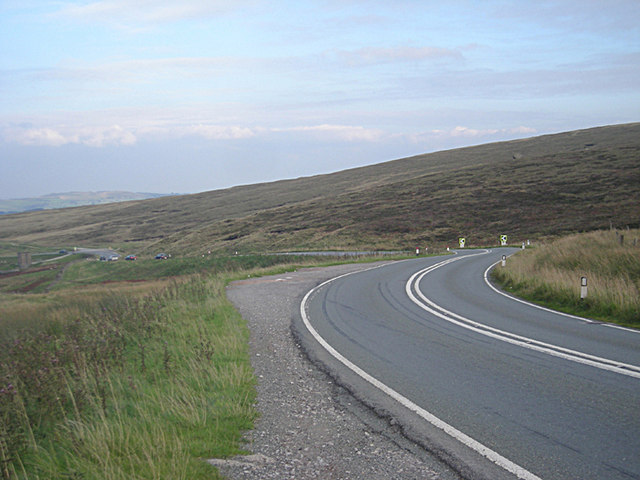
- A54 road near Buxton in Derbyshire

Route information
- Maintained by Cheshire East Council; Cheshire West and Chester Council; Derbyshire County Council
- Length: 42.0 mi (67.6 km)
- Existed: 1922–present

Major junctions
- West end: Tarvin; 53.19513°N 2.77679°W
- A51, Tarvin A556, Delamere; A49, Little Budworth A5018, Winsford A530 / A533, Middlewich; M6, Sproston; A50, Holmes Chapel A34 / A527 / A534 / A536, Congleton A523, Bosley A537, Cat and Fiddle Road; A53, Buxton
- East end: Buxton; 53.24555°N 1.94012°W

Location
- Country: United Kingdom
- Counties: Cheshire; Derbyshire
- Primary destinations: Congleton; Buxton

Road network
- Roads in the United Kingdom; Motorways; A and B road zones
← A53	→ A55

The A54 road is a road in England linking Tarvin in Cheshire with Buxton in Derbyshire. Its route through both urban and steep rural areas presented a challenge to Cheshire East Council in maintaining the safety of the road. Many years ago it was the main east–west route in Cheshire. The importance of the A54 through Middlewich and Winsford decreased in the 1970s and 1980s with the building of the M56 motorway and dualling of the A556 at Northwich. The section through Winsford carries approximately 30,000 vehicles per day.

== History ==
Re-routing of the A54 away from the narrow cobbled streets of Congleton town centre was first proposed in 1935. Before this, at the point where the A34 now meets the A54 an unusual 28-foot (8.5 m) lighthouse was erected in 1924 bearing the words "Dangerous hill – change to low gear", backlit at night, to reduce accidents at the sharp bend.

According to a 2007 report by the Road Safety Foundation for the European Road Assessment Programme (EuroRAP), the A54 is one of the most dangerous roads in the UK, second only to the A682 in Lancashire. Again in 2008 the road was rated as one of the highest-risk roads in Great Britain by EuroRAP, with a risk rating of Medium to High on its most dangerous stretch between Buxton and Congleton. Eighteen fatal or serious-injury accidents occurred on this 24-kilometre (15 mi) stretch of single-carriageway road between 2003 and 2005, 26% of which were accidents at junctions.

== Route ==
The road begins at a roundabout on the A51 near Tarvin, 5 miles (8.0 km) east of Chester. It continues on a single carriageway until it reaches Kelsall, where it becomes a 2-mile long dual carriageway on the Kelsall Bypass, which is dual carriageway because of the road's 13% incline into Delamere Forest. The westbound carriageway is subject to a mix of fixed and mobile speed cameras on its sharp descent into the Dee valley. It then becomes single carriageway again when the road reaches a TOTSO junction with the A556 to Manchester and Northwich. The road continues for 2 miles (3.2 km) to a junction with the A49, then continues through Little Budworth and the West Cheshire hills, with sharp bends near the Oulton Park racing circuit.

The first town is Winsford, where the road is a dual carriageway for 3 miles (4.8 km) through the town centre. This is the busiest section, with around 30,000 vehicles using it per day. Unusually, the suburbs have been bypassed while the main road runs directly along the High Street. Because of its urban environment and heavy traffic, it has a short section where it becomes a 3/4-lane dual carriageway in each direction between the Dene Drive and Collingham Way junctions. In Winsford it crosses the River Weaver via two bridges on a large roundabout. The traffic volume then reduces significantly when it meets the A5018 towards Northwich and the A533 North, which is used by vehicles going north to the M6 motorway and M56 to Manchester via the A556. It then continues on another bypass with a crawler lane going eastbound because of its 200-foot (61 m) ascent, passing Winsford railway station and Winsford Industrial Estate before picking up its original Roman route on Middlewich Road.

It then continues into Cheshire East and Middlewich, where it again passes through the town centre, on the Wheelock Street bypass. At a roundabout with Centurion Way it merges with traffic that has continued on the A556 to Northwich and the A530 King Street instead of using the route through Winsford. It then becomes much busier, carrying much of the traffic to the M6 junction 18 from central Cheshire.

After passing through Middlewich the A54 crosses over the M6 motorway at a conventional roundabout interchange, continuing through Holmes Chapel to Congleton, where it has a short overlap with the A34.

The road becomes more rural in character as it climbs through the Peak District National Park. The rural nature and high accident record of the A54 from Congleton and Buxton means the road is subject to 50 mph average speed cameras. It reaches a height of 1,690 feet (520 m), becoming the highest A-road in Cheshire and one of the highest in England, before crossing into Derbyshire at a fork with the A537 and continuing to a junction with the A53 on the edge of Buxton.

== List of settlements ==
The road passes through or immediately adjacent to many towns and villages on its length. Only those with their own Wikipedia article are included here, listed in the order they appear along the road travelling west–east.

- Tarvin
- Kelsall
- Over
- Winsford
- Wharton
- Middlewich
- Sproston
- Holmes Chapel
- Brereton
- Somerford
- Congleton
- Bosley
- Buxton

== Junction list ==
County	Location	mi	km	Destinations	Notes
Cheshire	Tarvin	0.0	0.0	A51 – North Wales, Chester, Tarporley, Nantwich	Western terminus
Cheshire	Delamere and Oakmere	4.4	7.1	A556 northeast to M6 / M56 / A559 – Manchester, Northwich	Information signed eastbound only; southeastern terminus of A556
Cheshire	Delamere and Oakmere– Little Budworth boundary	6.7	10.8	A49 / M56 / M6 / A51 – Warrington, Preston, Nantwich, Cuddington	
Cheshire	Winsford	12.2	19.6	A5018 northeast to A533 – Northwich	Southwestern terminus of A5018
Cheshire	Stanthorne with Wimboldsley	14.8	23.8	A533 northwest – Northwich	Information signed westbound only; western terminus of A533 concurrency
Cheshire	Middlewich	15.3	24.6	A530 north (Croxton Lane) – Northwich	Information signed eastbound only; western terminus of A530 concurrency
Cheshire	Middlewich	15.4	24.8	A530 south (Nantwich Road) to B5076 – Nantwich, Crewe	To B5076 and Crewe signed westbound only; eastern terminus of A530 concurrency
Cheshire	Middlewich	15.7	25.3	A533 southeast (Lewin Street) – Sandbach	Eastern terminus of A533 concurrency
Cheshire	Holmes Chapel	18.1	29.1	M6 – Warrington, Preston, Stoke-on-Trent, Birmingham	M6 junction 18
Cheshire	Holmes Chapel	19.6	31.5	A50 (London Road) – Knutsford, Kidsgrove	
Cheshire	Somerford	24.2	38.9	A536 (Wolstenholme Elmy Way) to M6 south / A34 / A534 – Macclesfield, Manchester, Nantwich, Sandbach	
Cheshire	Congleton	25.6	41.2	A34 south (Newcastle Road) / A534 west (Sandbach Road) to M6 – Newcastle, Nantwich, Sandbach	Western terminus of A34 concurrency; eastern terminus of A534
Cheshire	Congleton	26.3	42.3	A34 north (Rood Hill) to A536 – Manchester, Macclesfield	Eastern terminus of A34 concurrency
Cheshire	Congleton	26.9	43.3	A527 south (Park Lane) – Biddulph	Northern terminus of A527
Cheshire	Bosley	31.3	50.4	A523 – Macclesfield, Leek, Manchester	Manchester signed eastbound only
Derbyshire	Hartington Upper Quarter	40.3	64.9	A537 west to M6 – Macclesfield, Preston	To M6 and Preston signed westbound only; eastern terminus of A537
Derbyshire	Buxton	42.0	67.6	A53 (Leek Road) to A6 – Town centre, Matlock, Leek	Eastern terminus
1.000 mi = 1.609 km; 1.000 km = 0.621 mi: Concurrency terminus

== See also ==
- Cat and Fiddle Road
