= M64 motorway =

Unbuilt UK motorway from Stoke to Derby

Coordinates: 52.8970°N 1.7876°W

M64

Route information
- Length: 40 mi (64 km)
- Status: Cancelled
- History: Proposed cancelled in 1976.

Major junctions
- West end: Stoke on Trent
- (original alignment)
- East end: Kegworth

Location
- Country: United Kingdom
- Primary destinations: M6 motorway Stoke on Trent; Derby; Burton on Trent; Uttoxeter; Kegworth; M1 Motorway

Road network
- Roads in the United Kingdom; Motorways; A and B road zones

The United Kingdom's M64 motorway was planned during the 1970s to link the M6 at Stoke-on-Trent with the M1 near Castle Donington, by way of Uttoxeter and Derby.

== Route ==
Its purpose would have been to allow traffic travelling from the south-east to the north-west to avoid the busy M6 around Birmingham.

== History ==
It would join the M6 at Beech, part of Swynnerton.

In 1975 Checkley and Team formed the 'Action for M64' group, to support the motorway. In June 1976, BBC Radio 4 broadcast a programme, about plans for the motorway, called Time for Action, featuring residents of the villages of Tittensor and Barlaston, to the south of Stoke, and in Checkley and Tean, Staffordshire. Whilst the first two villages escaped the construction of the motorway, the last two had the A564 built nearby, although both Checkley and Upper Tean were previously on the main through-route, the single-carriageway A50. Reporters Roger Cook and Nick Ross had investigated the four Staffordshire villages.

Checkley and Upper Tean desperately wanted the motorway, and that section was built, but the other two villages did not want the M64, and that section of the motorway was not built.

It was cancelled in 1977.

=== All purpose road replacement ===
By 1979 it was the A564.

The £140m Derby Southern bypass was unveiled in December 1991, after a three month public inquiry in November 1990.

During the 1990s, the A50 between Stoke and Derby was upgraded to dual carriageway instead, following roughly the same route as the middle section of the M64. However, instead of terminating on the M6, the new dual carriageway terminated deep inside the urban area of Stoke on the A500, and at the eastern end, it terminated on the M1 further north than originally planned.

Meanwhile, the M6 Toll motorway was built to ease traffic congestion north of Birmingham.

== See also ==
- List of motorways in the United Kingdom
