= Heron Cross =

Suburb of Stoke-on-Trent, England

Coordinates: 52.9924°N 2.1613°W

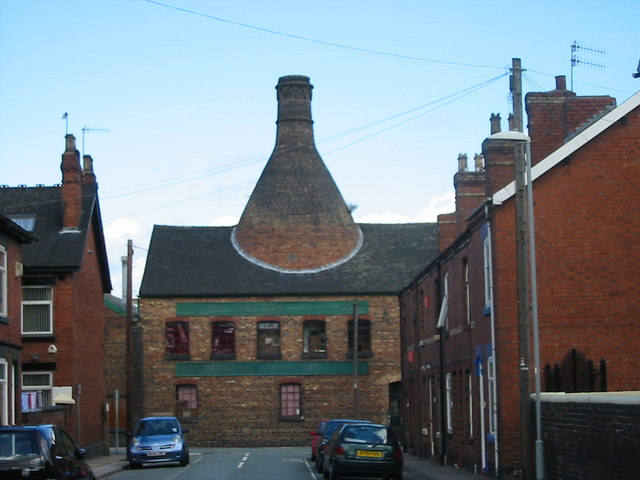
A bottle oven in Chilton Street, Heron Cross

Heron Cross is a suburb situated between Blurton and Fenton, in Stoke on Trent. It has a pharmacy, two corner shops, two pubs, two hairdressers, a park and a pot bank. It has two main streets, Grove Road and Heron Street. Heron Cross is a home to about 1,000 people.

Two schools serve the area:

- Heron Cross Primary School, a primary school for children aged 3 to 11 (nursery to year six).
- Glebedale School, an independent school for children aged 7 and 16 with disabilities
