= Bicker Bar =

Village in Lincolnshire, England

Coordinates: 52.92°N 00.17°W

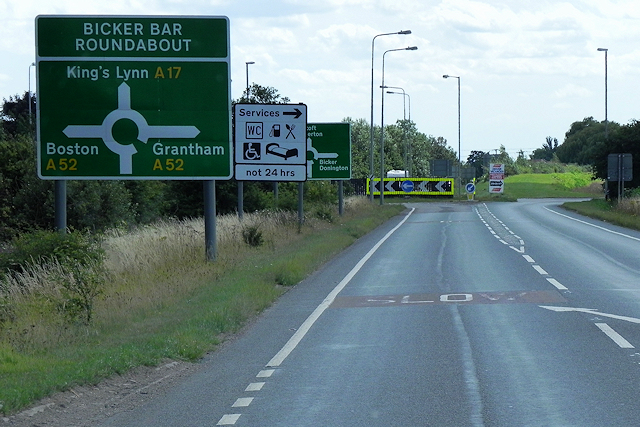
- A17 at Bicker Bar Roundabout

- Location within Lincolnshire
- OS grid reference: TF2338
- Shire county: Lincolnshire
- Region: East Midlands
- Country: England
- Sovereign state: United Kingdom
- Post town: Boston
- Postcode district: PE20
- Police: Lincolnshire
- Fire: Lincolnshire
- Ambulance: East Midlands

Bicker Bar is a village in Lincolnshire, England. It is in the civil parish of Bicker
