= A516 road =

Road in Derbyshire

A516

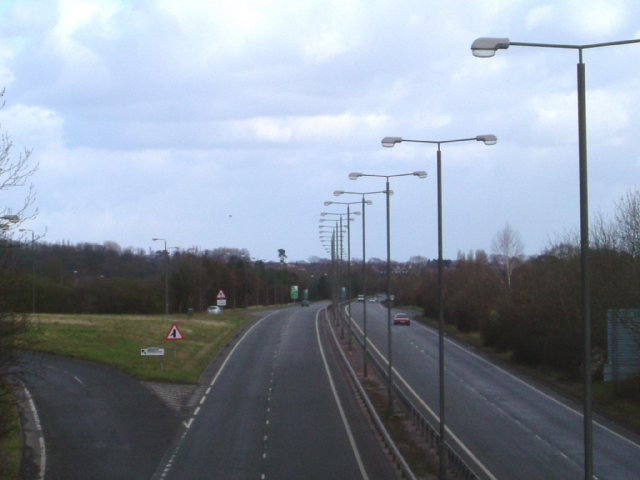
- A516 Mickleover by-pass Looking east along the A516 from the over-bridge

Route information
- Length: 6.7 mi (10.8 km)

Major junctions
- West end: A50 Junction 5
- A50; A5132; A38; A5111; A601
- East end: A601 in Derby

Location
- Country: United Kingdom

Road network
- Roads in the United Kingdom; Motorways; A and B road zones
← A515	→ A517

The A516 road is a road in Derbyshire that runs from the A50 Junction 5, to the A601 in Derby. The road is used mostly for traffic flowing from the A50 to the A38.

== Route ==
The road begins as Derby Road in Hilton, South Derbyshire, at a junction with the A50 (52.8770°N 1.6253°W). The former route through Hilton is now the A5132. The trunk road bypasses Etwall crossing the former GNR Derbyshire and Staffordshire Extension which is now a cycle route (Route 54), finishing at a roundabout; the £2.6m bypass opened in February 1992. At the roundabout on the left is the large Seven Wells pub. The road passes the Total Etwall Road Service Station on the right and climbs a hill. Approaching Mickleover, it becomes a dual-carriageway. Passing the Mickleover Court Hotel, the road enters the City of Derby. The road used to pass through Mickleover, which is now the B5020. The £5.2m Mickleover bypass opened on 19 February 1975. This included two junctions with the A38. It shares the route with the A38, at which point it is three lanes, passing the Mickleover Golf Course to the right. It meets the B5020 former route at a large roundabout becoming non-trunked. On the left is The Mallard, a Beefeater pub next-door to the Derby West Premier Inn, and on the right is the newly extended Royal Derby Hospital. As the dual-carriageway Uttoxeter New Road it meets the A5111 Kingsway at traffic lights. It is dual-carriageway, passing the Bemrose Community School on the right, to another set of traffic lights, at which point the former Uttoxeter Old Road is to the left. It is single carriage way all the way through California, Derby to the A601 at Stafford Street junction (52.9213°N 1.4858°W). A new roundabout is being constructed here as part of the Connecting Derby improvement.
