= Oaks Green =

Village in Derbyshire, England

Coordinates: 52.89°N 01.77°W

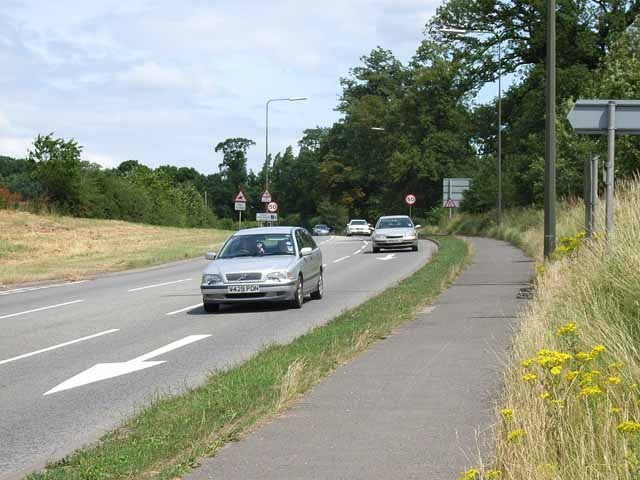
- A515 at Oaks Green.

- Location within Derbyshire
- OS grid reference: SK1533
- Shire county: Derbyshire
- Region: East Midlands
- Country: England
- Sovereign state: United Kingdom
- Post town: Ashbourne
- Postcode district: DE6
- Police: Derbyshire
- Fire: Derbyshire
- Ambulance: East Midlands

Oaks Green is a village located in Derbyshire, England. The village is surrounded by rolling hills, woodland, and streams, characteristic of the region's natural landscape.

The village has a small community in the civil parish of Sudbury.
