= Blurton =

District of Stoke-on-Trent, England

Coordinates: 52.982°N 2.157°W

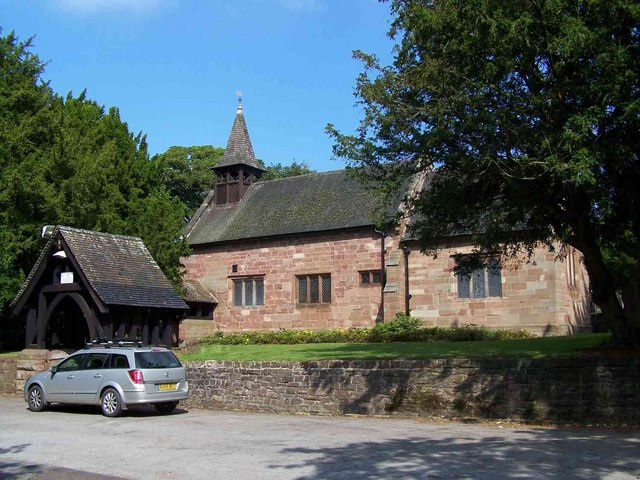
St. Bartholomew church in Blurton

Blurton is a district in the south of Stoke-on-Trent, Staffordshire, England. Hollybush, Old Blurton, Blurton Farm and Newstead are the names of the areas in which make up the area known as Blurton.

== Education ==
Sutherland Primary Academy, The Meadows Primary Academy & Newstead Primary Academy provide co-ed learning for pupils up to the age of 11.

Blurton has one co-ed secondary school. Ormiston Sir Stanley Matthews Academy.

Blurton is also the location of a special educatory needs school called Kemball School.

== Transport ==
First Potteries, part of the FirstGroup, provides two routes in the area.

The 22 goes from Longton to Newcastle-under-Lyme via Blurton, Trentham, Hanford, Trent Vale and Royal Stoke Hospital and vice versa.

23. This route goes to; Newstead, Blurton, Heron Cross, Fenton, Stoke-upon-Trent, Stoke Rail station, Shelton and Hanley / City Centre and reverse.

Via the local bus service you can get a train via the West Coast Main Line to Manchester and London etc. There are also Intercity trains going to places such as Birmingham, Birmingham international (for Birmingham airport and the NEC) with some services going on to Cardiff or the south coast and intermediate stations. The Crewe Derby line which serves both Longton and Stoke is now running trains to Newark Castle via Nottingham.

== Politics ==
Stoke-on-Trent city council is Labour held. Blurton is situated in the Stoke-on-Trent South parliamentary constituency, it is the seat of Allison Gardner of the Labour party.
