= A34 road =

Major road in England

A34

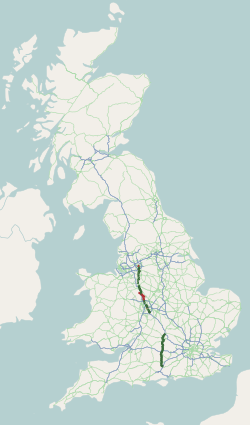

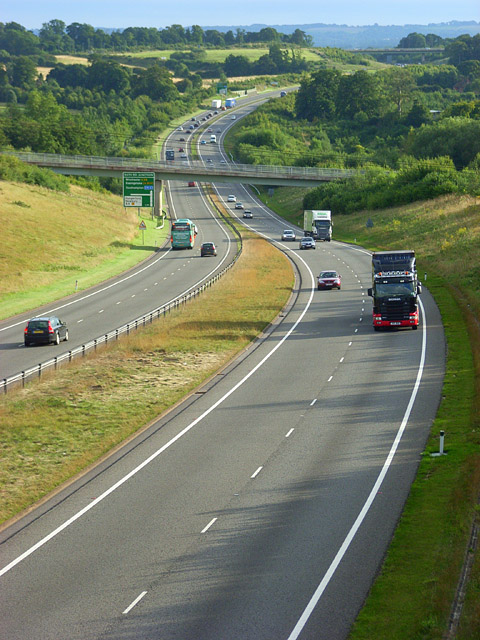
- Newbury bypass, part of the A34 near Donnington

Route information
- Part of E05
- Length: 156.21 mi (251.40 km)
- History: Between Oxford and Birmingham is the A44 and A3400

Major junctions
- South end: M3 at Winchester (51.069°N 1.291°W)
- A303; M4; A44 ( A40) M40; A41 M42; A41; M6; A5 M6 Toll; A51 A500; A53; A54 M56 M60 A57(M); A56
- North end: A6 at Salford(53.483°N 2.258°W)

Location
- Country: United Kingdom
- Primary destinations: Newbury; Oxford; Solihull; Birmingham; Walsall; Cannock; Stafford; Stoke-on-Trent; Newcastle-under-Lyme; Congleton; Wilmslow; East Didsbury; Burnage; Manchester

Road network
- Roads in the United Kingdom; Motorways; A and B road zones
← A33	→ A35

The A34 is a major road in England. It runs from the A33 and M3 at Winchester in Hampshire, to the A6 and A6042 in Salford, close to Manchester City Centre. It forms a large part of the major trunk route from Southampton, via Oxford, to Birmingham, The Potteries and Manchester. For most of its length (together with the A5011 and parts of the A50, and A49), it forms part of the former Winchester–Preston Trunk Road. Improvements to the section of road forming the Newbury Bypass around Newbury were the scene of significant direct action environmental protests in the 1990s. It is 151 miles (243 km) long.

== Route ==
The road is in two sections. The northern section runs south through Manchester and Cheadle, and bypasses Handforth, Wilmslow and Alderley Edge, before passing through Congleton, Newcastle-under-Lyme, and the southern suburbs of Stoke-on-Trent. It then continues south via Stone, Stafford, Cannock and Walsall, passes through the middle of Birmingham (where it briefly merges with the A41), before meeting the M42 motorway at junction 4 south of Solihull.

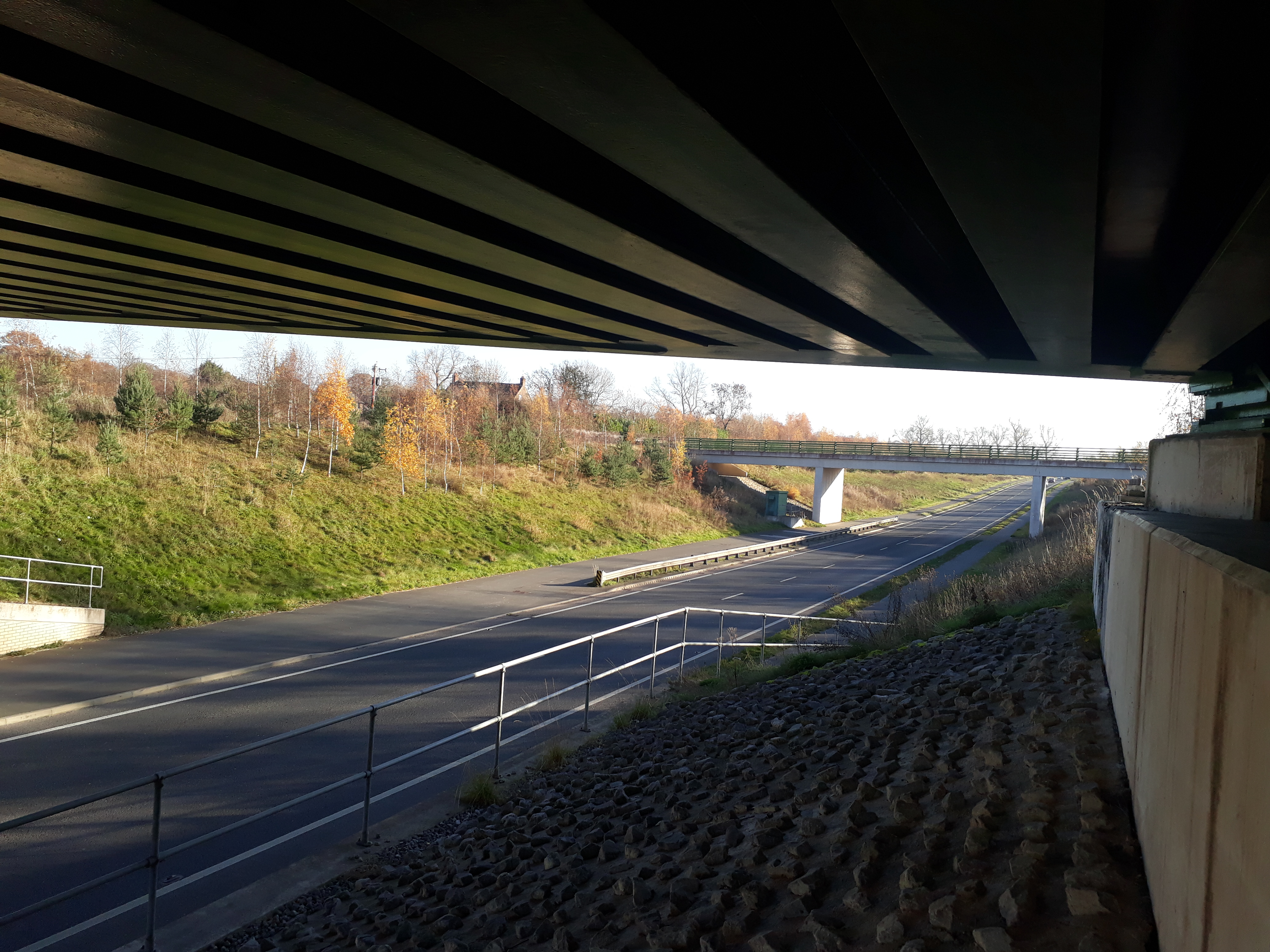
A34 Melrose Way–Alderley Edge bypass

The northern section of the road in effect combines with the motorway network and then resumes with the southern section.

The southern section begins 45 miles (72 km) SSE of the northern section, at junction 9 of the M40 motorway. It continues south as the western part of the Oxford Ring Road, crossing the River Thames on the A34 Road Bridge. It then bypasses Abingdon, Didcot, and Newbury before finishing at junction 9 of the M3 motorway. This part of the A34 forms the E05 European route. It is a dual carriageway throughout.

Together with parts of the M3 and the M40, the A34 forms an important route carrying freight from Southampton to the Midlands. Because of the volume of traffic, bypasses were built along this route – at Newbury on the A34, and at Twyford Down near Winchester on the M3 – but these were controversial for environmental reasons. Notably instead of cutting a short road tunnel through Twyford Down, the escarpment was carved out for the road traffic of the motorway, though the route of the old A33 closed as a result.

The junction with the M4 motorway was originally a simple roundabout interchange, but was re-engineered in 2004 so that the A34 would also have grade separation.

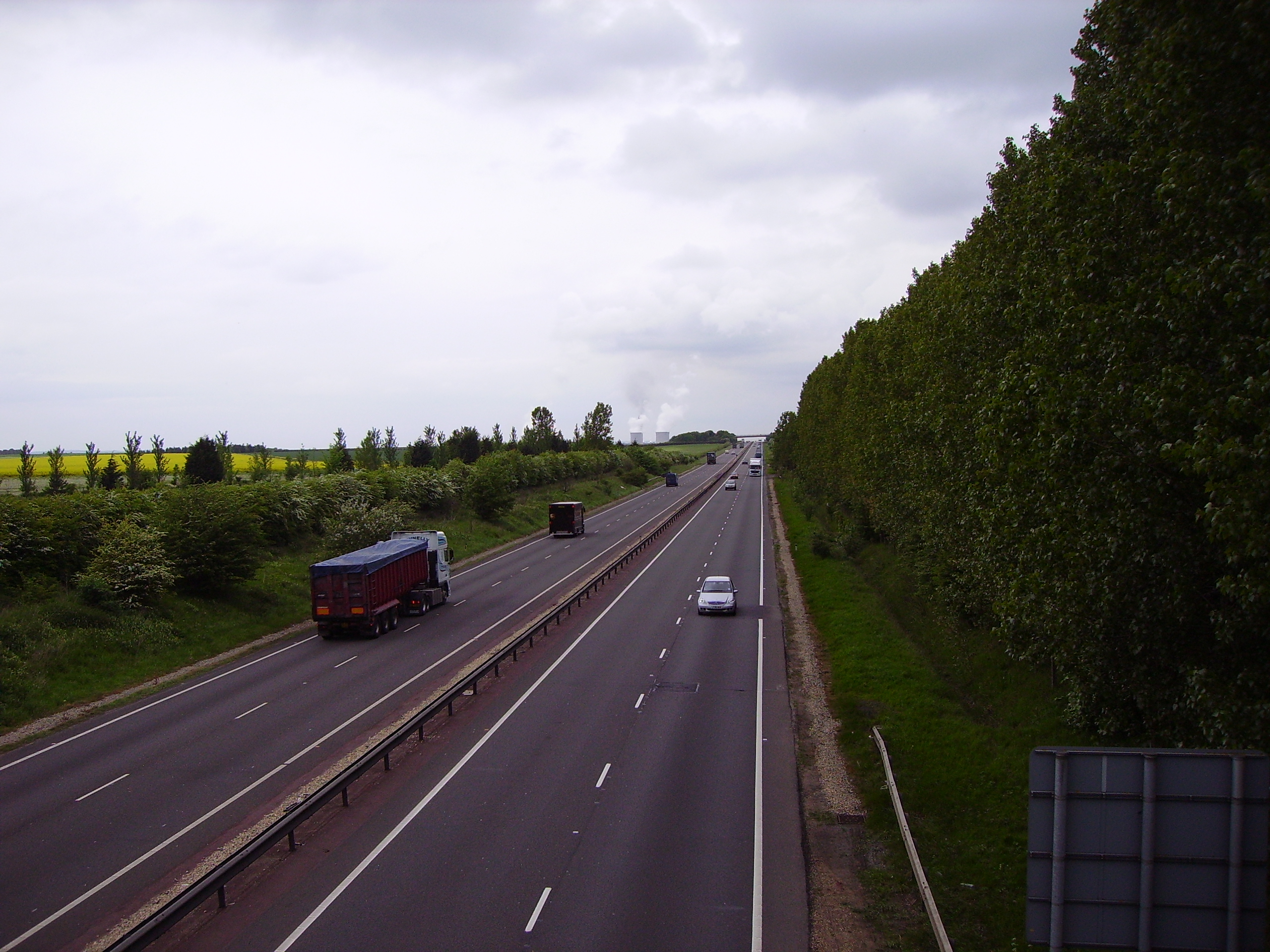
The A34 looking North towards Didcot, in Oxfordshire, with the now demolished Didcot power station cooling towers visible

== History and renumbering ==
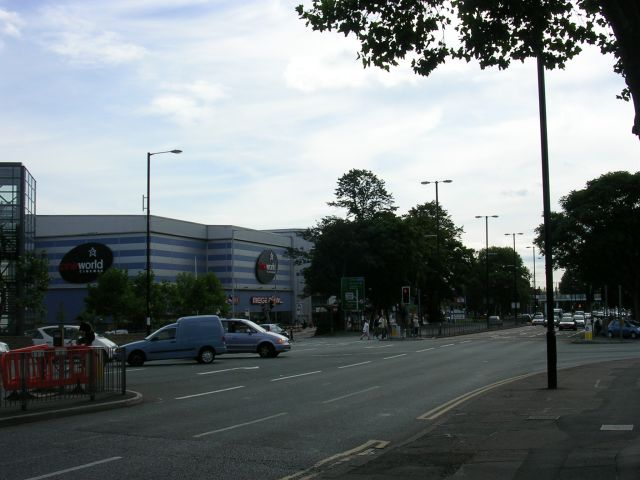
Kingsway in Manchester where the A34 nears the end of its route

The original (1922) route of the A34 was Winchester to Oxford, much shorter than it is today. It was extended to Manchester on 1 April 1935, replacing part of the A42 (Oxford to Birmingham through Shipston-on-Stour, Stratford-upon-Avon and Henley-in-Arden), A455 (Birmingham to Stafford), part of the A449 (Stafford to Newcastle-under-Lyme) and A526 (Newcastle to Manchester).

By 1953 the route was as follows:

- Manchester
- Levenshulme
- Burnage
- East Didsbury
- Cheadle
- Wilmslow
- Alderley Edge
- Congleton
- Talke
- Newcastle-under-Lyme
- Stone bypass
- Stafford
- Cannock
- Bloxwich
- Walsall
- Birmingham
- Shirley
- Henley-in-Arden
- Wootton Wawen
- Stratford-on-Avon
- Newbold-on-Stour
- Shipston-on-Stour
- Long Compton
- (1 mile (1.6 km) east of Chipping Norton)
- Enstone
- Woodstock
- Oxford
- Abingdon
- Steventon
- East Ilsley
- Newbury
- Litchfield
- Whitchurch
- Sutton Scotney
- Winchester

When the Oxford Ring Road was completed to the west of Oxford in 1962, the old route through the city was renumbered the A4144. On completion of the Abingdon Bypass in the 1970s, the old route from the Oxford Ring Road through Abingdon and Steventon to Chilton was partly declassified (for 5 miles (8.0 km)) and the rest renumbered A4183, B4017, A4130 and A4185.

In 1987, the A34 between Walsall and Bloxwich swapped routes with the parallel B4210.

In 1991, shortly after the completion of the M40 motorway, the road between Oxford and Solihull was renumbered. Between Chipping Norton and Solihull the road lost its primary route status and was renumbered A3400, and south of Chipping Norton the route became part of an extended A44. The A34 was diverted north from the Oxford Ring Road to the M40 along parts of the former routes of the A43 (which had originally followed the route of the present B430) and A421. Much of the long-distance traffic formerly carried by the present A3400 now uses the M40 to Birmingham, and the M42 and M6 to by-pass the city.

When the Newbury Bypass was opened in 1998, the old route through Newbury became part of the A339 and the B4640.

The long planned and often postponed Alderley Edge bypass was completed in November 2010, ahead of schedule and within the £52 million budget. The official opening ceremony was conducted by the Chancellor of the Exchequer, the Rt Hon George Osborne MP, on 19 November 2010.
