= Listed buildings in Whaley Bridge =

Whaley Bridge is a civil parish in the High Peak district of Derbyshire, England. The parish contains 27 listed buildings that are recorded in the National Heritage List for England. Of these, two are listed at Grade II*, the middle of the three grades, and the others are at Grade II, the lowest grade. The parish contains the town of Whaley Bridge and the surrounding area. The Peak Forest Canal passes through the parish, and the listed buildings associated with it are an aqueduct, a horse tunnel, and a transhipment warehouse. Most of the other listed buildings are houses, cottages and associated structures, farmhouses and farm buildings. The rest of the listed buildings include churches and a chapel, a hotel and a public house, a road bridge, a milestone, a colliery air shaft tower, and a railway bridge.

== Key ==
Grade	Criteria
II*	Particularly important buildings of more than special interest
II	Buildings of national importance and special interest

== Buildings ==
Name and location	Photograph	Date	Notes	Grade
Jodrell Arms Hotel; 53.33039°N 1.98436°W		16th century	The hotel, which has been extended and much altered through the centuries, dates mainly from the 19th century. It is in stone, partly rendered, and has a Welsh slate roof with coped gables, kneelers and finials. There are two storeys, and an entrance front of three gabled bays, the middle bay recessed. In the centre is a porch with Tuscan columns, an entablature and a cornice. In the left return is a Victorian Jacobean front, and the right return contains a doorway with a rusticated surround.	II
St James' Church, Taxal; 53.31523°N 1.99169°W		16th century	The oldest part of the church is the tower, the nave was rebuilt in 1825, and the church was restored in 1887–89. It is built in gritstone with a slate roof, and consists of a nave, a south porch, a chancel with a northeast vestry and a southeast organ chamber, and a west tower. The tower has three stages, diagonal buttresses, a west doorway with a pointed arch, over which is a three-light Perpendicular window, and on the south front is a clock face. The top stage contains two-light bell openings with Y-tracery, over which is an embattled parapet with pinnacles.	II*
Yeardsley Hall; 53.34431°N 1.99222°W		16th or early 17th century	A large house that was extended by the addition of a wing in the 18th century, it in stone with string courses, a parapet, and a slate roof with coped gables and kneelers. The house mainly has two storeys, and an irregular plan. In the angle with the wing is a porch with a segmental-arched entrance, and there is an eight-light mullioned and transomed window.	II
Hockerley Hall Farmhouse; 53.33576°N 1.98969°W		17th century (probable)	The farmhouse is in stone and has a stone slate roof with ball finials. There are two storeys and four bays, the right bay gabled. On the front is a gabled porch with ball finials, and the windows are mullioned.	II
Lodgewood Cottages; 53.31813°N 1.99318°W		Mid 17th century	A house, later divided into two, is in gritstone with quoins and a stone slate roof. There are two storeys and attics, and three bays, the outer bays gabled and projecting at the rear. The windows on the front are sashes, and elsewhere they are mullioned.	II
Oldfield Farm; 53.29788°N 1.98765°W		17th century	A farmhouse and attached cottage in gritstone, with stone slate roofs, coped gables and moulded kneelers. There is an elongated L-shaped plan with an addition at the west end. The original doorway, which is blocked, has a quoined surround, a massive lintel and a hood mould. The windows in the original part either have a single light or are mullioned, and those in the addition are casements.	II
The Carr; 53.32369°N 1.98394°W	—	17th century	A house that has been altered and extended, it is in rendered stone with a roof of stone slate, and Welsh slate on the extension. The house is mainly in three storeys, with windows of varying types.	II
Bings Farmhouse and barn 53.33168°N 1.97885°W	—	Early 18th century	The farmhouse and attached barn are in stone with quoins and roofs mainly of stone slate. The house has two storeys and a projecting wing on the left. There is a blocked doorway with a shaped, initialled and dated lintel, above which is a small round-headed window.	II
42 Old Road; 53.32751°N 1.98260°W	—	1742	A farmhouse, later a private house, it is in stone with a stone slate roof. There are two storeys and two bays. The door lintel is inscribed with initials and the date, there is one sash window and the other windows are modern replacements.	II
40 Old Road; 53.32749°N 1.98273°W		18th century	A house in painted stone used at one time as a mill. There are three storeys and an irregular plan. To the left of the doorway are two bay windows.	II
Rose Cottage; 53.32299°N 1.98324°W		18th century	A row of three stone cottages with a stone slate roof. There are two storeys and four bays. Some windows are sashes, and the others are replacements. The doorway of the middle cottage has a moulded surround, a shouldered architrave, a moulded cornice, and a pediment with modillions.	II
19–23 Old Road; 53.32723°N 1.98298°W	—	Late 18th century	A farmhouse and outbuildings converted for residential use, the building is in stone with quoins and a Welsh slate roof. There are two storeys, four bays and a projecting single-storey outbuilding on the right. The windows are modern casements, and there is a modern porch.	II
Kishfield Bridge; 53.32300°N 2.00979°W		Late 18th century (probable)	The bridge carries Start Lane over Todd Brook. It is in brown sandstone, and consists of a slightly recessed, low segmental arch. The bridge has a plain parapet with flat coping.	II
Horse tunnel 53.33732°N 1.98069°W		1794–1801 (presumed)	An aqueduct carrying the Peak Forest Canal over a horse tunnel. It is in stone, and consists of a segmental arch with voussoirs. The retaining walls are concave, and have parapets that are coped on the north, and they end in piers.	II
New House Farmhouse; 53.32838°N 2.01079°W		1795	The farmhouse is in stone with rusticated quoins and a stone slate roof. There are two storeys and three bays. On the front are two doorways, sash windows and an initialled datestone.	II
Carr Lodge; 53.32327°N 1.98342°W	—	1802	A stone house with quoins, two storeys and three bays, the left corner canted. The doorway and flanking windows have lintels with keystone. The date is on the wood surround under the lintel of the doorway.	II
Methodist Church and Sunday School; 53.32764°N 1.98357°W		1821	The church and Sunday school are in stone with rusticated quoins. The building is in three parts, the central part the earliest, with the chapel added to the left in 1867, and the schoolroom later to the right. The centre part has two storeys and three bay, with round-headed windows in the upper floor and in the ground floor are segmental -arched windows, and an arched doorway with a fanlight and a keystone. The chapel has a single storey and three bays, the middle bay gabled, and the schoolroom has three storeys and two bays.	II
Canal Cottage and former stable block 53.33111°N 1.98374°W		Early 19th century	The cottage and former stable block are in painted stone with Welsh slate roofs and two storeys. The cottage has three bays, and contains sash windows, and two doorways with rectangular fanlights. The stable block attached to the left has two bays, with windows above carriage doors.	II
Milestone; 53.34275°N 1.98562°W		Early 19th century	The milestone is on the west side of Buxton Road (A6 road). It consists of an upright stone slab with a round top, inscribed with the distances to Stockport and Buxton.	II
Taxal Rectory; 53.31496°N 1.99253°W	—	Early 19th century	The rectory, which possibly has earlier origins, is in painted stone. There are two storeys and three gabled bays, the left bay projecting. The windows are sashes, and the doorway has pilasters, a narrow entablature and flanking lights.	II
White Hart Public House; 53.32888°N 1.98331°W		Early 19th century	The public house has an earlier core, and the front dates from later in the 19th century. It is in stone at the rear, and rendered, carved as stone and painted, on a plinth at the front, with quoins. There are two storeys and three bays, the left bay canted. The doorway has a small cornice, and the windows are sashes.	II
Canal Warehouse; 53.33152°N 1.98366°W		1832	The warehouse, which was extended in 1916, straddles the canal, and was built for transhipment between the Peak Forest Canal and the High Peak Tramway. It is built in stone and has coped gables. There are three gabled bays, each containing a segmental arch with a rusticated surround and a keystone, the middle arch smaller. In the middle gable is a plaque, and along the sides are five windows. At the canal end is a boat entry in the middle, over which is a window and a hoist door.	II*
Aqueduct Bridge; 53.34958°N 1.98896°W		Early to mid 19th century	The aqueduct carries the Peak Forest Canal over a stream. It is in stone, and consists of a round-headed arch with a cornice and a coped parapet.	II
Colliery Air Shaft Tower; 53.32728°N 1.98250°W		Mid 19th century	The tower is in red sandstone, and has a parapet with triangular-shaped coping. There is a square plan, and it has a smaller square top. The tower contains various irregular window openings from its later use as storage premises.	II
Railway bridge 53.32732°N 1.98422°W		c. 1863	The bridge was built by the Stockport, Disley and Whaley Bridge Railway to carry its line over Buxton Road (A5004 road). It is in cast iron with gritstone abutments, and consists of a single segmental arch with four iron ribs joined in the centre. The bridge has five rectangular headed openings in the spandrels, a cornice and a solid parapet.	II
Fernilee Methodist Chapel and railings 53.30736°N 1.97531°W	—	1871	The chapel is in blue brick with white brick quoins, and dressings in red and white brick. There are two storeys, an eaves cornice, and a gabled front. On the front is a gabled porch containing an arched entrance with pilasters. The porch is flanked by round-arched windows, and above it is a datestone. Along the sides are round-arched windows with impost and sill bands. In front of the chapel are low stone walls with railings, and over the entrance is a lamp holder and lamp.	II
Holy Trinity Church and wall 53.32462°N 1.98546°W		1903–04	The church, which was extended in 1922–23, is in gritstone with a slate roof. It has an irregular cruciform plan, consisting of a nave, a chancel, a north porch and vestries, and a south organ chamber. At the junction of the nave and chancel is a diagonally-set square bell tower with a shallow pyramidal roof. To the rear of the church is an attached boundary wall.	II
