= Furness Vale =

Village in England

Coordinates: 53.349°N 1.990°W

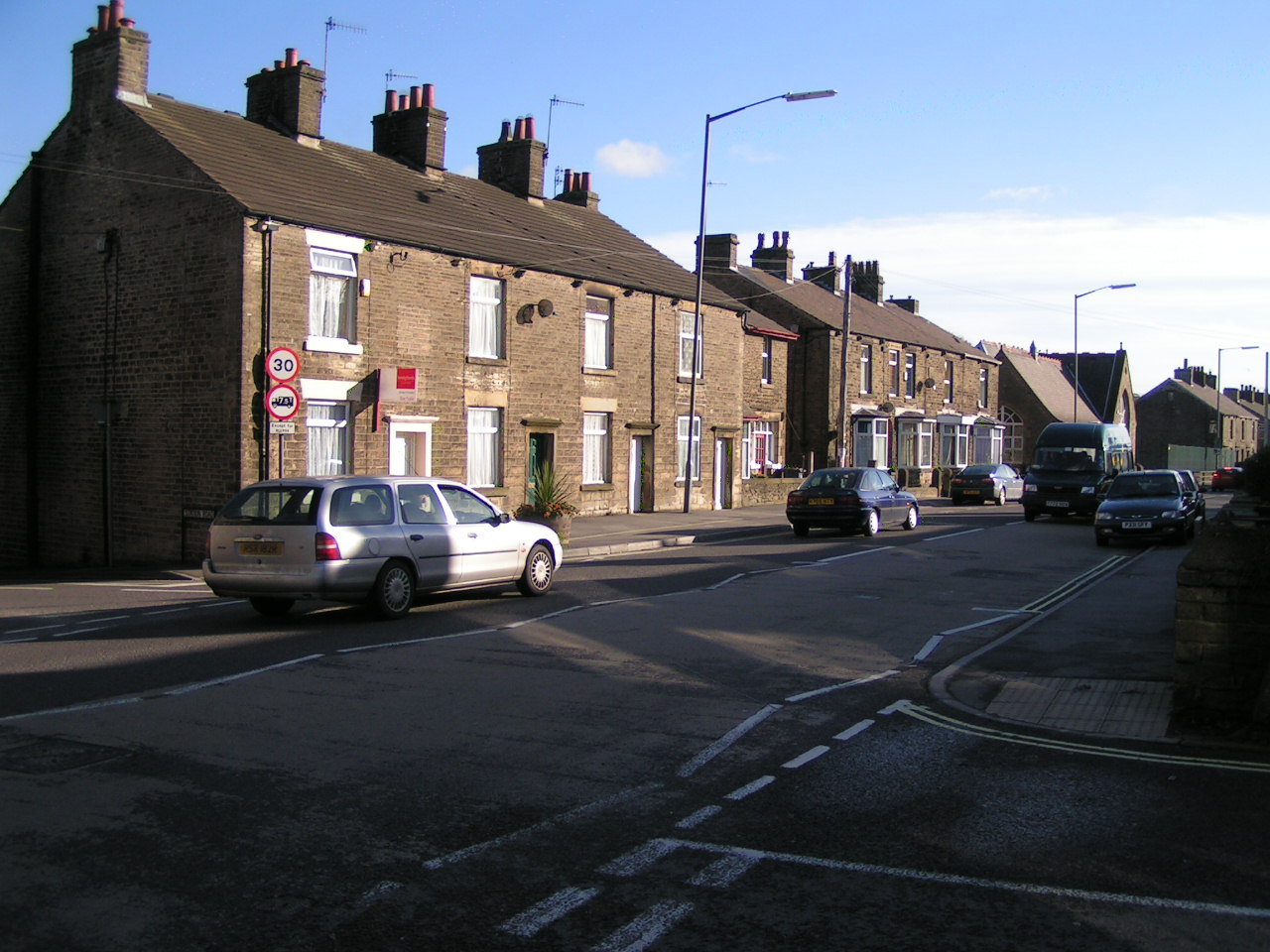
- The A6 passes through Furness Vale.

- Location within Derbyshire
- Population: 1,500
- OS grid reference: SK007835
- District: High Peak
- Shire county: Derbyshire
- Region: East Midlands
- Country: England
- Sovereign state: United Kingdom
- Post town: HIGH PEAK
- Postcode district: SK23
- Dialling code: 01663
- Police: Derbyshire
- Fire: Derbyshire
- Ambulance: East Midlands
- UK Parliament: High Peak

Furness Vale is a village in the High Peak district of Derbyshire, England, between New Mills and Whaley Bridge. It is bisected by the A6 road and the Peak Forest Canal, whose towpath is followed by the Goyt Way, part of the 230-mile (370 km) Midshires Way. It comes under the administration of Whaley Bridge town council and has a population of approximately 1,500.

The village has a small community primary school for boys and girls aged 4–11. For secondary education, children travel to Chapel-en-le-Frith, New Mills, Hope Valley or Buxton. There is one pub, The Crossing (the Soldier Dick on the A6 closed in 2022), a social club, a railway station and a fish and chip shop. The post office closed around 2015 and has been converted into a domestic dwelling. The social club is now used as a post office twice a week.

There were once both Methodist and Anglican churches in Furness Vale. Methodists met at various locations, including Howcroft Farm, from 1812 onwards, and their first school and chapel were built on Yeardsley Lane in 1822. A new Methodist church was built on Station Road in 1840. The church building closed in 2002, with a war memorial being moved to the Anglican church, St John's on Buxton Road, and the Methodist congregation continuing to meet at the latter church. St John's was dedicated on 23 March 1912, but closed in 2025 and was put up for sale.

Since 2008, the village has hosted a free music event on its football field in order to raise funds for the development of the field itself. It is held on a Saturday during the summer months and is organised by a committee of local residents.

The village football side, Furness Vale Rovers F.C., entered the 1886–87 FA Cup, losing in the first round.

== See also ==
- Furness Vale railway station
