= Catania and Mount Etna =

Oil sketch by Ed Lear

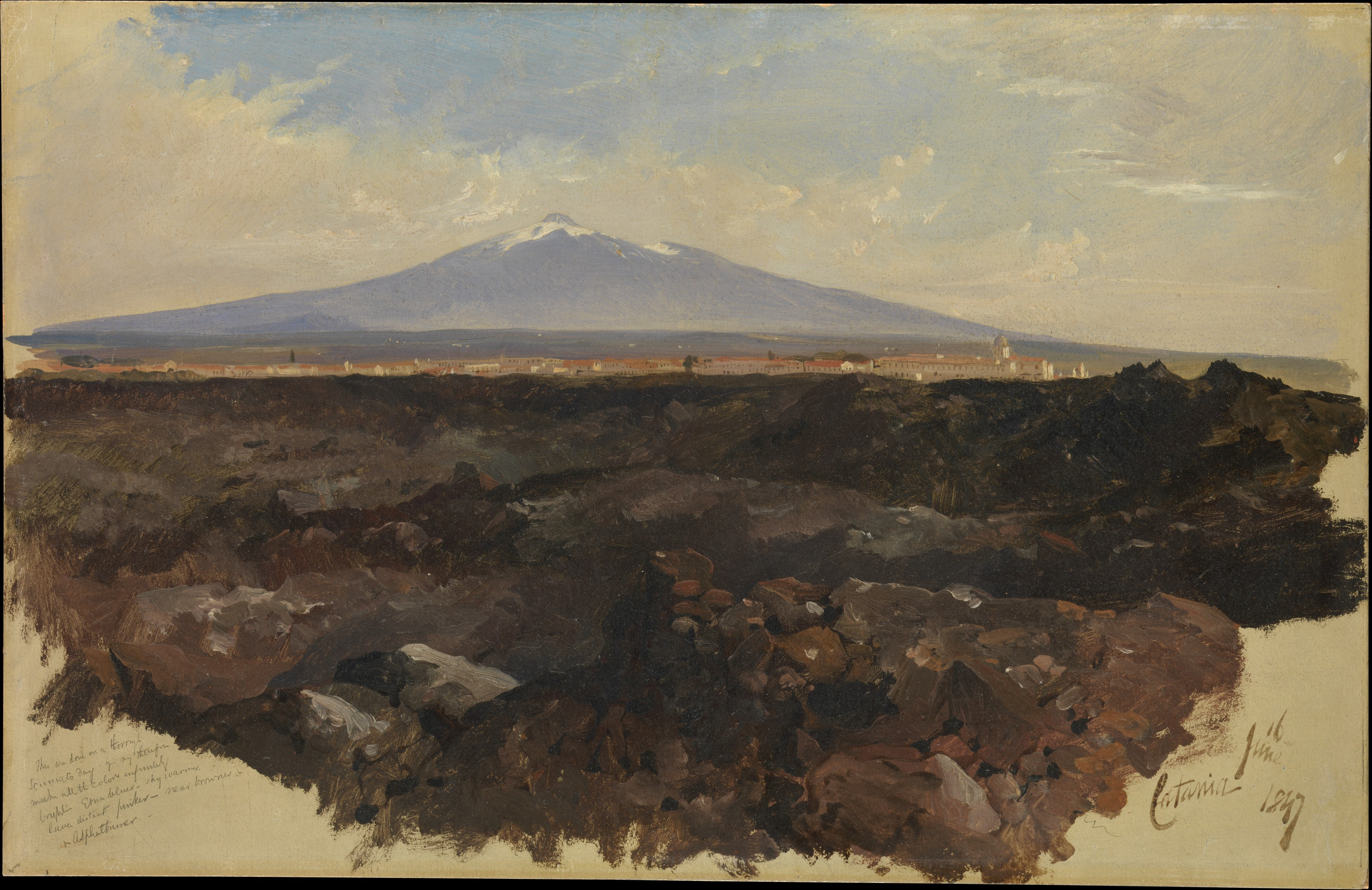
- Artist: Edward Lear
- Year: 1847
- Dimensions: 31.1 cm × 48.3 cm (12.2 in × 19.0 in)
- Location: Metropolitan Museum of Art; New York City

Catania and Mount Etna is a mid 19th century oil sketch by the British artist and poet Edward Lear. Done in oil on board, the work depicts Mount Etna and the surrounding Sicilian countryside near Catania. The drawing is currently in the collection of the Metropolitan Museum of Art in New York City.

== Description ==
=== Background ===
A member of the British middle class, Edward Lear (1812—1888) traveled extensively in Continental Europe. In 1842 Lear began a series of excursions in Italy (then a divided series of states), during which he visited a number of regions and cities. Lear's trips to the Italian peninsula took place over a number of years, and in the summer of 1847 (after spending the winter in Rome) he visited the island of Sicily. Lear was impressed by Sicily's history, scenery, and the artist went on to paint dozens of works depicting the island.

In June 1847, Lear and his friend John Proby visited the countryside near Mount Etna, a volcano near the Sicilian city of Catania. On 16 June, Lear sketched a notable drawing of Mount Etna and Catania, now known as Catania and Mount Etna. The following evening, Lear and Proby traveled to the mountain and ascended the volcanic cone.

=== Drawing ===
Lear's drawing depicts the landscape of Eastern Sicily. The city of Catania can be seen in the midground, and a snow-capped Mount Etna can be seen in the background.
