= A5004 road =

Road in England

A5004

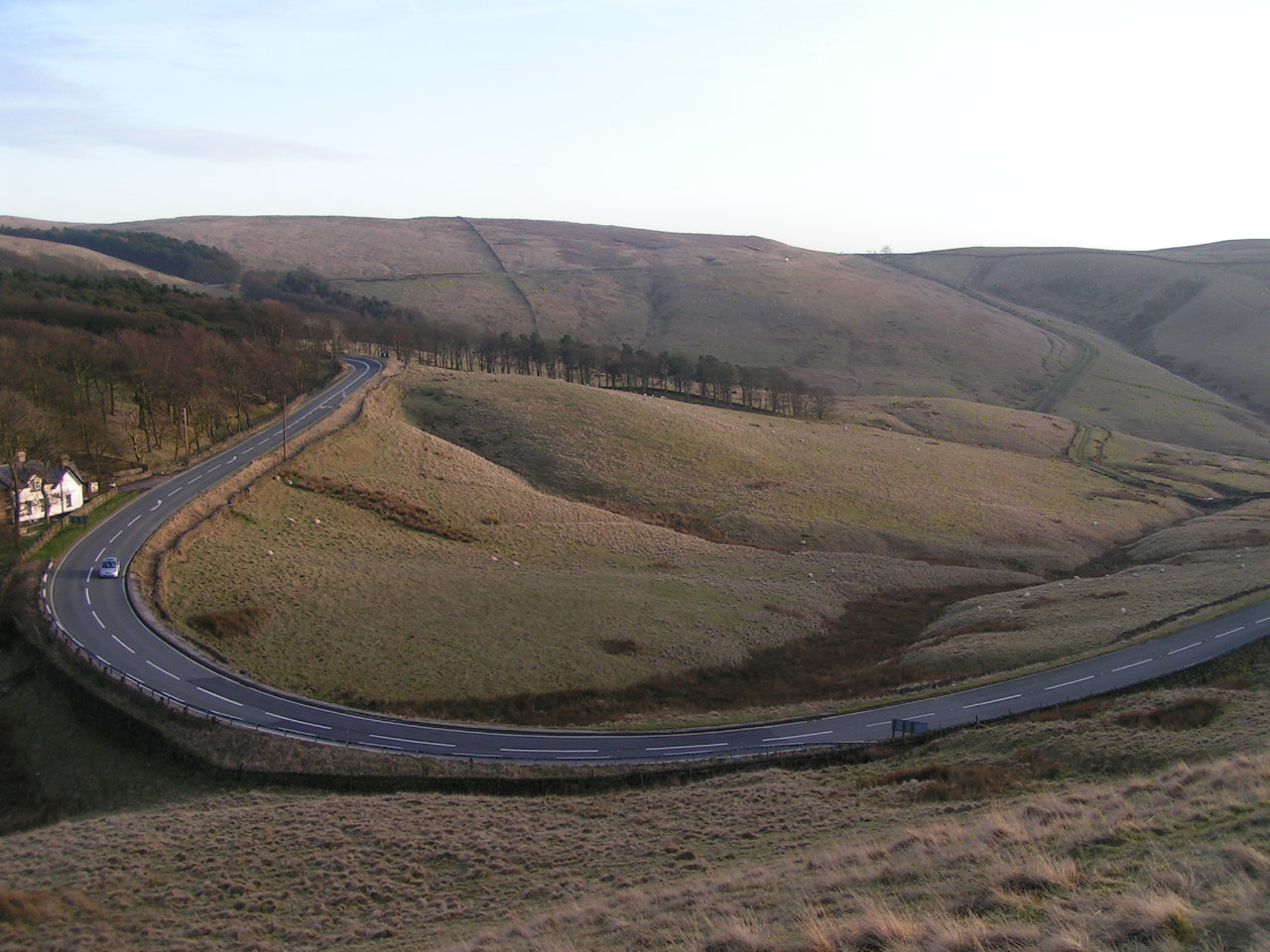
- The A5004 from Hanging Rock, between Buxton and Fernilee

Route information
- Length: 7.8 mi (12.6 km)

Major junctions
- From: Buxton, Derbyshire
- A53; A6
- To: Whaley Bridge, Derbyshire

Location
- Country: United Kingdom
- Constituent country: England

Road network
- Roads in the United Kingdom; Motorways; A and B road zones
← A5001	→ A5005

The A5004 is an A road in Derbyshire, England running north from Buxton to Whaley Bridge. A large section of the road is called Long Hill. It was formerly part of the A6. It runs through a scenic area of the Peak District National Park. In 2010 it was named as the seventh most dangerous road in Britain.

== Route ==
The road starts at the junction with the A53 just north of Buxton Opera House, where it is called Manchester Road. It climbs out of Buxton in a series fairly gentle curves in a northwesterly direction, reaching its summit at 427m (1400 feet) at the eastern edge of Wild Moor. At this point it crosses the watershed between the North Sea and Irish Sea, and starts to descend into the valley of the River Goyt via a series of sharp bends. The former route that descended into a branch valley before climbing back onto the current route can be clearly seen to the west. The road then straightens for about 3/4 mi (1.2 km) before entering a second series of curves before passing the hamlet of Fernilee. After Fernilee there is a third series of bends that bring the road to Whaley Bridge. The Western side of the road between Fernilee and Whaley Bridge is embanked behind a retaining wall. Failure of this wall in several places has caused some subsidence.

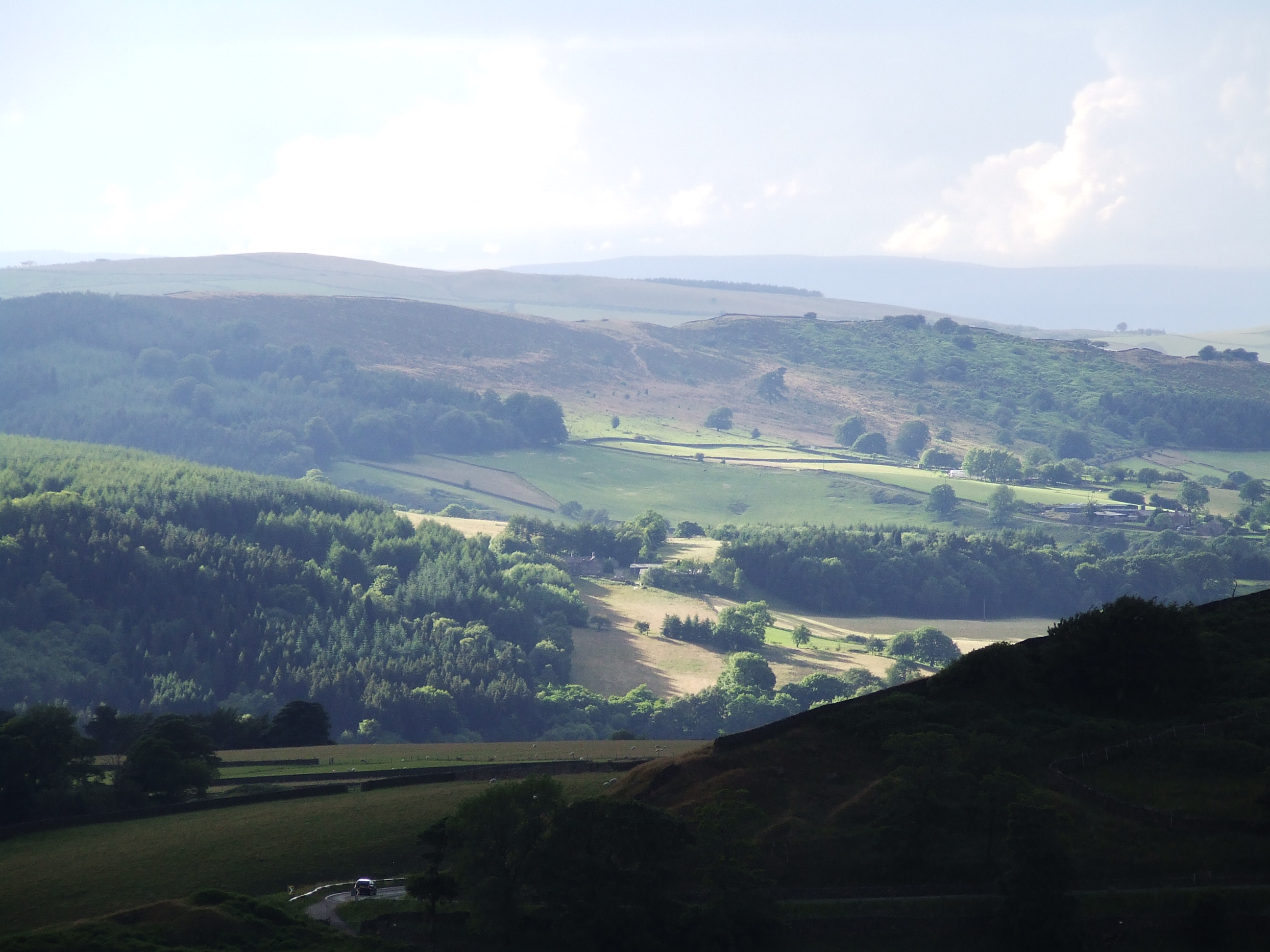
The A5004 (foreground) descending the Goyt Valley

The road enters Whaley Bridge at Horwich End, where there are traffic lights at a junction with the B5470 (Chapel-en-le-Frith to Macclesfield road), commonly known as 'The Highwayman'. It is then crossed by the Buxton Line railway on the Grade II-listed arched iron Buxton Road Bridge. The A5004 continues north, forming the main street of Whaley Bridge before terminating at a roundabout with the A6 at Bridgemont.

== Usage ==
The A5004 is the shortest route between Buxton and Whaley Bridge and so is used by local traffic and by drivers seeking a shortcut to avoid the A6 from Buxton to Bridgemont via Dove Holes. For most of its length it passes alongside the picturesque Goyt Valley, which is one of the most visited areas of the Peak District National Park, and the road is the main access route to the valley. Thus, particularly during the summer, there can be a large amount of tourist traffic on the road, including cyclists and walkers. The route also forms one part of the well-known 'Cat and Fiddle – Long Hill – Highwayman' triangle, which is particularly attractive to motorcyclists because of the frequency and severity of the bends. Given this mixture of usage, the number and sharpness of the bends and the fact that it is not uncommon to encounter straying livestock on the road it is necessary to employ a great deal of caution. Severe winter weather can also make the road extremely hazardous.
