= Yeardsley cum Whaley Urban District =

Former local government district in Cheshire, UK

Coordinates: 53.3349°N 1.9995°W

Yeardsley cum Whaley
- Urban District
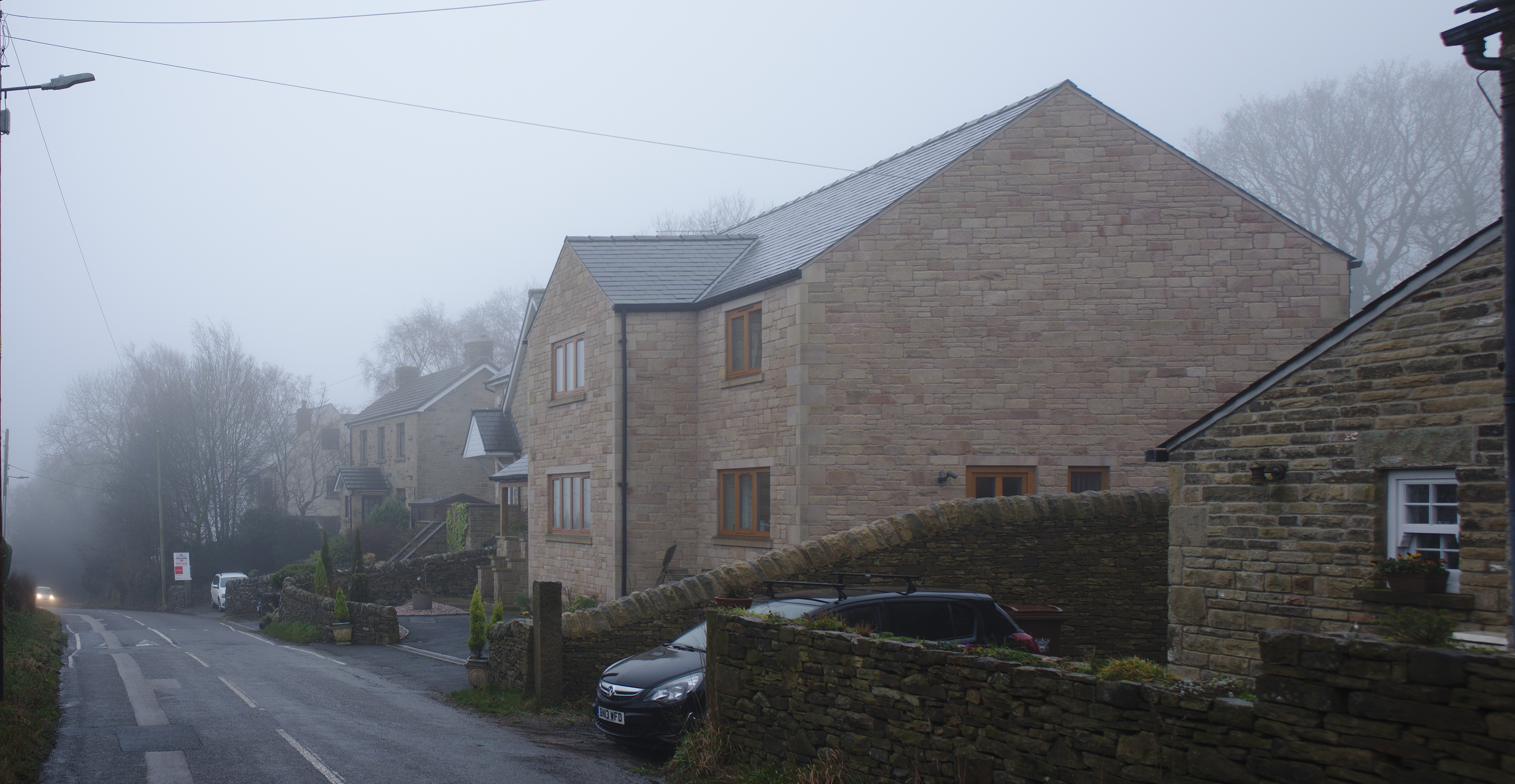
- Population
  - 1931: 1,745
- History
  - Created: 1894
  - Abolished: 1936
  - Succeeded by: Whaley Bridge Urban District; Disley Rural District
- Contained within
  - County: Cheshire

Yeardsley cum Whaley Urban District was an urban district in Cheshire, England, in the Whaley Bridge area. It contained only the parish of Yeardsley cum Whalley. It was created in 1894 and abolished on 1 April 1936 when it was absorbed by Whaley Bridge Urban District, Derbyshire and Disley Rural District, Cheshire. Later the Whaley bridge urban district itself was absorbed into the High Peak district In the Local Government Act 1972.

== History ==
Whaley-cum-Yeardsley was historically a township in the ancient parish of Taxall, in 1866, the legal definition of 'parish' was changed to be the areas used for administering the poor laws, and so Yeardsley cum Whalley became a civil parish. At the 1931 census (the last before the abolition of the parish), Yeardsley cum Whalley had a population of 1745.
