= Cat and Fiddle Road =

Upland road in North Western England

Coordinates: 53.24412°N 1.99996°W

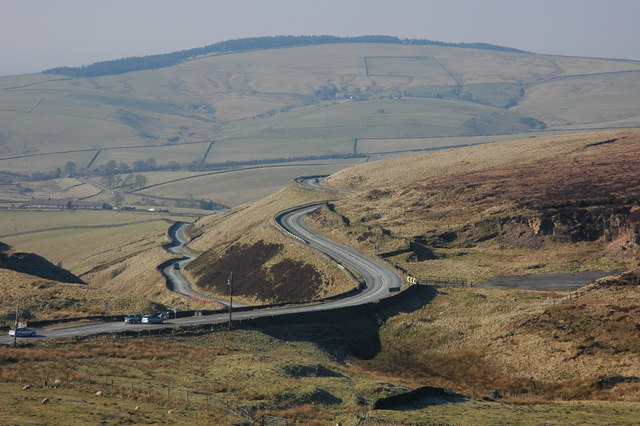
View of a junction on the A537 near the Cat and Fiddle Inn. Macclesfield Forest can be seen on the horizon.

The Cat and Fiddle is a road in England between Buxton, Derbyshire and Macclesfield, Cheshire, named after the Cat and Fiddle Inn public house at its summit. Formed by parts of the A537, A54 and A53, it is famous for its scenic views across the Greater Manchester conurbation, the Peak District National Park and the Cheshire Plain, and for its many bends. It is extremely popular with motorcyclists, and is often classed as the most dangerous road in the United Kingdom.

== Route ==
The road takes its name from the Cat and Fiddle Inn which is at an elevation of 1,690 feet (520 m). The road can be considered to start in Buxton at the junction of the A53 and A5004 Long Hill road just north of the Buxton Opera House. It follows the A53 through the western outskirts of Buxton until a right turn onto the A54 at Ladmanlow. It then climbs in a series of sharp bends onto the flat moorland of Goyt's Moss, where it runs as the A537 in a fairly straight line until it reaches the Cat and Fiddle Inn (which closed in late 2016 and reopened as a distillery and bottle shop in 2020). From the inn, it descends to Macclesfield via a continuous series of sharp, and often blind, bends.

== Usage ==
It is one of only two roads into Macclesfield from the east and thus carries long-distance as well as local traffic, including heavy goods vehicles. It also carries tourist traffic into the Peak District National Park, including cyclists and walkers. It is part of the "Cat and Fiddle – Long Hill – Highwayman" triangle, which is particularly attractive to motorcyclists because of the frequency and severity of the bends. Given this mixture of usage, the number and sharpness of the bends and the frequent straying livestock on the road, a great deal of caution is needed. Bad winter weather can make the road even more hazardous.

The Cat and Fiddle Road was used as part of the route of the third stage of the 2016 Tour of Britain from Congleton to Tatton Park, forming the longest and highest climb of that year's race.

== Road safety initiatives ==
A 2016 report indicates that between 2007 and 2011, there were 44 serious or fatal crashes on the 7.5 mile stretch. Between 2002 and 2006, there were 35. The report states that the safety issue is caused by "severe bends, steep falls from the carriageway and edged by dry-stone walls for almost the entirety of the road".

As a result, the speed limit on the section between Macclesfield and the Cat and Fiddle Inn was reduced to 50 mph (80 km/h) from the national 60 mph (97 km/h) limit. The road is regularly patrolled by unmarked police cars and motorcycles and a mobile speed camera van is used most weekends during the summer. A police aircraft is often used in conjunction with these to enforce the speed limit.

The road was named as the UK's most dangerous in a 2008 survey. The single-carriageway route was the location of 21 fatal and serious crashes and was rated in the EuroRAP report as Black, the highest risk rating. This was in spite of a number of countermeasures installed by the road authority, including motorcycle-friendly barriers. The Foundation attributed this high number of accidents to road user behaviour; indeed, when motorcycle-related collisions are removed from the results the road became one of the safest in the country.

Cheshire County Council also pointed the finger at motorcyclists' behaviour:

"The fact is that it’s an attractive road to motorcyclists – they see it as a challenge to ride with its hairpin bends, limited views, downhill descent and uphill ascent. The thing that angers us most is not the fact that it’s dangerous, but that there are a group of people on that road who knowingly push the boundaries. We have tried to get the message across, that it is the emergency services that have to pick these people up off the road and have the duty of telling their families that they have killed themselves."

Having already spent £500,000 on a number of safety measures (including reducing the speed limit, installing high-friction surfacing, barriers and signs, widening the carriageway and using mobile speed cameras), in January 2009 it was revealed that Cheshire Council, on behalf of Cheshire Safer Roads Partnership and Derbyshire Partnership for Road Safety, intended to spend a further £1.2 million on installing average-speed cameras along this road. Installation of these cameras began in February 2010. However, the initial operation of the cameras did not go smoothly, because along the full route of the cameras' operation there are a number of shortcuts which have the full national speed (60 mph) and decrease the overall distance of the route. These two factors, when combined, can give inaccurate readings from the speed cameras. The average-speed camera scheme is a joint initiative between the Cheshire Safer Roads Partnership (including Cheshire East Council), Lee Murphy, Cheshire Safer Roads Partnership manager, said: "Major resources have been committed to the Cat and Fiddle road since 2000, including reducing the speed limit, high-friction surfacing, high-visibility warning signs, red warnings painted on the road, motorcycle-friendly safety barriers, enforcement signs, carriageway widening, mobile safety cameras and police operations. Even without police costs, we estimate that more than £500,000 has been spent on the road in Cheshire alone. Despite all this work, casualties remain high."

Of the 264 casualties on the road since 2001, approximately 70% of those killed or seriously injured were motorcyclists, the main causes being poor cornering/manoeuvring, exceeding the speed limit and failing to judge another vehicle’s speed/distance. "The information and statistics show that it is riding behaviour not the road condition that causes the majority of collisions. We don’t have a problem with other road users not seeing bikes, because the majority of collisions are single vehicles," added Murphy.

The Cat and Fiddle again topped the list in the 2010 report, which claimed that fatalities on the road rose from 15 in the three years to 2005 to 34 between 2006 and 2008. However, following the introduction of further safety measures including improved road barriers, a 50mph speed limit and the installation of average speed cameras, the road dropped out of the Foundation's top ten list in 2015.

== See also ==
- Cat and Fiddle Inn
