= Magistrate of Brussels =

Unfinished oil painting or sketch by Anthony van Dyck

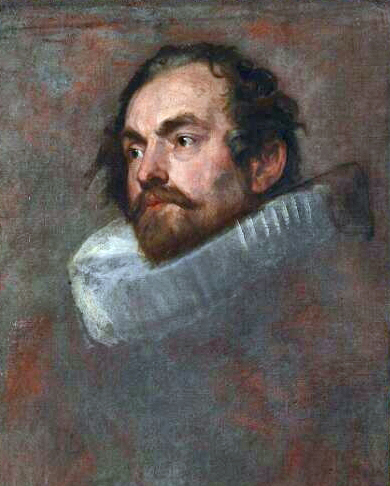
- The restored painting
- Artist: Anthony van Dyck
- Year: Circa 1634
- Medium: Oil on canvas
- Owner: Father Jamie MacLeod

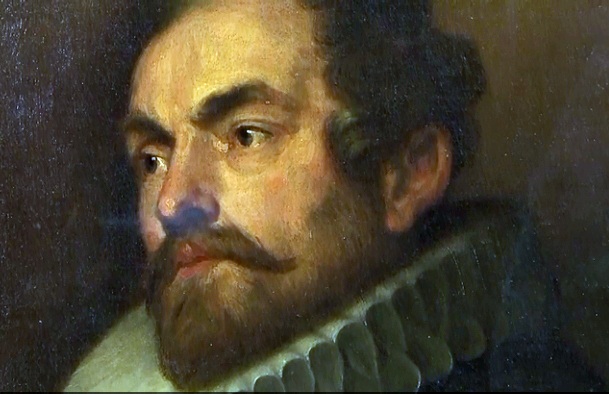
Close-up of part of the work, before restoration.

Magistrate of Brussels is an unfinished oil painting or oil sketch by Anthony van Dyck, rediscovered in 2013 after being shown on episodes of the BBC television programme Antiques Roadshow.

The work was purchased for £400 from a Nantwich, Cheshire, antiques shop some years previously by Father Jamie MacLeod and hung in the Whaley Hall Ecumenical Retreat House, which he runs, at Whaley Bridge. At one point, it fell from the wall there, smashing a CD player, but sustained no significant damage. The frame was labelled "Sir A van Dyck", but the picture was thought to be a copy. He took the painting to a recording of Antiques Roadshow at Newstead Abbey, Nottinghamshire, in 2012.

MacLeod then took it to a second recording, at the Royal Agricultural University, Cirencester. There, it was recognised as potentially a van Dyck by presenter Fiona Bruce, who had been working with art historian Philip Mould on an episode of another BBC programme (Fake or Fortune?), which recently featured works by van Dyck. Mould shared her suspicions and suggested that the work be treated by an expert restorer, in what he described as "the art equivalent of an [archaeological] excavation". The painting was restored by Simon Gillespie, who used solvent to remove layers of overpainting, in a process that took the equivalent of three weeks of full-time work. The removal of later painting returned what had appeared to be a finished portrait into a sketch with unfinished details. The ruff in particular was shown only in outline. The work was then confirmed as van Dyck's by Christopher Brown, a noted authority on the painter.

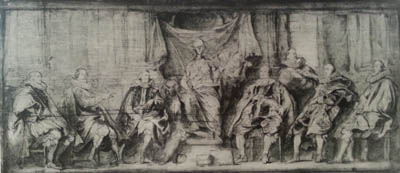
Grisaille sketch of Magistrates of Brussels, in the Ecole Nationale Superieure des Beaux-Arts in Paris

Mould thought that the painting was probably a preparatory sketch for Van Dyck's 1634 work Magistrates of Brussels, which was destroyed in the Bombardment of Brussels in 1695. Its composition is known from a grisaille sketch, in the Ecole Nationale Superieure des Beaux-Arts in Paris, which van Dyck prepared to show how he planned to lay out the piece. Another three sketches of magistrates' heads for the same work, with the same red background as MacLeod's painting, are known to exist: two in the Ashmolean Museum at Oxford, and a third which was sold to an unknown buyer. A further work, in the Royal Collection, may also be from the same series. Mould pointed out that the pose of the MacLeod portrait matched that of the rightmost individual in the grisaille sketch.

Mould valued the sketch at between £300,000 and £400,000, making it the most valuable painting identified in the 36-year history of the programme. MacLeod announced his intention to sell it and to use the money to buy church bells, in commemoration of the centenary of the start of the First World War. In May 2014, it was announced that the work would be auctioned at Christie's on 8 July. Still, it failed to sell on that occasion. It was later sold to a private collector. In 2015, the painting was on loan to the Rubenshuis, and in 2016 it was exhibited at the Frick Collection in New York. As of September 2018, it remained a part of the Rubenshuis exhibition.

== See also ==
- List of paintings by Anthony van Dyck
