= Magistrates of Brussels =

Painting by Anthony van Dyck

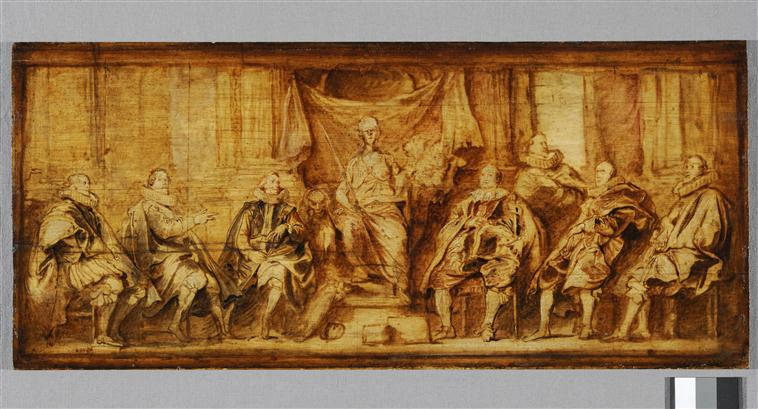
Grisaille sketch of Magistrates of Brussels, in the École nationale supérieure des Beaux-Arts in Paris

Magistrates of Brussels was a 1634–35 oil painting by Anthony van Dyck. It was destroyed in the French bombardment of Brussels in 1695. Its composition is known from a grisaille sketch in the École nationale supérieure des Beaux-Arts in Paris, which Van Dyck prepared to show how he planned to lay out the work.

Van Dyck was paid 2,400 florins for the painting in 1628, intended for Brussels Town Hall. It was painted in a period when Van Dyck had returned to the Netherlands. The work was completed in 1634-5 and included portraits of seven magistrates in council, around a statue representing Justice.

At least four sketches of magistrates' heads for the same work are known to exist, each with a distinctive pink background. Two are in the Ashmolean Museum at Oxford. A third was in the collection of the Saint Louis Art Museum from 1952 to 2010, and later sold to a private collector. A fourth (Magistrate of Brussels) was rediscovered in England in 2013. A further work in the Royal Collection may also be from the same series.

== See also ==
- List of paintings by Anthony van Dyck
