= Chapel Town F.C. =

Association football club in England

Chapel Town
- Full name: Chapel Town Football Club
- Founded: 1921
- League: Hope Valley Amateur League Premier Division
- 2025–26: Hope Valley Amateur League Premier Division, 4th of 8
- Website: http://www.clubwebsite.co.uk/chapeltownfc/

Chapel Town F.C. is an English association football club based in Chapel-en-le-Frith, Derbyshire. The club plays in the Hope Valley Amateur League Premier Division.

== History ==
The club has competed in the FA Amateur Cup. The club won the Manchester Football League Division One in 2007–08 and 2013–14.

== Controversy ==
The convicted criminal Marcus Smith was allowed to play for the club prior to him being shot whilst terrorising a local homeowner. The CPS confirmed the homeowner was entitled to defend his home in such a manner.

== Honours ==
- Manchester Football League Division One
  - Champions 2007–08, 2013–14
