= Philip Marchington =

Member of the Nova Scotia House of Assembly from Cumberland County
- In office 1786–1793

Personal details
- Born: October 28, 1736 Chapel-en-le-Frith, Derbyshire, England
- Died: November 2, 1808 (aged 72) Halifax, Nova Scotia

Philip Marchington (October 28, 1736 – November 2, 1808) was a British-Canadian merchant and political figure in Nova Scotia. He represented Cumberland County in the Nova Scotia House of Assembly from 1786 to 1793.

== Early life ==
Marchington was born in Chapel-en-le-Frith in the High Peak district of Derbyshire, England. Philip was baptized on October 28, 1736, by Dr. James Clegg of Chinley Independent Chapel.

== Career ==
He was a United Empire Loyalist from Pennsylvania who came to Halifax in 1784. A leader of the Methodist church in the province, he built a church on his property. Marchington was elected to the provincial assembly after Christopher Harper was unseated because he was not a resident of Nova Scotia.

== Death ==
He died in Halifax in 1808, at the age of 72.
