= High Peak Radio =

Historical radio station in Peak District, Derbyshire

Coordinates: 53.32458°N 1.90868°W

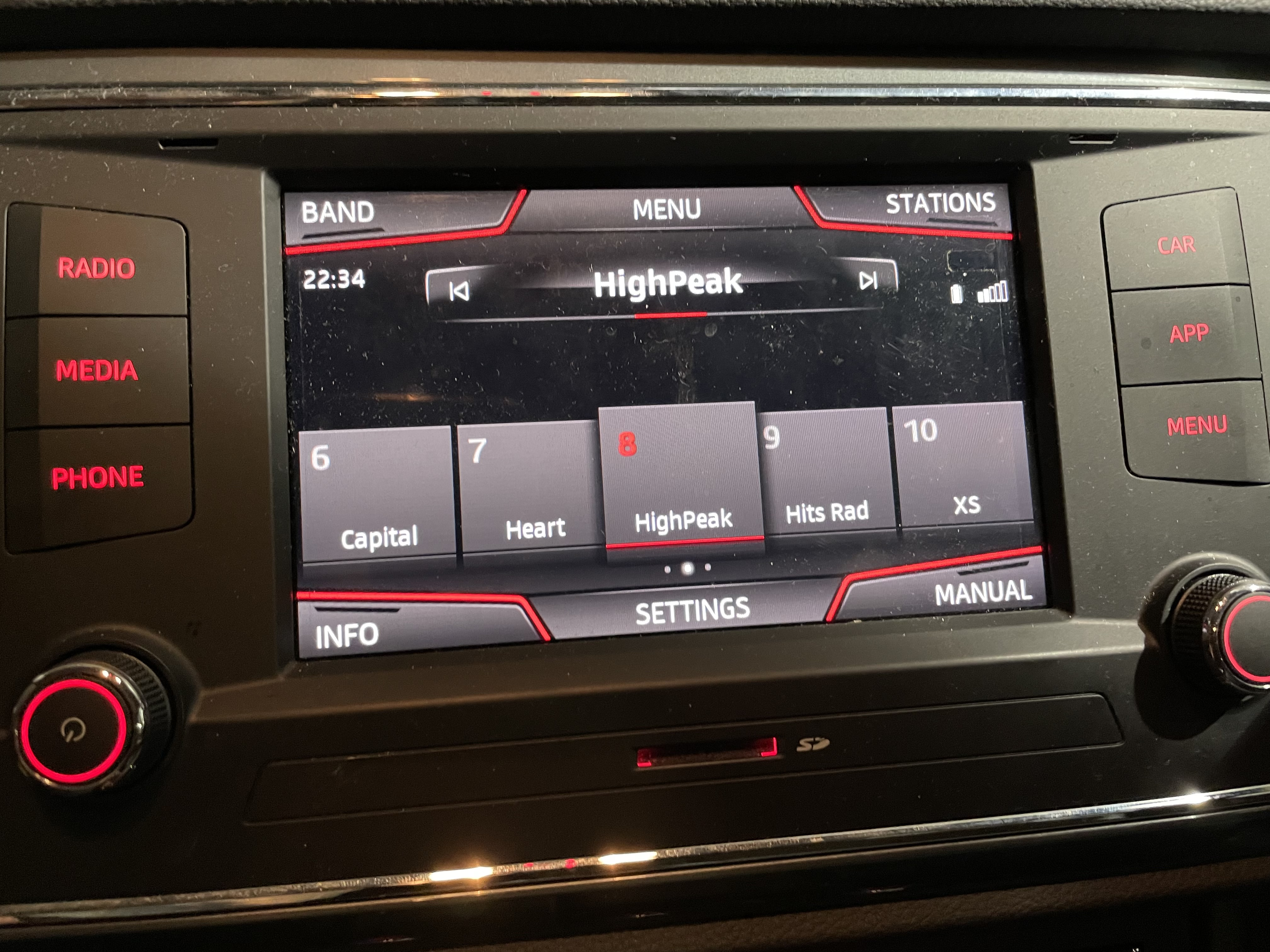
- Radio Data System display showing "HighPeak" (photo taken 2019)
- Chapel-en-le-Frith; England
- Broadcast area: Peak District
- Frequencies: 103.3 FM; 106.4 FM; 106.6 FM
- RDS: HIGHPEAK

Programming
- Format: Adult contemporary

Ownership
- Owner: Helius Media Group

History
- First air date: 4 April 2004
- Last air date: 4 November 2019

Links
- Website: www.highpeakradio.co.uk and www.ashbourneradio.co.uk

High Peak Radio was an Independent Local Radio station broadcasting to the Peak District, Derbyshire, from studios in Chapel-en-le-Frith. It broadcast on 106.4 (Buxton & Glossop), 103.3 (Buxworth & Hope Valley), and 106.6 FM (Chapel-en-le-Frith).

Its sister station, Ashbourne Radio, broadcast from Ashbourne on 96.7 FM (Ashbourne) and 101.8 FM (Wirksworth & Uttoxeter). On 4 November 2019, both stations relaunched as Imagine Radio, sharing off-peak programming with their sister station in Stockport.

In June 2021, Bauer Media announced that they were buying the Imagine Radio stations from the Like Media Group, which would be merged into the Greatest Hits Radio network on 1 September 2021.

Several former High Peak Radio presenters joined a competing online station called Peak Sound Radio, formed after the closure of the Imagine stations.
