= Buxton Road Bridge =

Railway bridge in Derbyshire, England

Coordinates: 53°19′38.38″N 1°59′3.11″W

Buxton Road Bridge is a railway bridge over the A5004 road in Whaley Bridge, in the High Peak district, in the county of Derbyshire, England. It carries the Buxton line.

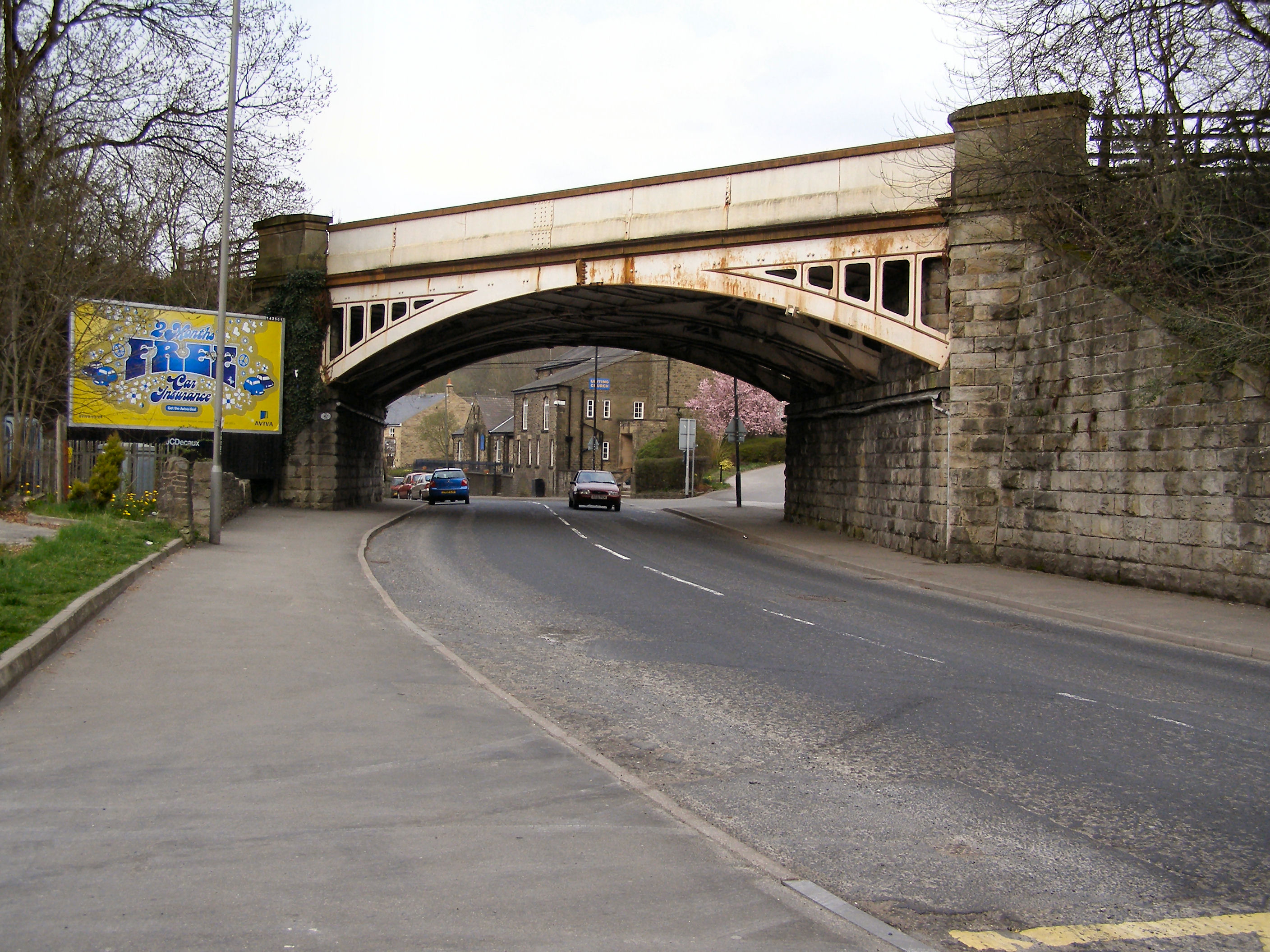

== History ==
The bridge was built in 1863. The structure became a Grade II listed building on 19 June 1998.

In 2002, Railtrack became aware of a crack in one of the outer iron spans of the bridge. Restrictions on rail traffic passing over the bridge were put in place, including a 25 miles per hour (40 kilometres per hour) speed restriction for freight trains and a ban on two freight trains passing each other on the bridge. In 2010, Network Rail applied for a Listed Building Consent to replace the bridge with a modern structure. The request was turned down the following year and a subsequent appeal was dismissed.

In November 2022, Network Rail applied again for permission to rebuild and modify the bridge.

Work to rebuild the bridge began in January 2023.
