= William Jauderell =

British archer in the 14th century

William Jauderell was an archer in the English armies in Wales of Edward, the Black Prince in the 14th century. He was from the town of Yeardsley in Derbyshire.

A descendant of Peter Jauderel, (Note: The name has changed over the years prior to the standardization of English spelling. It has gone from Jauderel to Jauderell to Joudrell, and eventually to Jodrell, which it has remained since the late 15th century. This article uses whatever name was used by the author of the relevant text to do with Jauderell or his family, and all names above are interchangeable in the context of the article.) a soldier who had helped King Edward conquer Wales in the late 13th century, William Jauderell held estates in Cheshire and Macclesfield Forest registered in 1351. His son Roger Joudrell would later fight at the Battle of Agincourt in 1415, and was buried in the church of St James, Taxal, also in Derbyshire, where his grave is marked by a large plaque honouring William and others from the family.

On 16 December 1355, Prince Edward gave Jauderell leave to travel to England by means of a safe passage pass that his family keeps as an heirloom today. The translated modern text reads "Know all that we, the Prince of Wales, have given leave on the day of the date of this instrument, to William Jauderel, one of our archers, to go to England. In witness of this we have caused our seal to be placed on this bill. Given at Bordeaux 16 December, in the year of grace 1355."

After travelling to England, Jauderell went back overseas, presumably to France where the Battle of Poitiers took place in September 1356, and was recorded returning to England in 1356 when he was awarded two oak trees to repair his Derbyshire home, taken from Macclesfield Forest.

Jauderell's name lives on in the name of Cheshire's Jodrell Bank Observatory.

== See also ==
- Jodrell Bank
