= Chapel-en-le-Frith Town Hall =

Municipal building in Chapel-en-le-Frith, Derbyshire, England

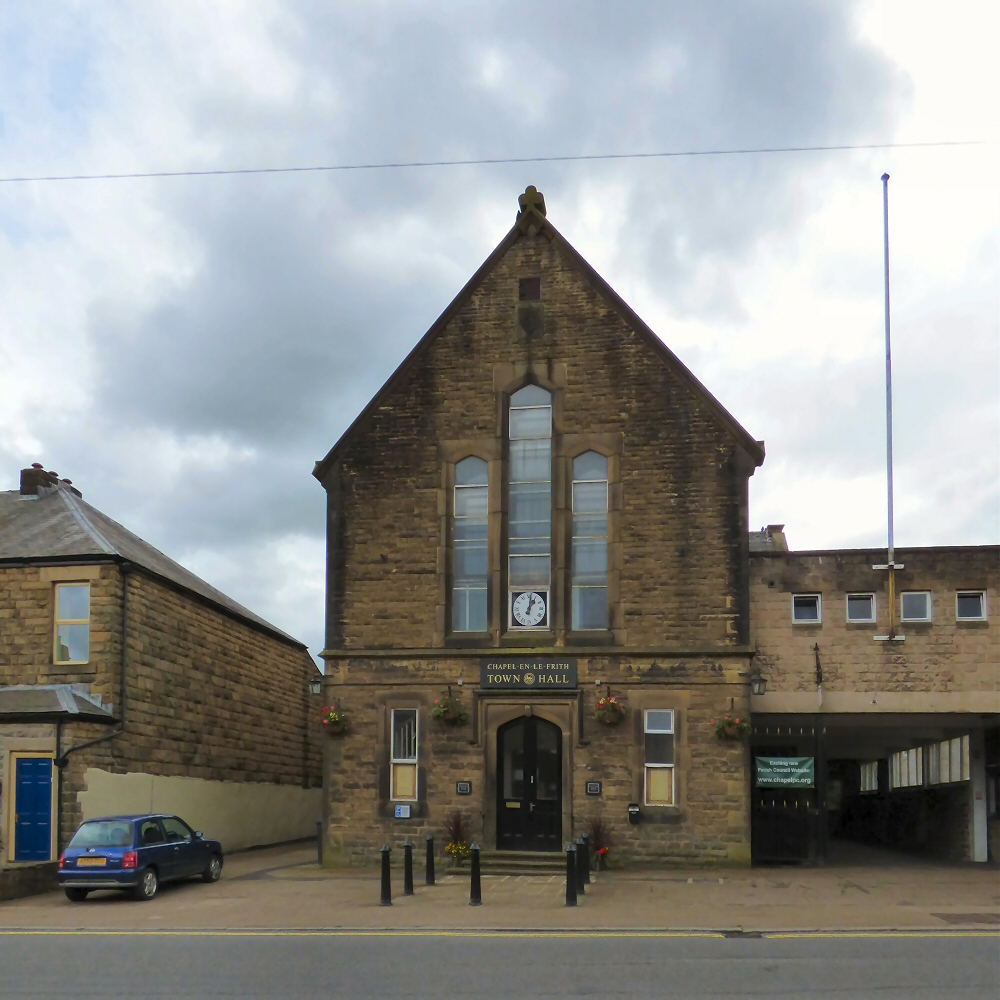
- Chapel-en-le-Frith Town Hall

- Shown in Derbyshire
- 53.3238°N 1.9131°W
- Location: Market Street, Chapel-en-le-Frith

History
- Built: 1851

Site notes
- Architectural style: Gothic Revival style

Chapel-en-le-Frith Town Hall is a municipal building in Market Street, Chapel-en-le-Frith, Derbyshire, England. The structure operates as a community events venue, as well as the offices and meeting place of Chapel-en-le-Frith Parish Council.

== History ==
The building was commissioned by a medical doctor, Thomas Slacke, who lived at Bowden Hall, as dedicated accommodation for the local magistrates, who had previously held their hearings in the Old Oak Inn. The site he selected was on the southeast side of Market Street. Slack retained ownership of the building but assigned all rentals for the benefit of local schools.

The building was designed in the Gothic Revival style, built in rubble masonry at a cost of £2,000, and was opened as the "New Sessions House" in 1851. The design involved a symmetrical main frontage of three bays facing onto Market Street. The central bay contained a segmental headed doorway with an architrave and a keystone. It was flanked, in the outer bays, by two narrow casement windows. On the first floor there were three tall lancet windows with the central window placed higher than the others to allow the installation of a clock. The there was a high gable above surmounted by a trefoil-shaped finial. Internally, the principal rooms were the main hall on the first floor, which featured a vaulted timber roof, and the courtroom behind.

County court hearings as well as monthly petty sessions were held in the building, which was enlarged in 1882. After judicial hearings in the town hall were discontinued, the courtroom was later converted for use as a library. Ownership of the building was transferred to the parish council in 1928.

After the Second World War, proposals were developed to expand the building, as a lasting memorial to local service personnel who had died in the war. In the event, civic leaders decided to create an annex extending to the southwest of the exiting structure. The annex, which created a new room on the first floor, adjacent to the main hall and fenestrated by four square casement windows, was completed in 1970. Meanwhile, the building continued to serve as the offices and meeting place of Chapel-en-le-Frith Parish Council, as well as a local venue for public meetings, and community events.

Works of art in the town hall include eleven landscape paintings by Neil Bennett depicting the town and surrounding villages, as well as a series of paintings by Norman Phillips depicting local scenes.
