= Furness Vale Rovers F.C. =

Furness Vale Rovers
- Full name: Furness Vale Rovers Football Club
- Nickname(s): the Rovers, the Furnessmen
- Founded: 1882
- Dissolved: 1888
- Ground: Bothones Hill
- Secretary: John Taylor
Home colours

Furness Vale Rovers F.C. was a short-lived association football club from the village of Furness Vale in the High Peak, at the time in the county of Cheshire. The club is notable for coming from the smallest place to have a side featured in the main draw of the FA Cup.

== History ==
The club's first reported match was against Buxton in November 1882. The club took over the Furness Vale club in 1883 and were "now able to place a very strong side in the field". In 1884–85, the club entered the Cheshire Challenge Cup, beating the Tranmere club 1–0 in the first round, but losing in the second to Oughtrington Park F.C.

Club captain John Murray was selected in January 1886 as a reserve for the Cheshire Football Association representative side in a match against the Derbyshire Football Association.

In 1886–87, the club entered the FA Cup; this was a highly optimistic move, as the Rovers had not made any impact in the local competitions, and was not on the friendlies schedule of any of the large local clubs, although on 28 November 1885 the club had lost 2–0 at Newton Heath LYR, who would become Manchester United. Nevertheless, entering the Cup did give the club a "glamour" fixture, against perennial Cheshire champions Northwich Victoria. The club lost 10–0 but had the consolation of playing before a large crowd. The club's true status was shown by a second round exit in the Cheshire Cup to a club from the village of Rainow; the club protested to no avail.

The club's final reported fixture was against Hurst New Mills in February 1887. There is no record of the club playing in the 1887–88 season or afterwards, although it still seems to have been a member of the FA for 1887–88.

== Colours ==
The club's colours were black and scarlet.

== Ground ==
The Rovers moved to a new ground in the 1885–86 season, but none of the newspapers report on its, or the previous ground's, location; given the size of Furness Vale (with a population of less than 1,000), giving the fixture location as simply "Furness Vale" was enough. The 1885 Charles Alcock annual gives the location as adjoining "150 Bothones Hill".
