= Oil sketch =

Preparatory study for a full painting

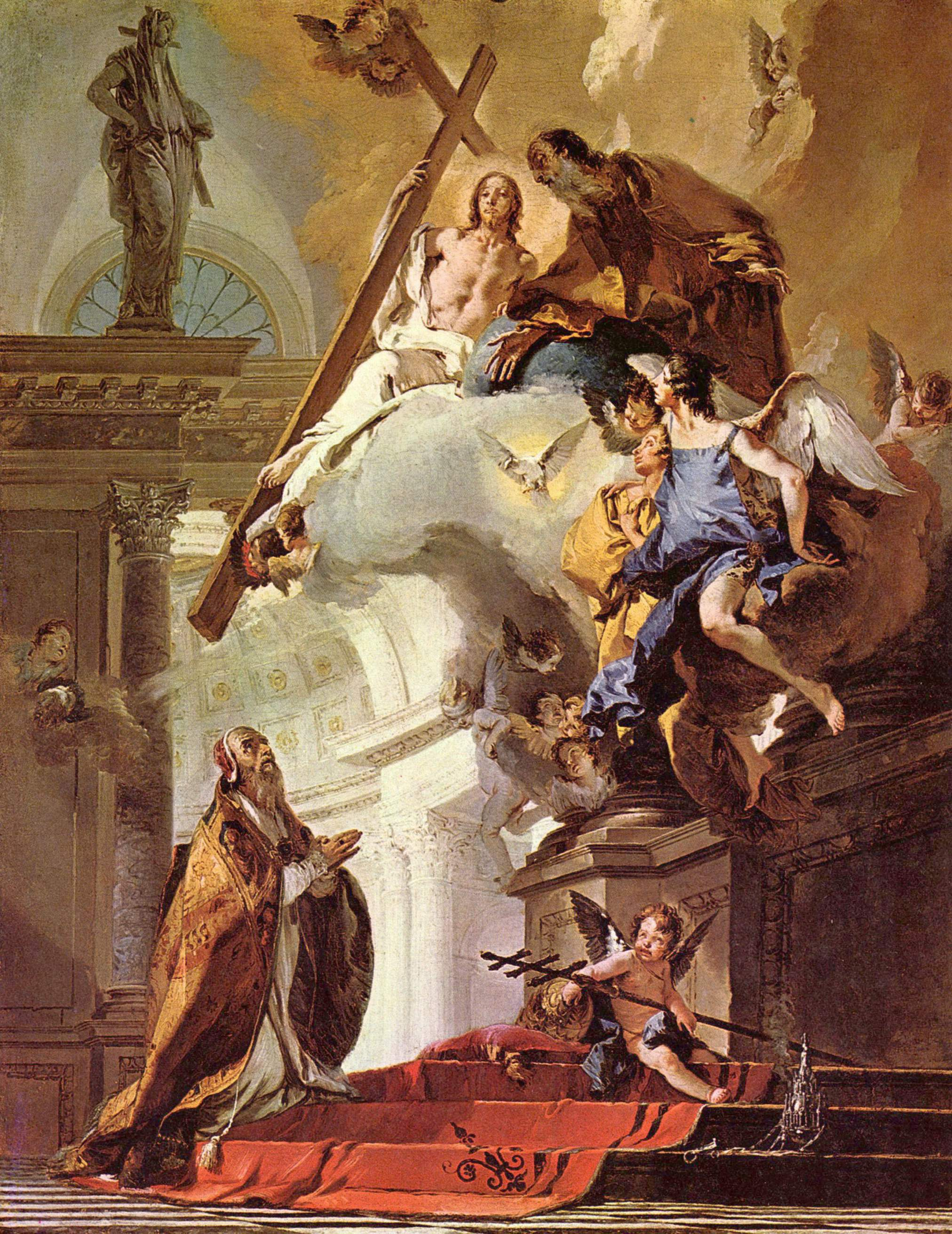
Oil sketch modello by Tiepolo, 69 × 55 cm

An oil sketch or oil study is an artwork made primarily in oil paint in preparation for a larger, finished work. Originally these were created as preparatory studies or modelli, especially so as to gain approval for the design of a larger commissioned painting. They were also used as designs for specialists in other media, such as printmaking or tapestry, to follow. Later they were produced as independent works, often with no thought of being expanded into a full-size painting.

The usual medium for modelli was the drawing, but an oil sketch, even if done in a limited range of colours, could better suggest the tone of the projected work. It is also possible to more fully convey the flow and energy of a composition in paint. For a painter with exceptional technique, the production of an oil sketch may be as rapid as that of a drawing, and many practitioners had superb brush skills. In its rapidity of execution the oil sketch may be used not only to express movement and transient effects of light and color, its gestural nature may even represent a mimetic parallel to the action of the subject.

== History ==
One of the earliest artists to produce oil sketches was Polidoro da Caravaggio, a fine draftsman and pupil of Raphael, but not one who had passed through the traditional Florentine training, with its emphasis on drawing. His are all apparently related to works later done on a larger scale, and are themselves relatively large and on panel, with examples in the National Gallery, London and Courtauld Institute of Art being 75 and 65 cm tall respectively. Sometimes a number of sketches for the same composition have survived.

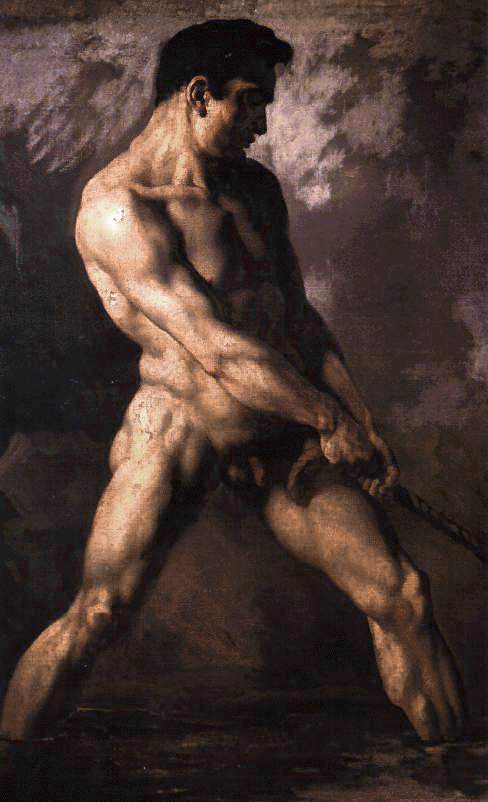
Oil study of a male nude by Géricault

In the early 17th century the oil sketch became widely used, as it was suited to conveying the drama of Baroque art. Rubens made great use of them, as working studies, and as modelli for clients, his own assistants, engravers and tapestry-makers. Their degree of finish varies accordingly. Rubens' working practices influenced others, such as Anthony van Dyck, who did not normally use oil sketches for the portraits that were the bulk of his output, but did for his print series the Iconographie, and for other works such as a projected series of tapestries and some religious paintings. The Magistrate of Brussels, recognised in England in 2013, may be a Van Dyck portrait oil sketch.

Perhaps the first to produce oil sketches as independent works was Giovanni Benedetto Castiglione, an amazingly fecund generator of compositions on a relatively small range of subjects. He grew up and trained in Genoa, and apparently had contact with both Rubens and Van Dyck during their stays there. He produced a large number of small works, mostly on paper, in a mixture of mediums - drawings or gouaches finished in oil, oils with pen details - in fact, most possible permutations. Detail is typically restricted to a few key points, with much of the subject conveyed in impressionistic fashion. By this time a collectors' market for studies in drawing was well developed, and there was appreciation of their energy and freedom. Castiglione's sketches to some extent seem to trade off this appreciation, and look more unfinished and offhand than they actually are - a concept with a great future.

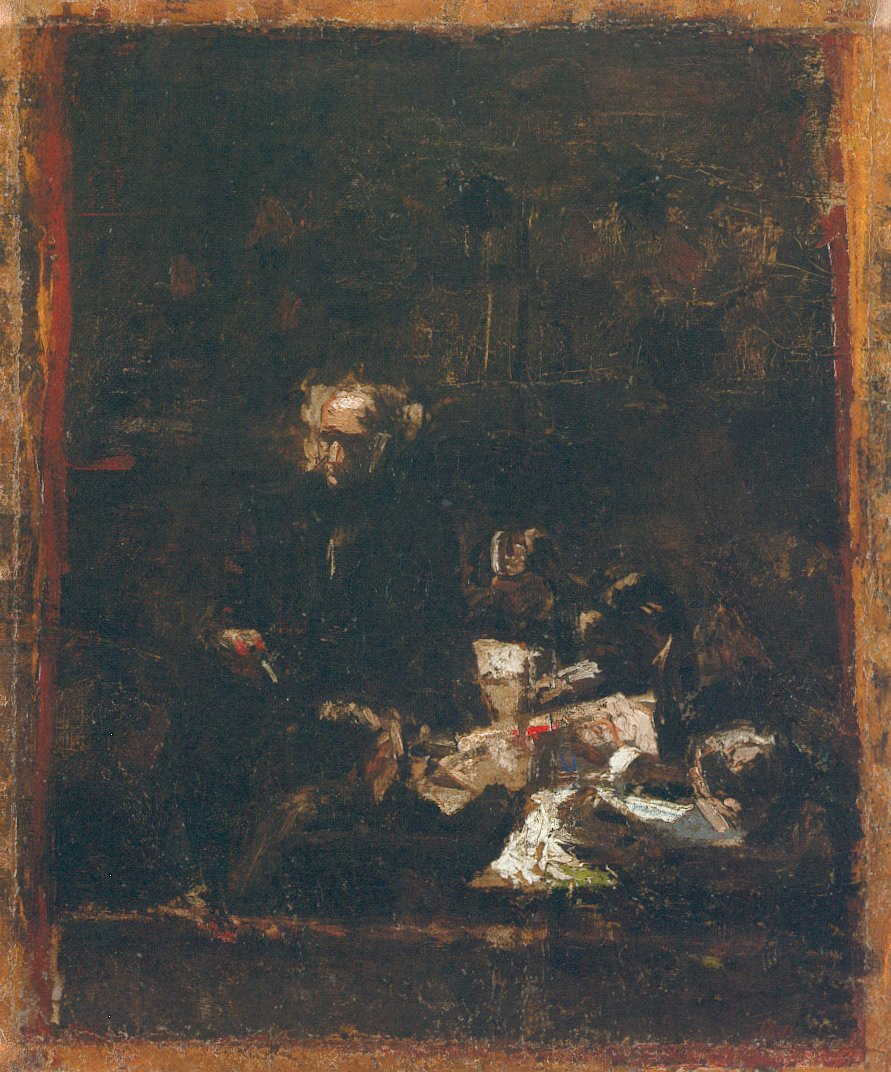
Thomas Eakins, Sketch for The Gross Clinic.

A systematic producer of small modelli sketches on canvas with a high degree of finish was the 18th century Venetian Giovanni Battista Tiepolo, whose superb technique is often shown at its best in reducing a huge altarpiece to a lively but precise rendering at this small scale. At roughly the same time Jean Fragonard was producing a series of virtuosic Figures de fantaisie, half-length portraits of imaginary subjects, purporting to have been painted in an hour.

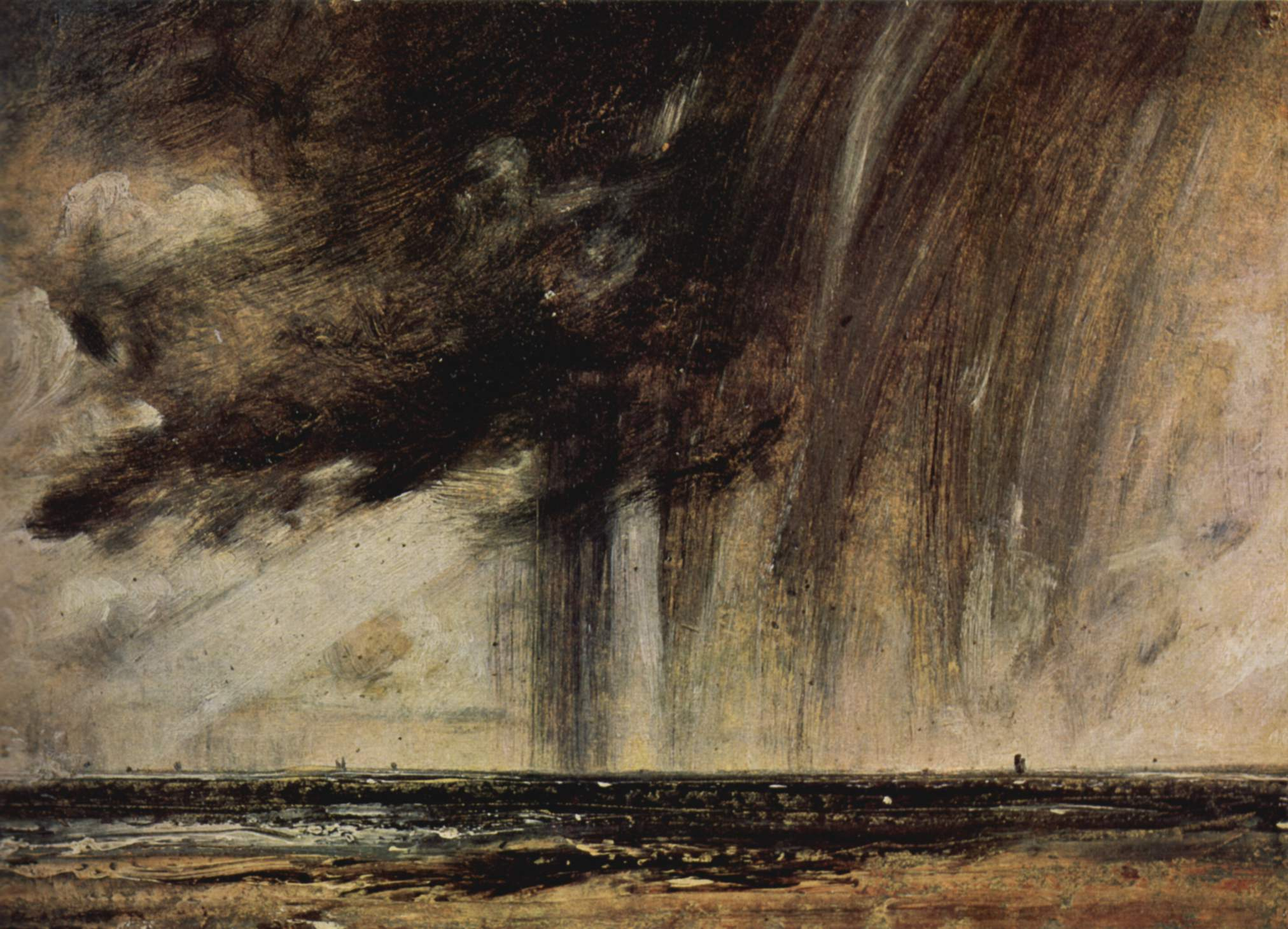
John Constable, 1827, 22 × 31 cm

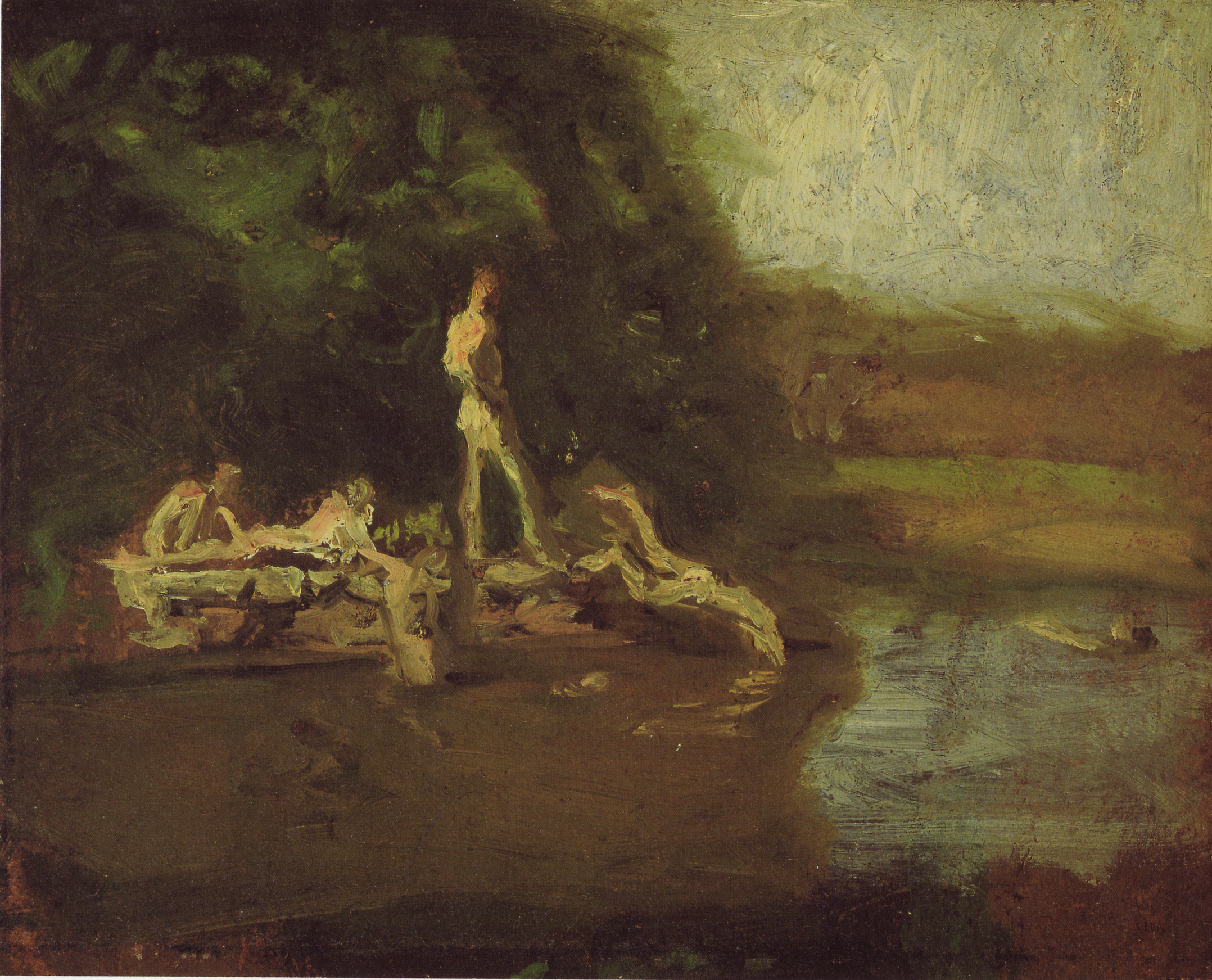
Thomas Eakins, 1884 Swimming Hole sketch, oil on fiberboard mounted on fiberboard, 22.1 × 27 cm., 8 3/4 × 10 3/4 inches, Hirshhorn Museum and Sculpture Garden, Washington, D.C..

By the 19th century oil sketches, often referred to as "oil studies" if from this period, had become very common, both as preparatory works, and for their own sake. The popularity of the oil sketch engendered the need to formulate distinctions. The esquisse, or oil sketch, tended to be inspirational or imaginative, often originating in literature or art; the etude, or study, tended to represent an observation of nature, painted from life. In academic painting the oil sketch took the form of the croquis, a small and gestural compositional study, and the ébauche, a dynamic laying-in of paint on the full-scale canvas, a temporary stage of the painting eventually leading to greater elaboration.

John Constable made extensive use of sketches for his landscapes, both of intimate scale, often in a sketchbook on paper, and in full-scale sketches for his largest "six-footers", which he used to refine his compositions. Delacroix, Géricault, Manet and Degas are other artists who often used them. For some oil sketches Degas painted in essence, a technique by which the oil had been all but removed from the pigment, so that the artist was virtually drawing with pure paint. Seurat made many careful small oil sketches for his larger works. However, with the advent of Impressionism, and then Modernism, the practice of preparatory drawing and painting tended to decline. The abandonment by many artists of a high level of detail and finish in favor of a more painterly and spontaneous approach, reduced the distinction between a detailed sketch and a finished painting. Sketches by Rubens or Tiepolo, for example, are at least as highly finished as many 20th century oil paintings. Many artists, especially those working in more traditional styles, still use oil sketches today. Francis Bacon is an example of an artist who called many of his most important, and largest, finished works "studies": examples are his Three Studies for Figures at the Base of a Crucifixion Tate Britain, or his Study from Pope Innocent X, auctioned in 2007 for $52.7 million.

== See also ==
- Oil painting
