= Chapel-en-le-Frith =

Town in Derbyshire, England

Coordinates: 53.322°N 1.917°W

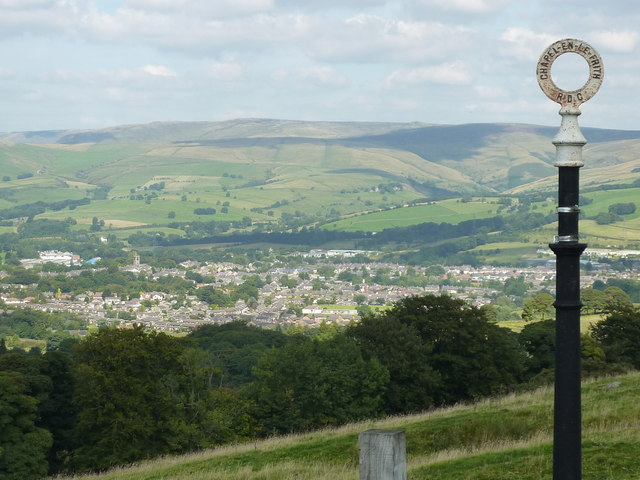
- View of the town from Cowlow Lane

- Chapel-en-le-Frith parish highlighted within Derbyshire
- Population: 8,635 (Parish, 2011)
- OS grid reference: SK055806
- Civil parish: Chapel-en-le-Frith
- District: High Peak
- Shire county: Derbyshire
- Region: East Midlands
- Country: England
- Sovereign state: United Kingdom
- Post town: HIGH PEAK
- Postcode district: SK23
- Dialling code: 01298
- Police: Derbyshire
- Fire: Derbyshire
- Ambulance: East Midlands
- UK Parliament: High Peak

Chapel-en-le-Frith (/ˌtʃæpəl ˌɒn lə ˈfrɪθ/) is a town and civil parish, in the Borough of High Peak, Derbyshire, England.

It has been dubbed the "Capital of the Peak", in reference to the Peak District, historically the highland areas between the Saxon lands (south of the River Trent) and the Viking lands (which came as far south as Dore, South Yorkshire).

== History ==
The town was established by the Normans in the 12th century, originally as a hunting lodge within the Forest of High Peak. This led to the Anglo-Norman-derived name Chapel-en-le-Frith ("chapel in the forest"). (It appears in a Middle English form in a Latin record as Chapell in the ffryth, in 1401.) The population at the 2011 census was 8,635.

=== Church of St Thomas Becket ===
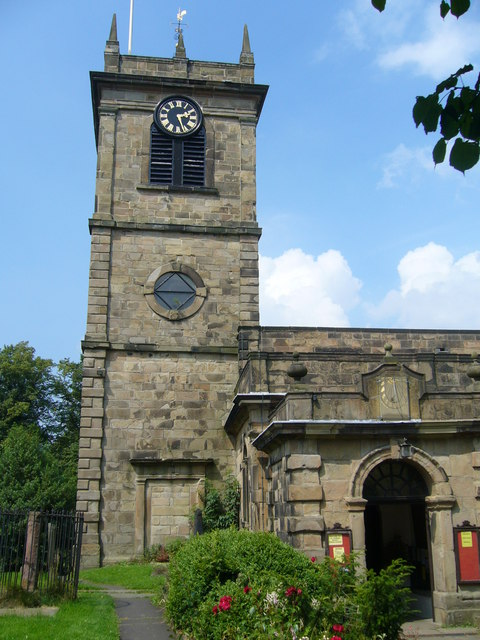
Church of Thomas Becket

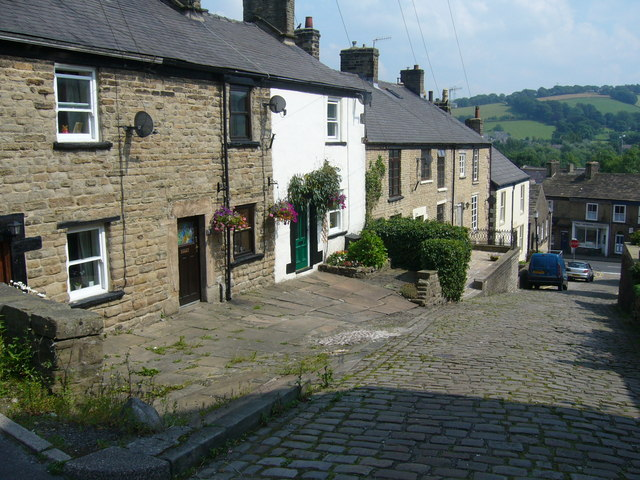
Church Brow in the town centre

The first chapel in the town (now the Church of St. Thomas Becket) was built originally by the Normans, but was replaced with a larger building a hundred years later. It stands at the highest point in the town proper. The current building is now almost entirely of 18th-century construction above a crypt of 1225.

Buried in the churchyard are soldiers of the Scottish army of the Duke of Hamilton who marched south in support of Charles I in 1648. After their defeat at Preston, they were marched to Chapel and imprisoned in the church for sixteen days in such squalid conditions that forty died; a further ten died when they were marched towards Cheshire. The Eccles Pike Cross stands in the churchyard, having been moved here from Ollerenshaw Farm in 1925. It is believed to be Anglo-Saxon and is covered in very worn carvings.

=== John Wesley ===
John Wesley visited four times between 1740 and 1786. His journal documents his first visit on 28 May 1745 preaching in the hamlet of Chapel Milton, where the miller purportedly tried to drown him out with the sound of the watermill. On his following visit twenty years later, he preached in a field at Townend, and by his subsequent visit on 1 April 1782 a chapel had been built. All that remains of the original chapel is an archway inscribed "1780" at the back of the current Townend Methodist Church.

Following an illness in 1748, Wesley was nursed by Grace Murray, a class leader and housekeeper at an orphan house in Newcastle. Taken with Grace, he invited her to travel with him to Ireland in 1749, where he believed them to be betrothed though they were never married. It has been suggested that his brother Charles Wesley objected to the engagement though this is disputed. Subsequently, Grace married John Bennett, preacher and resident of Chapel-en-le-Frith, and John's last visit to Chapel-en-le-Frith on 3 April 1786 at age 86 was at Grace's request. Grace and John Bennett are buried in Chinley Independent Chapel in Chapel Milton.

== Geography ==
Although most of the area is outside the National Park boundary, the town is in the western part of the Peak District. To the north and south lie the Dark Peak highlands, which are made up of millstone grit and are heather-covered moorlands, rugged and bleak. These include Chinley Churn and South Head with, a little further off, Kinder Scout, which looms above the whole area. To the east is the gentler and more pastoral White Peak, consisting largely of limestone grasslands, nevertheless with spectacular bluffs and the occasional gorge. Combs Moss, a gritstone 'edge', dominates the valley in which Chapel lies from the south and Eccles Pike rises sharply above the town to its west and provides a commanding 360° viewpoint.

== Industry ==
The town has a strong industrial heritage, which continues today.

The brake-lining manufacturer Ferodo was a family concern for over a hundred years and was first established in the town; it is now part of the international conglomerate Federal-Mogul.

There are a number of other thriving businesses based in the town and adjacent areas, including scientific research companies Concept Life Sciences and Retrogenix as well as Rochling Fibracon Ltd and Kelsa Truck Ltd.

There is a regular market place, on the setts raised above the High Street, which is still used every Thursday to host the local market (though due to the current retail climate, the number of stalls present has declined considerably). A market cross has a faint date which may read 1636, but the cross itself is considerably older.

== Institutions ==
Chapel Poor Law Union was established in December 1837. The union workhouse was built c.1840 on the Whaley Bridge road (grid reference SK051805). It consisted of an entrance range and an accommodation block of three wings centred on an octagonal hub, an infirmary and an isolation hospital. The workhouse was later converted into an old people's home and was demolished in the early 1980s.

Greatest Hits Radio Derbyshire (High Peak), an independent local radio station for High Peak and the Hope Valley, previously broadcast as High Peak Radio from studios just off the High Street.

The town has its own theatre company, the Chapel Players, located just off Market Place.

== Transport ==
=== Railway ===
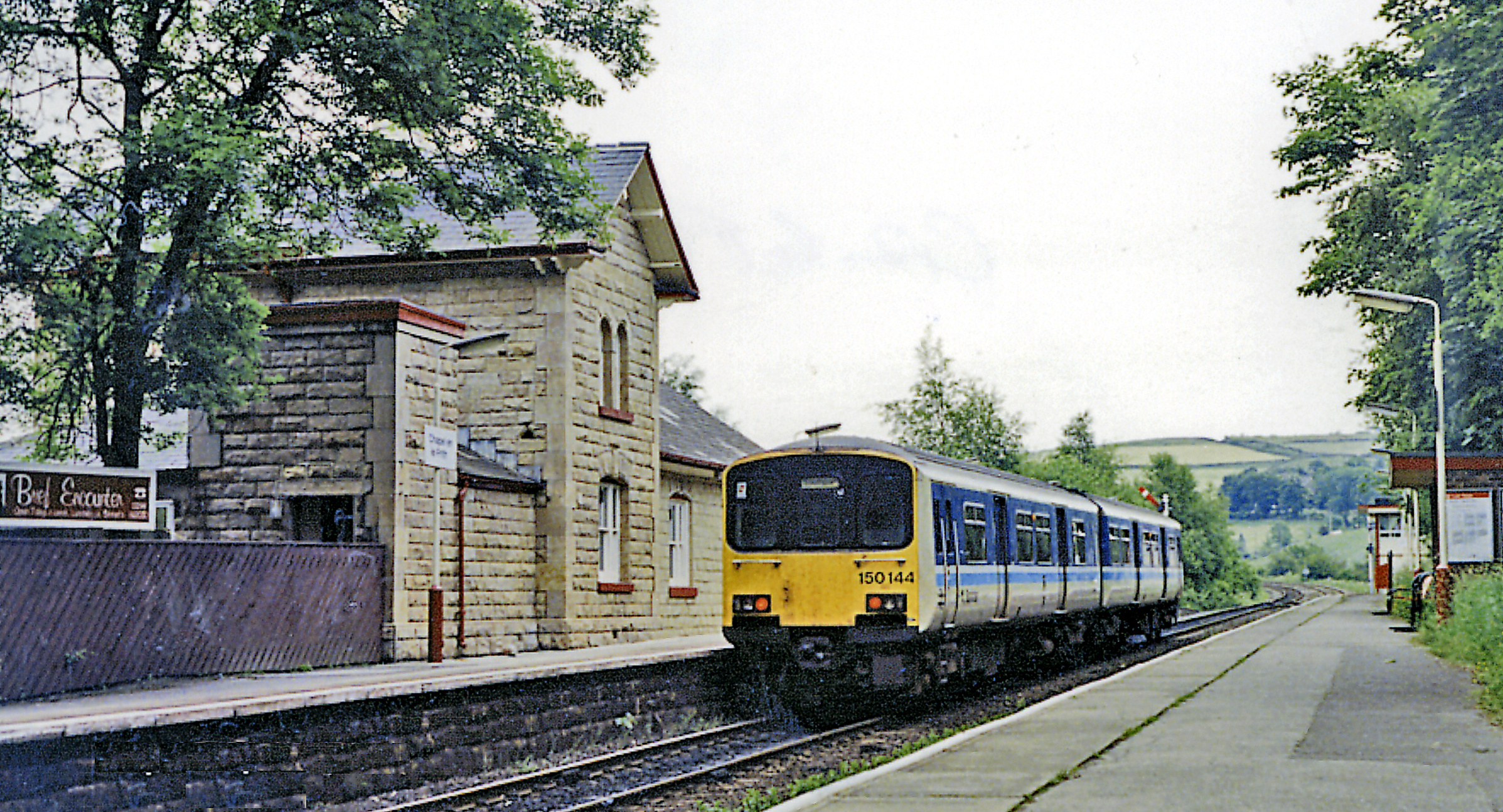
A train at Chapel-en-le-Frith station, on the Buxton line

Chapel-en-le-Frith station is located one mile (1.5 km) from the town centre, on the Buxton line between Buxton, Stockport and Manchester Piccadilly. The journey to Manchester takes 40–50 minutes; it is well-used as a commuter line for work and access to post-16 education.

The other railway line passing through the town was built by the Midland Railway, which was formerly a main line between London St Pancras and Manchester Central; Chapel-en-le-Frith Central railway station was opened on this line to serve the town. The line, and Central station, was closed to passenger traffic in 1967 and is now freight-only, carrying aggregate from the quarries around Buxton. It terminates at its junction with the Hope Valley Line, by way of Chapel Milton Viaduct, which diverges east and west above the Black Brook valley at Chapel Milton, near Chinley signalbox.

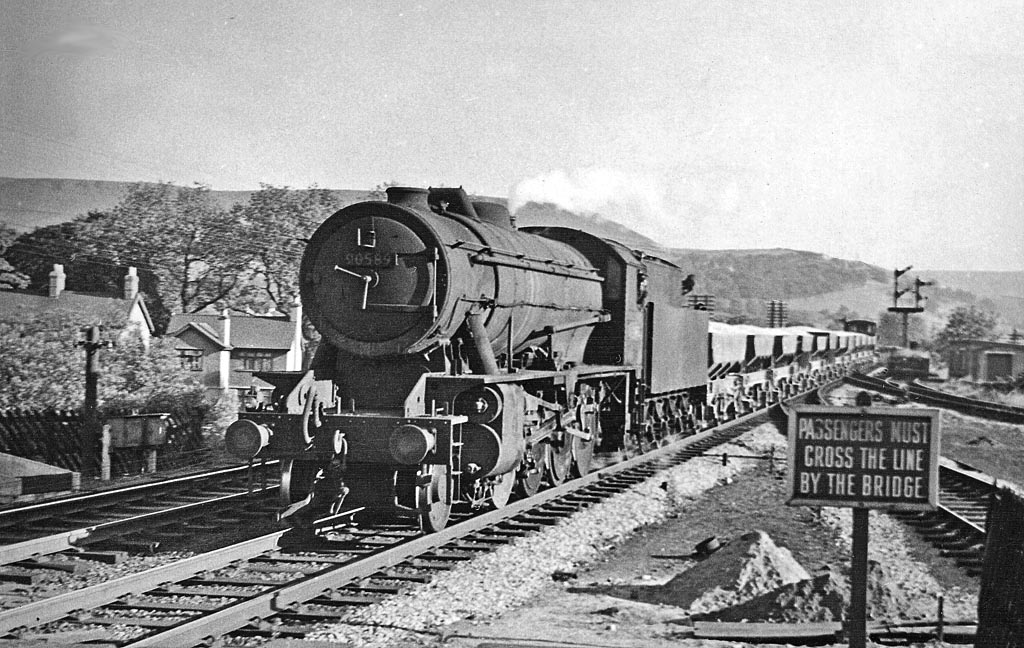
Locomotive approaching the former Chapel-en-le-Frith Central station in 1957

=== Buses ===
The town is also served by High Peak's 199 skyline service, which runs every 30 minutes between Buxton, Stockport and Manchester Airport.

== Sport ==
The town's football team is Chapel Town F.C., playing in Division One of the Manchester Football League. There is a golf course on the western edge of the town.

There is also a leisure centre, with tennis courts co-located with the High School which provides a range of fitness classes and sports facilities.

The town also has a cricket club on the southern end of the town.

== Education ==
The town has two schools: Chapel-en-le-Frith High School and Chapel-en-le-Frith Primary School.

== In popular culture ==
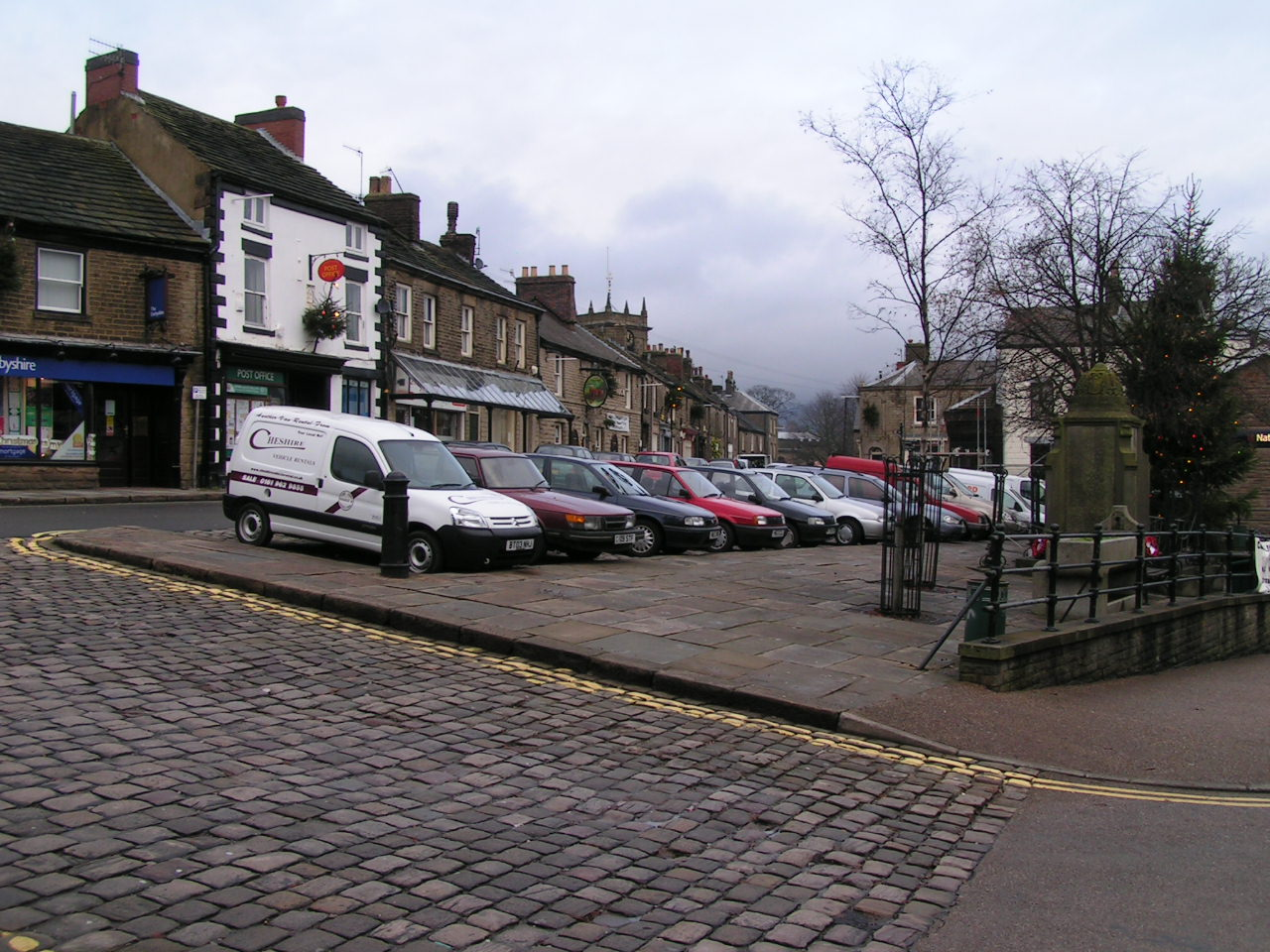
Market Square

Scenes from the BBC Television series The Village and The Secret of Crickley Hall were filmed in and around Chapel; Bowden Hall featured in both series. In 2015 Halfords made their Christmas advert around Rowton Grange Road in Chapel-en-le-Frith.

== Local media ==
Local news and television programmes are provided by BBC North West and ITV Granada. Television signals are received from the Winter Hill and the local relay transmitters.

The town's local radio stations are BBC Radio Manchester on 95.1 FM and Greatest Hits Radio Derbyshire (previously Imagine FM and High Peak Radio) on 106.6 FM.

Chapel-en-le-Frith is served by the local newspaper Buxton Advertiser.

== Landmarks of the parish ==
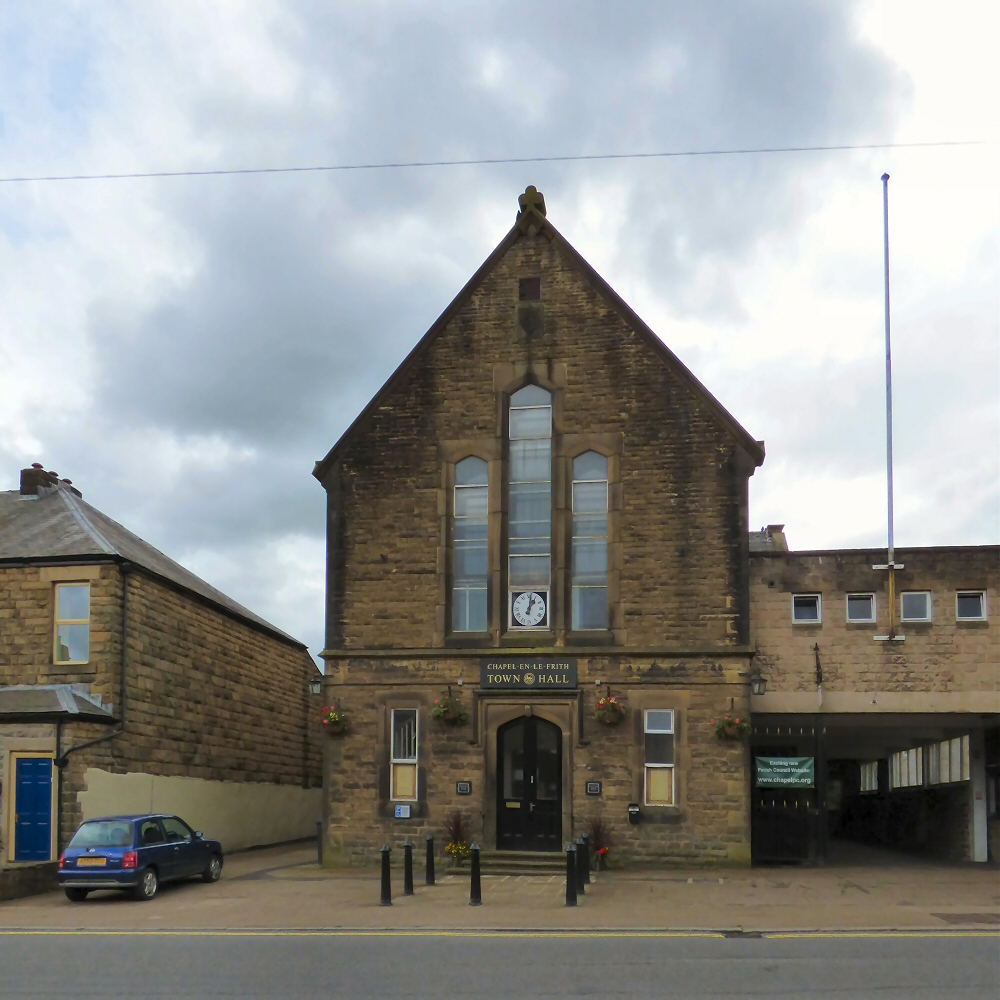
Chapel-en-le-Frith Town Hall

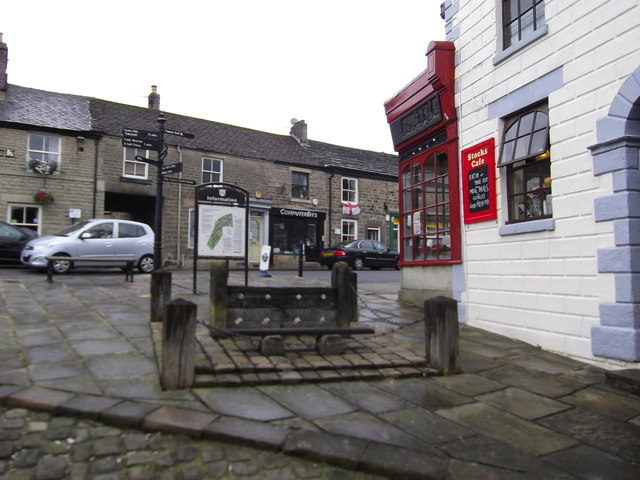
The town stocks on Chapel's Market Place

A square of cobbles adjacent to the stocks marks the spot where Will Scarlet, the legendary companion of Robin Hood, is said to have died on 14 December 1283. The 18th-century town stocks, for the punishment of petty crimes, still stand on the side of Chapel-en-le-Frith Market Place. Chapel-en-le-Frith Town Hall in Market Street was completed in 1851.

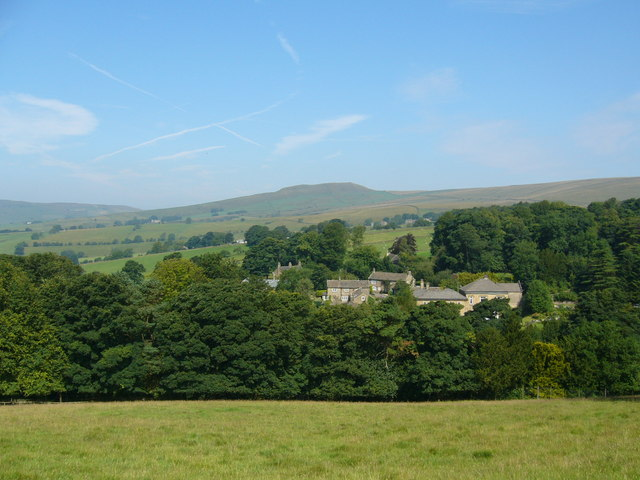
Ford Hall and surrounding buildings, with South Head in the background

Ford Hall in the east of the parish, northeast of Slacke Hall and Bowden Hall, was the home of the Reverend William Bagshaw, the 'Apostle of the Peak', after he was ejected from the vicarage of Chinley on the Act of Uniformity in 1662.

Also in the east of the parish, next to a lake alongside the A623 and not nationally listed for its architecture, is the modest Bennetston Hall, which is being renovated as a hotel. Nearby are the site of Peaslow's Cross, and Rushup Hall, a modest but ornate 19th-century private house.

Stodhart Lodge, a care home, is north of the town centre on Hayfield Road, the old road to Chapel Milton and the rest of the neighbouring parish of Chinley. It has a later 19th-century extension in the neo-gothic architectural style with a datestone inscribed "JB 1869".

Along the B5470 road west of the town are the linear settlements of Bridgefields, Cockyard and Tunstead Milton. Ollerenshaw Hall dates from c.1800 and stands below Eccles Pike.

=== Combs ===
The village of Combs, west of the town, gives its name to the adjacent Combs Reservoir. The Old Brook House (and its barn), close to the Beehive Inn in the centre of Combs, are listed buildings; parts of the house's grand layout clearly date from the 17th and 18th centuries and, as such, it is similar to Marsh Hall closer to Chapel.

In the rolling hills between Combs and Chapel is Bank Hall, extensively altered in 1872–74 for Henry Renshaw of Manchester on an ornate aerial plan with an elaborate stone balcony over the door, a bay window with fine botanical painted glass and canvas panels to the doors, formerly with painted panels by Armstrong and Caldecott. The south elevation of the house has a central Venetian doorway with columns either side of double-glazed doors—here too are voussoirs decorated with floral motifs, set in an imposing ashlar surround. Its nearby lodge, by W.E. Nesfield, is also listed, as is nearby Chapel railway station.

=== Dove Holes ===
Dove Holes, in the southeast of the parish, has its own station. Within the village lie the earthworks of a Neolithic henge known as the Bull Ring; the site also includes an oval and bowl barrow.

== Notable people ==
- Philip Marchington (1736–1808), merchant and political figure in the Nova Scotia House of Assembly in Canada from 1786 to 1793
- Peter Kirk (1840 in Townend – 1916), British-born American businessman, founded the US city of Kirkland, Washington
- Sam Longson (1900–1989), businessman and chairman of Derby County F.C.
- Gerald Sparrow (1903–1988), lawyer, judge and travel writer.
- Richard Wrottesley, 5th Baron Wrottesley (1918–1977), British peer and army officer
- Neville Buswell (1943–2019), actor known for his role as Ray Langton in Coronation Street
- Lloyd Cole (born 1961), singer and songwriter, lead singer of Lloyd Cole and the Commotions from 1984 to 1989
- Ross Hockenhull (born 1961), former racing driver in the 1989 International Formula 3000 season
- Matilda Simon, 3rd Baroness Simon of Wythenshawe (born 1955), retired academic, woodworker and first transgender peer

=== Sport ===
- James Frith (1860-1946), bowls player, team gold medallist at the 1930 British Empire Games
- John Hartle (1933–1968), road racer who competed in national, international and Grand Prix motorcycle racing events
- Jack Massey (born 1993), cruiserweight boxer

== See also ==
- Listed buildings in Chapel-en-le-Frith
