= Whaley Bridge =

Town in the High Peak, Derbyshire, England

Coordinates: 53.3304°N 1.9838°W

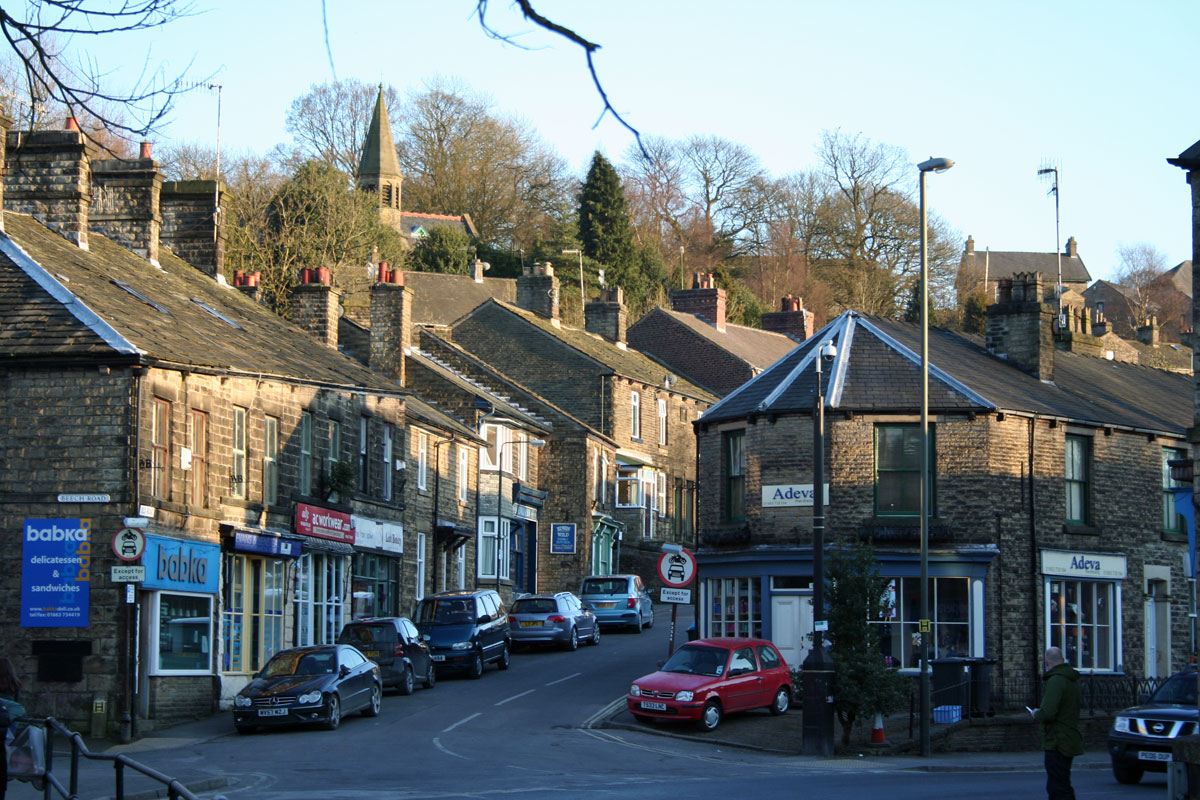
- Whaley Bridge town centre

- Location within Derbyshire
- Population: 6,311 (Parish, 2021)
- OS grid reference: SK 012 815
- District: High Peak
- Shire county: Derbyshire
- Region: East Midlands
- Country: England
- Sovereign state: United Kingdom
- Post town: HIGH PEAK
- Postcode district: SK23
- Dialling code: 01663
- Police: Derbyshire
- Fire: Derbyshire
- Ambulance: East Midlands
- UK Parliament: High Peak

Whaley Bridge (/ˈhweɪli/) is a town and civil parish in the High Peak district of Derbyshire, England. It is situated on the River Goyt, 16 miles (26 km) south-east of Manchester, 7 miles (11 km) north of Buxton, 9 miles (14 km) north-east of Macclesfield and 28 miles (45 km) west of Sheffield. The parish includes Furness Vale, Horwich End, Bridgemont, Fernilee, Stoneheads and Taxal; the parish had a population of 6,311 at the 2021 census. Whaley Bridge historically straddled Derbyshire and Cheshire until boundary changes in 1936 placed it entirely in Derbyshire.

== History ==
There is evidence of prehistoric activity in the area, including early Bronze Age standing stones, burial sites and the remains of a stone circle. A bronze-age axe head was discovered in 2005. There has long been speculation that the 'Roosdyche', a complex of banks and ditches on the eastern side of the town, is of prehistoric human origin, but investigations in 1962 concluded that it was formed by glacial meltwater.

The name of Weyley or Weylegh appears in many 13th-century documents and is derived from the Anglo Saxon weg lēah, meaning 'a clearing by the road'. In 1351, the lands of Weyley and Yeardsley were granted to William Joddrell for his faithful service to Edward, the Black Prince. In the 14th century, it housed the residence of William Jauderell and his descendants; their name also spelt 'Jodrell', who gave their name to the modern Jodrell Bank Observatory in Cheshire. The Jodrells continued to call their lands Yeardsley Whaley for centuries and, when the first local government board was formed in 1863 and the area became an urban district, the town adopted its popular name of Whaley Bridge; the town has been called so ever since. Parish records from the 1820s refer to Horridge rather than Horwich.

The River Goyt formed the historical boundary between Derbyshire and Cheshire. The Derbyshire side was part of the Forest of High Peak, while the Cheshire side was part of the Forest of Macclesfield.

Until the late 19th century, the population of the area grew slowly. For example, in the diocesan census in 1563, Taxal is recorded as having 26 households and, by the mid-18th century, Taxal and Yeardsley together only reached 55 households. In 1791, land at Whaley Bridge was advertised for sale; the owner believed that its waterpower would be useful in the textile industry, but the two townships remained very small and only had a population of 853 between them by 1841. Up to this time, agriculture and coalmining had been the main occupations.

The town expanded greatly in the Industrial Revolution and the population almost trebled to 2,322. Although there had been coal mines from earlier times, cotton mills had become the dominant industry by 1871. Coal mining took place in the area from its very early days because of a large geographical fault which traverses the Whaley Bridge basin from east to west; this results in the coal outcropping in various places. Documentary evidence of 1587 indicates a well-established coal industry in the Towneshepp of Weley, known today as Whaley Bridge. Today, there is less intensive agriculture labour and no coal mining in the area.

=== Today ===
Whaley Bridge continues to expand as new housing is built, but retains the character of a small town. As the self-styled Gateway to the Goyt, it attracts tourists, mainly walkers, but has not become dominated by the tourist industry, unlike some other local towns and villages. The Peak District Boundary Walk runs through the village.

The town has been twinned with Tymbark, Poland, since June 1994.

=== Cromford and High Peak Railway ===
The Cromford and High Peak Railway was granted Parliamentary consent in 1825. It was fully opened for passenger and goods traffic on 6 July 1831. The railway linked the wharf at the head of the Whaley Bridge Branch of the Peak Forest Canal to the Cromford Canal at Cromford Wharf. It had seven inclined planes, the first being situated within the town of Whaley Bridge itself. Unlike the other six inclined planes, which were operated by stationary steam engines, this one was operated by a horse-driven gin, which remained operational until 9 April 1952. This plane was much shorter than the others, being only 180 yards (165 m) long and rising at 1:13.5. Approach to the top of the plane was under a very low bridge and, because of this, waggons had to be hauled to and from the top of the plane by horses.

Horses also worked the bottom section of the line and the tracks ran onto a wharf and into two mills. Another notable feature on the bottom section is an iron bridge that carries the line across the River Goyt.

=== Peak Forest Canal ===
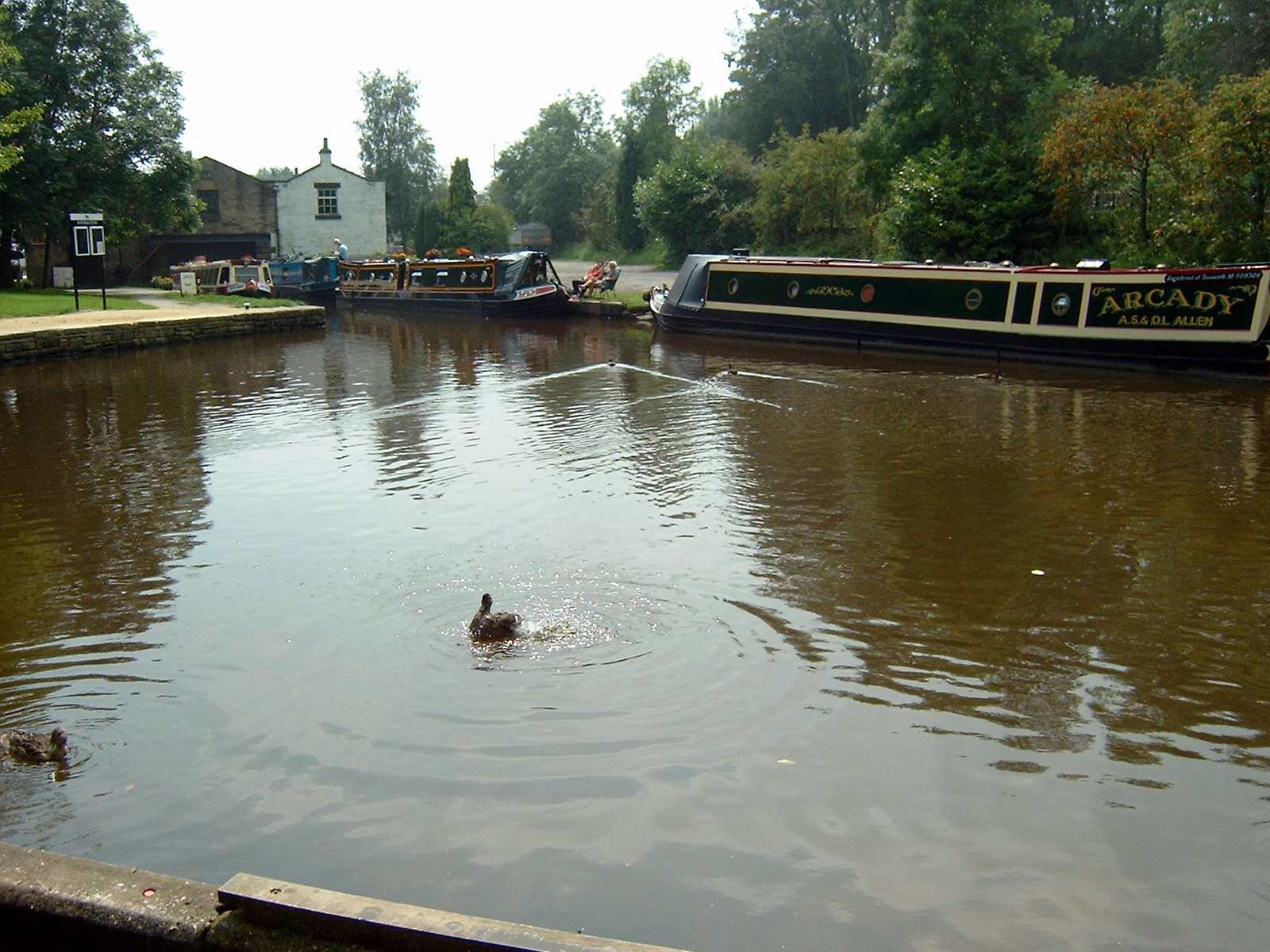
The canal basin in Whaley Bridge

The Peak Forest Canal and basin were built in the 1790s and opened on 1 May 1800. An important Grade II listed building at the head of the Peak Forest Canal was the Transhipment Warehouse, built in 1801 and extended after the arrival of the railway in 1832. In this building, goods and minerals were transferred to and from the many working canal boats servicing local industry. The building straddles the head of the canal which is fed by the Combs and Toddbrook reservoirs to the south. The canal splits just outside Whaley Bridge, turning east to end at Buxworth basin and turning west to Marple, the Cheshire Ring and Manchester. The Goyt Way runs for 10 miles (16 km) from Etherow Country Park to Whaley Bridge, partly along the canal towpath, and is part of the 230-mile (370 km) Midshires Way which runs from Stockport through the English Midlands to Buckinghamshire.

=== 1872 Whaley Bridge Flood ===
On 19 June 1872, a massive flood became one of the worst in English history. The town received as much as 2 inches of rain in 24 hours.

=== 2019 evacuation ===
On 1 August 2019, part of the town was evacuated on the orders of Derbyshire Police after flooding caused damage to the dam at Toddbrook Reservoir. Parts of nearby Furness Vale and New Mills were also evacuated. The Royal Air Force and all high-volume pumping units from various fire services were drafted in, along with Chinook helicopters bringing in aggregate and providing support. The Environment Agency and Derbyshire Fire Brigade reported that the dam was at "real risk of collapse", with 1,500 residents being evacuated from the town. After the first day, the water level of the dam had been reduced by half a metre, but authorities said this would need to fall several metres before it could be considered safe. The targeted reduction in the reservoir water level of 8 metres (26 ft) was achieved on 6 August 2019.

== Governance ==
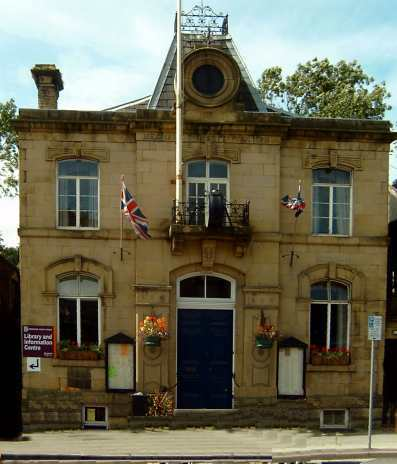
Mechanics' Institute, which serves as town hall, function room and library

There are three main tiers of local government covering Whaley Bridge, at civil parish (town), district and county level: Whaley Bridge Town Council, High Peak Borough Council, and Derbyshire County Council. The county council is also a member of the East Midlands Combined County Authority, led by the directly elected Mayor of the East Midlands. Whaley Bridge Town Council is based at the Mechanics' Institute at 27 Market Street.

Whaley Bridge is surrounded by, but not part of, the Peak District National Park.

=== Administrative history ===
On the Cheshire side of the River Goyt was the ancient parish of Taxal, which comprised two townships: Yeardsley-cum-Whaley, and a Taxal township which covered the original village of Taxal plus an extensive and sparsely populated rural area, particularly to the south of the village. The Derbyshire side of the river included parts of two townships: Fernilee (which included Shallcross and Horwich), and Chapel-en-le-Frith. Both these townships were anciently part of the parish of Hope, but Chapel-en-le-Frith had become a separate parish by the 14th century.

From the 17th century onwards, parishes were gradually given various civil functions under the poor laws, in addition to their original ecclesiastical functions. In some cases, including Taxal, Hope, and Chapel-en-le-Frith, the civil functions were exercised by each township separately rather than the parish as a whole. In 1866, the legal definition of 'parish' was changed to be the areas used for administering the poor laws, and so the townships also became civil parishes.

The Yeardsley-cum-Whaley township, which contained the main part but not all of the growing urban area of Whaley Bridge, was made a local government district in 1863, administered by an elected local board. Such districts were reconstituted as urban districts under the Local Government Act 1894. At the same time, the civil parishes of Chapel-en-le-Frith and Fernilee on the Derbyshire side of the Goyt were included in the Chapel en le Frith Rural District.

In 1936, a county review order abolished the Yeardsley-cum-Whaley Urban District and replaced it with a larger urban district called Whaley Bridge, which also took in Fernilee, part of Chapel-en-le-Frith, and the northern part of Taxal including the village. (The more rural southern part of the abolished parish of Taxal was added to Hartington Upper Quarter.) There were more minor adjustments to the boundaries with the neighbouring parishes of Disley and Kettleshulme at the same time. The county boundary was adjusted to place the new Whaley Bridge Urban District entirely in Derbyshire.

Whaley Bridge Urban District was abolished in 1974 under the Local Government Act 1972. District-level functions passed to the new High Peak Borough Council. A successor parish called Whaley Bridge covering the area of the former urban district was created at the same time, with its parish council taking the name Whaley Bridge Town Council.

== Education ==
The town has two primary schools: Whaley Bridge Primary School and Taxal & Fernilee Church of England Primary School. For secondary education, children must travel further afield, typically to Chapel-en-le-Frith, New Mills, Hope Valley, Buxton, Macclesfield or Stockport. Schools in these areas include Chapel-en-le-Frith High School, New Mills School, Hope Valley College, King's School and Stockport Grammar School.

== Transport ==
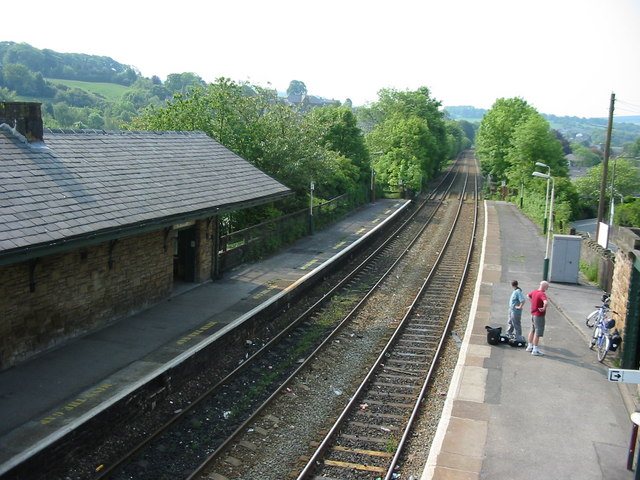
Whaley Bridge station

Whaley Bridge railway station is on the Buxton line between Manchester Piccadilly, Stockport and Buxton. There is a generally hourly service in each direction, operated by Northern Trains.

The town is served by bus services operated primarily by High Peak. This includes the 199 skyline service, which runs every 30 minutes between Buxton, Stockport and Manchester Airport. Other services in the town run to Glossop, Hayfield, Macclesfield and New Mills.

== Media ==
Local news and television programmes are provided by BBC North West and ITV Granada. Television signals are received from one of the 4 local relay transmitters (Whaley Bridge, Ladder Hill, Chinley and Birch Vale).

Local radio stations are BBC Radio Manchester on 95.1 FM, Greatest Hits Radio Midlands on 103.3 FM, and Whaley Radio, a community based station that broadcast on 107.4 FM.

The town is served by the local newspaper, Buxton Advertiser.

== Religious sites ==
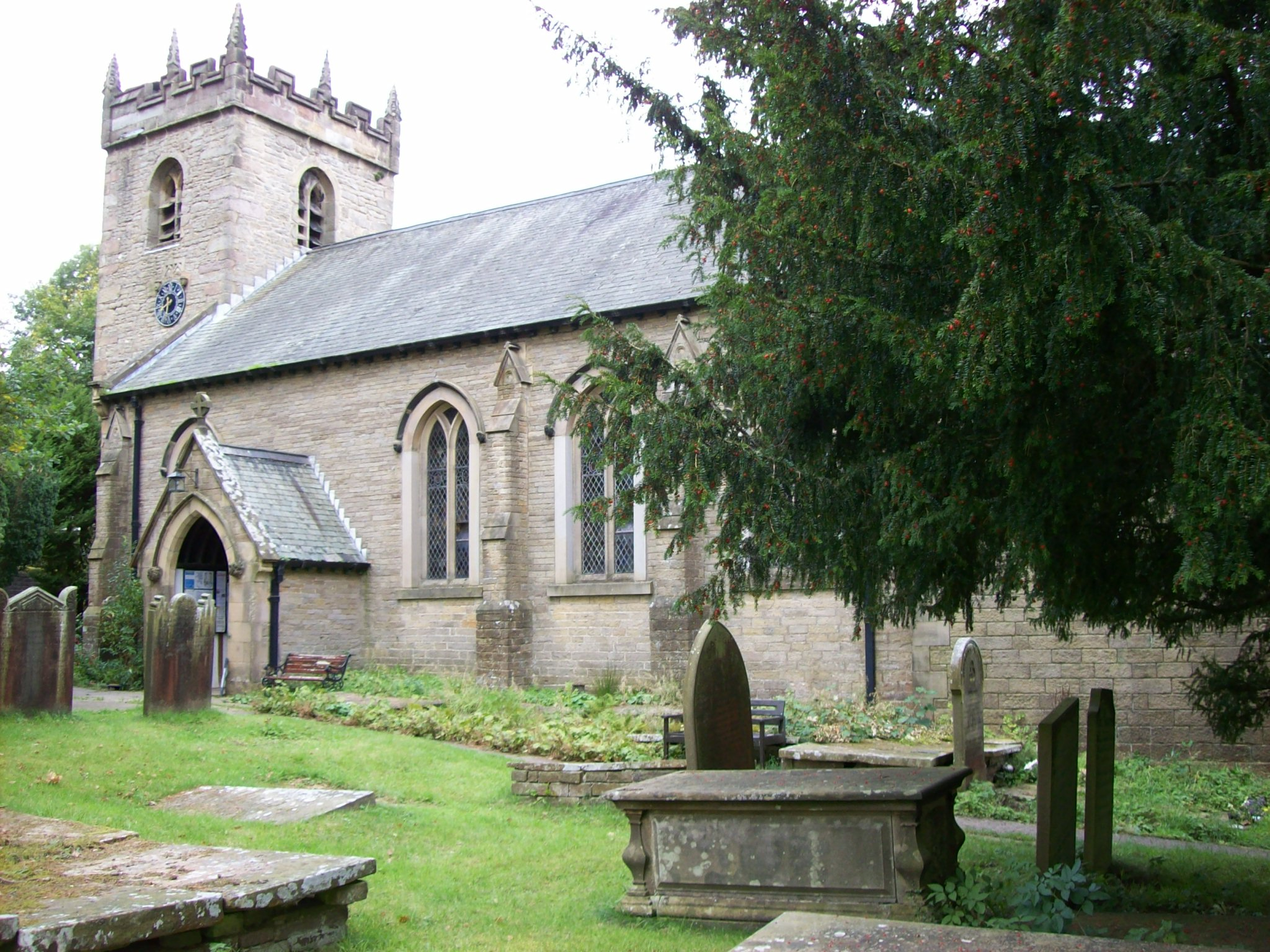
Parish church of St James at Taxal

The Church of England parish of Whaley Bridge has two churches. St James, Taxal, stands on a site a mile from the town centre and was established in the 12th century. Parts of the fabric of the bell tower date back to that time, although the tower was rebuilt in the late 16th or early 17th century. The rest of the church building was fully rebuilt in 1825 and restored in 1889 when the chancel was also enlarged. However, many internal elements of the earlier church were retained, including the 17th-century communion rail and panelling, 18th-century monuments and a royal coat of arms from the reign of Queen Anne. It is a Grade II* listed building. Holy Trinity Church, Fernilee, was established near the town centre in 1905. Parts of the town are included in the Cheshire parish of St John, Disley, and are served by the Church of St John the Divine, Furness Vale.

The Roman Catholic Church of the Sacred Heart, Whaley Lane, serves the parish of Whaley Bridge and Disley.

The United Reformed Church and Methodists formed a local ecumenical partnership, the "Whaley Bridge Uniting Partnership" in 1983, subsequently joined by the Baptists. The partnership has three places of worship: Whaley Bridge Uniting Church, Fernilee Methodist Church and Kettleshulme Chapel.

The Good News Church is an evangelical church based in the Gospel Hall, Old Road.

Whaley Hall is a large detached Victorian house near Toddbrook Reservoir. Since 1979 it has been a retreat house and conference centre run by the Community of the King of Love, an ecumenical community of men and women. The painting Magistrate of Brussels, by Anthony van Dyck, hung there, unrecognised, during the first decade of the 21st century.

== Festivals and traditions ==
Whaley Bridge has an annual carnival month in June. This launches on the second weekend of the month with 'Whaley Water Weekend', commonly known as W3. Launched in 2000, W3 started out as a small community event on the canal basin. It was relaunched in 2010 as a music and arts festival, building on its waterways core. The last event saw several thousand visitors, with record numbers taking advantage of free short canal boat rides and a longer heritage trip to Bugsworth Basin. In the evening crowds watched free live music on the outdoor stage. 2012 saw W3 enter into a partnership with the Canal & River Trust where they adopted the canal basin and the Peak Forest canal to the Bugsworth Arm.

The weekend of W3 is followed by the Well Dressing Weekend, a traditional Derbyshire event in which the local well is decorated with large collages of cones, flower petals, etc. Carnival month ends with the Rose Queen Carnival, started over a hundred years ago, where groups of local young people from the town, Rose Queen royalty from other villages and invited bands process through the main streets in their finery and on decorated floats culminating in events, stalls and entertainment held at Whaley Bridge Bowling Club. In 2009 a fell race, known as the Whaley Waltz, was added to the Rose Queen programme, and it annually attracts over 180 runners. Organised by Goyt Valley Striders, the race starts in the centre of the village and climbs 900 ft to Windgather Rocks and finishes after crossing the River Goyt on Forge Road. Following the carnival is the Rose Queen Pet Show, where locals bring their pets to compete in different classes.

November 2012 saw the relaunch of Whaley Bridge's firework event, with a new team of volunteers after the Round Table felt they were unable to continue. This also incorporated the town's first lantern parade.

The final event of the year is the switching on of the Christmas tree lights outside the Jodrell Arms Hotel, close to Whaley Bridge railway station. This is usually done by the chair of the Town Council and is accompanied by seasonable music from members of Whaley Bridge Brass Band. Father Christmas traditionally arrives at the Transshipment Warehouse on the Whaley Wharf of the Peak Forest Canal on a canal boat and processes to the Mechanics' Institute accompanied by his helpers. Businesses make their contribution to the town's Christmas decorations by way of small trees above their shops. The Town Council erects two large trees each year, the second being by the Soldier Dick public house at Furness Vale.

== Notable residents ==
- Abraham Bennet (1749–1799), clergyman and physicist who invented the gold-leaf electroscope, was baptised in Taxal.
- Thomas Barker (1838–1907), mathematician and professor of cryptogamic botany, lived locally on retirement.
- Edwina Currie (born 1946), politician, MP for South Derbyshire 1983–1997 and TV personality, currently resides in Whaley Bridge.
- Jon Dasilva (born 1963), British DJ and record producer
- Betty Driver (1920–2011), actress and author, played Betty Williams on Coronation Street, was once the landlady of Whaley Bridge's Cock Inn.
- Ruth George (born 1969), politician, MP for High Peak 2017–2019, now a Derbyshire County Councillor
- Michael Heathcote (1733–1760), Groom of the Pantry and Yeoman of the Mouth (food taster) to King George III.
- William Jauderell, an archer for Edward the Black Prince in the 14th century, came from Yeardsley and was buried in Taxal.

=== Sport ===
- Jack Bond (1932–2019), Lancashire and Nottinghamshire cricketer, was landlord of the Jodrell Arms.
- Thomas Higson (1911–1993), cricketer who played 26 first-class cricket games for Derbyshire
- Brian Jackson (1933–2024), cricketer who played for Derbyshire CCC, lived in the town and was Chairman of the local volunteer centre.
- Bill Jones (1921–2010), Liverpool and England footballer and Military Medal winner, was born in Whaley Bridge in 1921.
- Jennifer Pinches (born 1994), artistic gymnast who competed in the 2012 Summer Olympics, lives in Whaley Bridge.

== Literary references ==
Whaley Bridge features in the novel The Manchester Man (1876) by Isabella Banks. The fictional Coronation Street character Minnie Caldwell retired to become a housekeeper in Whaley Bridge in 1976. In the travel section of The Sunday Telegraph, Tony Robinson writes of the Manchester to Derby journey "It is not a trip to do all in one go; stop off at the dramatic little town of Whaley Bridge and have a stroll around the historic Peak Forest Canal Basin".

== See also ==
- Listed buildings in Whaley Bridge
