= Chapel-en-le-Frith High School =

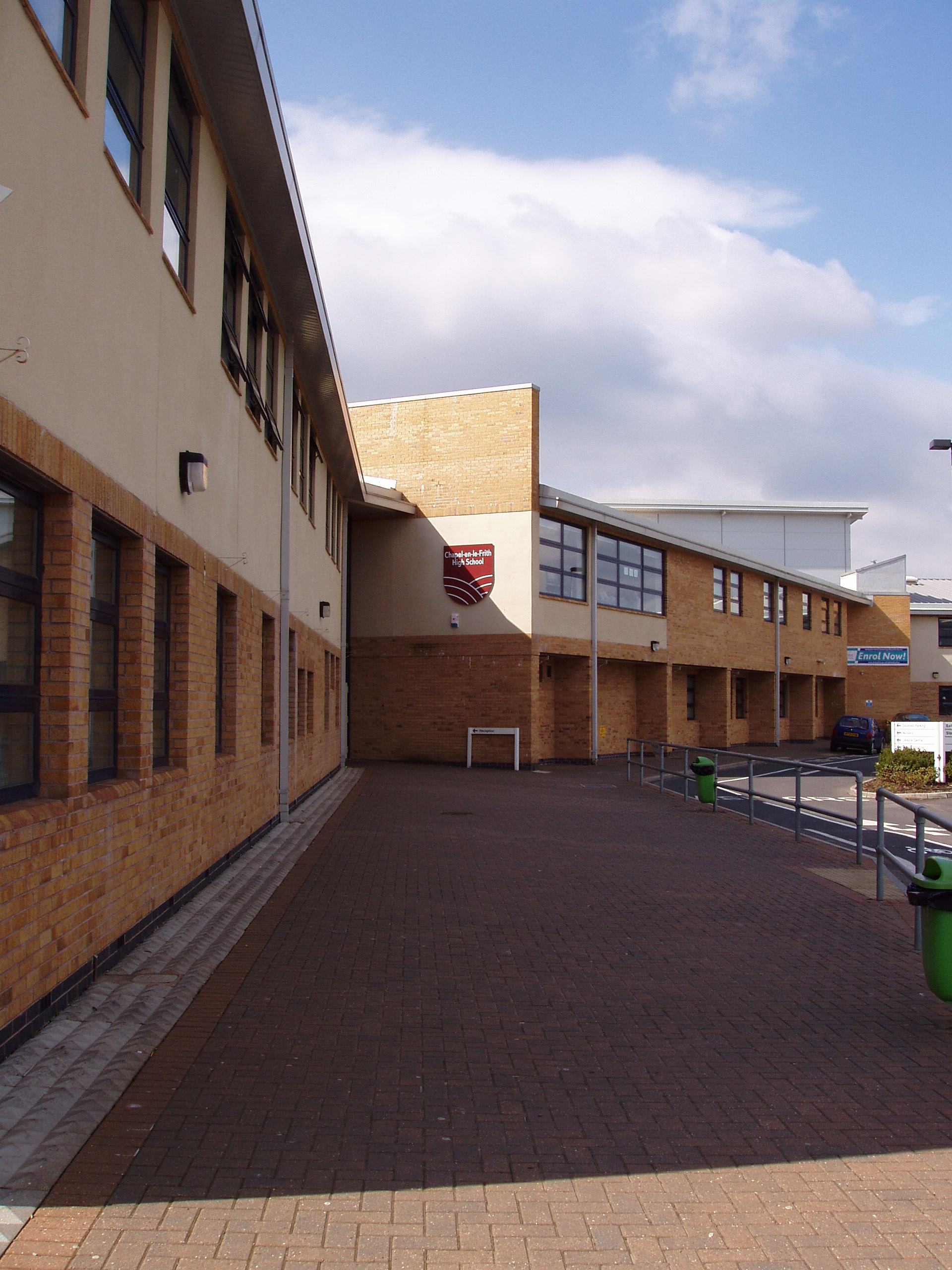
- Along the front of the school, towards reception

Location
- Long Lane; Chapel-en-le-Frith, Derbyshire, SK23 0TQ; England; 53.3186°N 1.9224°W

Information
- Type: Community school
- Motto: Striving for Excellence
- Established: 1952; 74 years ago
- Local authority: Derbyshire County Council
- Department for Education URN: 112932 Tables
- Ofsted: Reports
- Chair: Andrew Semple
- Head: Greg Raynor
- Gender: Mixed
- Age: 11 to 16
- Enrollment: 932
- Houses: Bowden; Combs; Hollins; Kinder
- Colours: Black and red
- Publication: Chapel Eye
- Website: www.chapelhigh.org.uk

Chapel-en-le-Frith High School is a mixed gender comprehensive school in Chapel-en-le-Frith in the county of Derbyshire, England. It serves pupils aged 11 to 16 from the town and surrounding areas.

The building is maintained by Mitie. Chartwells provide the catering.

== History ==
The school was established in 1952 as Chapel-en-le-Frith Secondary Modern. It has since been renamed three times: Long Lane Comprehensive School, Chapel-en-le-Frith County Secondary School and finally Chapel-en-le-Frith High School.

In 2005, it was rebuilt on the original playing fields of the school and the former site was then redeveloped as the school's new sports fields. The school is housed in a specially built one-piece building.

There have only been five headteachers to date. Stuart Ash retired in the 2010/11 academic year and was replaced by Simon Grieves, who was succeeded by Greg Raynor in May 2025.

== Admissions ==
Admission is open to all pupils aged 11–16 residing in the catchment area. As of January 2017 the number of pupils on roll is 932.

== Academic performance ==
In 2015, 71% of the school's pupils achieved at least five A*–C GCSE results including maths and English. This was significantly above the averages nationally and for the Derbyshire Local Education Authority, 53.8% and 55.9% respectively. It does not have a sixth form.

The school was judged to be good by Ofsted on 15 May 2019.

== Daily life ==
=== Uniform ===
The school uniform is a white polo shirt with the school motto ("Striving for Excellence") on the chest, a red stripe on the collar and sleeves; a black sweatshirt with the school emblem, and black trousers. It used to be a classic shirt-and-tie uniform, but changed several years after the school moved into the new building.

=== Houses ===
The four school houses (Bowden, Combs, Hollins and Kinder) are named after local hills in the area.

=== Learning Support department ===
The department has a selection of specially trained staff who work full-time undertaking special lessons with those pupils who have been deemed to need support.

== Notable former pupils ==
- Andrew Bingham, former MP for High Peak, was a pupil at the school, when it was called Long Lane Comprehensive.
- Paralympic triple Gold Medallist Anthony Kappes MBE went to the school.
