= Swinscoe (disambiguation) =

Swinscoe may refer to:

- Swinscoe, a small village in Staffordshire, England.

== People ==
- Terry Swinscoe (b. 1934), English association football player.

== See also ==
- Blore with Swinscoe, civil parish in England.
