= A roads in Zone 5 of the Great Britain numbering scheme =

The numbering zones for A-roads in Great Britain

List of A roads in zone 5 in Great Britain starting north/east of the A5, west of the A6, south of the Solway Firth/Eden Estuary (roads beginning with 5).

== Single- and double-digit roads ==
Road	From	To	Notes
A5	Central London (Marble Arch)	Holyhead	Forms parts of the historical route of Watling Street. The section from M1 J4 north of Edgware to N. of Dunstable is now numbered A5183. The A5 now starts at M1 J11A and runs west to join previous alignment.
A50	Leicester	Warrington	Becomes M1 motorway between junctions 22 and 24A. Used to start at Hockliffe on A5, north of Dunstable. Gradually cut back to Northampton, then Leicester. Before opening of Derby southern bypass in 1997, it followed present A511 between Markfield and Foston. Also used as a provisional number for the London-Yorkshire motorway that eventually became the M1.
A51	Chester	Kingsbury	Formerly ending at the A5 in Tamworth, the road to the south was the northern end of the A423. When the latter was downgraded north of Coventry, the A51 was extended to the A47. Subsequently, the A47 too was downgraded (to the B1114) and the A51 was then cut back to its present terminus near Kingsbury.
A52	Newcastle-under-Lyme	Mablethorpe	
A53	Buxton	Shrewsbury	
A54	Tarvin	Buxton	The section between Congleton and Buxton is the most dangerous road in Britain.
A55	Holyhead	Chester	Also known as the "North Wales Expressway".
A56	Chester	A59 near Broughton	
A57	Liverpool	Lincoln	
A58	Prescot	Wetherby	Becomes A58(M) as part of Leeds Inner Ring Road
A59	Wallasey	York	

== Three-digit roads ==
Road	From	To	Notes
A500	Clayton	Nantwich	Known locally as the D Road, either because its route resembles the curved part of a letter D (with a section of the M6 forming the upright) or after the Roman numeral 'D' (500). Originally ran from the A5 at Marble Arch to the A1 at Tally Ho Corner in North Finchley. In 1935 it was extended and rerouted over the A5088 Watford Bypass (the original route became the A598). Renumbered to A41 in the 1950s when it was deemed sensible to give the lower numbers of the bypassed routes to new-build bypasses and radials north of London.
A501	Westway (London)	Moorgate	Part of the London Inner Ring Road, comprises Marylebone Road, Euston Road, Pentonville Road and City Road. Terminates at junction with London Wall.
A502	Camden Town	Hendon	Through Hampstead, broadly follows the Edgware branch of the Northern Line for 5 stations.
A503	Camden Town	Woodford	Camden Road and Seven Sisters Road (primary) and Ferry Lane (non-primary), though Holloway and Walthamstow
A504	West Hendon	Tottenham Hale	via Hendon, Finchley, East Finchley, Muswell Hill, Hornsey and West Green. Has recently been extended to include Broad Lane as the A503 is now two-way.
A505	Leighton Buzzard	Great Abington	
A506	Walton	Stanley Gate nr. Bickerstaffe	Part of the road has since been reassigned to the M58 Motorway; in the 1970s part of it served the New Town of Skelmersdale Originally ran from the A5 in Hockliffe to the A508 south of Northampton. Became a southern extension of the A50 in 1935 but was downgraded in 1974 and is now A4012, A5130, A509 and B526.
A507	Buntingford	M1 junction 13	The northern terminus and the course of the road have recently been changed to bypass Ridgmont.
A508	Old Stratford	Market Harborough	
A509	Milton Keynes	Kettering	Forms the H5 Portway in Milton Keynes.
A510	Wellingborough	Cranford St John	Forms part of Wellingborough's outer ring road, passes through Finedon and ends at Junction 11 of the A14 at Cranford St John.
A511	Markfield	Foston, Derbyshire	Historical A50(T). The original route went from Atherstone to Burton upon Trent; the Atherstone-Twycross section became the B4116 and the Twycross-Burton section became a northern extension of the A444 in 1935. The A511 number also appeared in the "Co-driver: The AA Motorists Companion" (1965) on a route linking the M6 to Wigan. Only the first section east of the M6 was built, however, and it is designated as the A5209.
A512	Loughborough	A42 & A511 near Ashby-de-la-Zouch	
A513	Tamworth	Stafford	Starts in Stafford, running through the town of Rugeley (although the road here is broken at Armitage Road due to recent road changes including the re-routing of the A51 which is now the Rugeley Eastern By-Pass (which runs south to Tamworth).
A514	Derby	Swadlincote	It is a 15-mile (24 km) stretch of single-carriageway road which crosses the A5111 Derby ring road before a separated grade junction with the dual-carriageway A50 road. A little further south, the A5132 runs off to the west, just before the A514 crosses the River Trent over the narrow and historic Swarkestone Bridge. The next significant junction is with the A511, where it enters a built up area. The road continues through Swadlincote, and terminates at its junction with the A444 road (52.7670°N 1.5924°W) just west of the town.
A515	Lichfield	Buxton	
A516	Derby	Hilton	
A517	Belper	Ashbourne	
A518	Uttoxeter	Telford	Between Uttoxeter and Stafford it is a single carriageway, with a staggered junction with the dual carriageway A51. Entering Stafford from the east, it passes through the former Stafford Beaconside campus of Staffordshire University before hitting a roundabout with the A513, which at this point is named 'Beaconside'. It then heads into Stafford as 'Weston Road', passing around the town centre and heading out along 'Newport Road' and under the M6 motorway towards Telford.
A519	Newcastle-under-Lyme	Newport	At Newport it meets the A518 and A41. It heads broadly north, passing via Eccleshall, junction 15 of the M6 motorway, and then meets the A53 and various other roads in Newcastle-under-Lyme town centre. The road follows the first part of the route of the medieval road from Shrewsbury to York, which passed through the ancient Forest of Lyme. Prior to Tudor times, this was the only major highway from the West Midlands to the North.
A520	Stone	Leek	
A521	Meir	Froghall	
A522	Uttoxeter	Wetley Rocks	
A523	Swinscoe	Hazel Grove	This became part of the A52 (except for the spur in Leek; the current route of the A52 west of there was the A524 at the time), but the changes were undone almost immediately.
A524			First used from Fenny Bentley to Great Rowsley; swapped with the B5056 around 1970. Used again in the 1990s from Swinscoe to Newcastle-under-Lyme (formerly part of the A52). This almost immediately became part of the A52 again, as the old route of the A52 reverted to the previous designation of A523.
A525	Rhyl	Newcastle-under-Lyme	
A526	Woolfall Heath M57_{J3}	Woolfall Heath A57	Seth Powell Way Originally ran between Newcastle-under-Lyme to Salford; renumbered as a portion of the A34 in 1935. Portions in Manchester are now parts of the A5145, A6010, B5093, and B5117.
A527	Newcastle-under-Lyme	Congleton	
A528	Wrexham	Shrewsbury	
A529	Hinstock	Nantwich	Originally ran from the A51 in Boughton to the A464 on the northern edge of Hinstock. Renumbered to a portion of a rerouted A41 in 1935; the northern end is now the A5115 after the A41 was rerouted onto the Chester bypass. The Market Drayton section has been listed among the top 50 most dangerous roads in the UK in recent times.
A530	Whitchurch	Northwich	
A531	Madeley Heath	Weston	
A532	Crewe Green	Marshfield Bank, Crewe	
A533	Alsager	Widnes	The road is a primary route between Middlewich and Runcorn and crosses the Runcorn-Widnes Bridge.
A534	Wrexham	Congleton	Follows the course of one of the historic "Salt ways" that ran from Nantwich into Wales. Part of its central section, between Broxton and Bickerton Hill, is still called 'Salters Lane'.
A535	Holmes Chapel	Alderley Edge	via Twemlow Green, past Jodrell Bank, via Chelford
A536	Congleton	Macclesfield	
A537	Knutsford	Buxton	The section between Macclesfield and Buxton has been named the most dangerous road in Britain. See also Cat and Fiddle Road.
A538	Macclesfield	Altrincham	Passes underneath the runways of Manchester Airport
A539	Eglwys Cross	Llangollen	
A540	Chester	Hoylake	It is the only road in the series A54X that is entirely within England. It provides links to Manchester and North Wales, via the A494 and the M56. It bypasses the town of Neston and is in the heart of Heswall, Hoylake and West Kirby. A small stretch of the road, shared with the A5116, is a primary road.
A541	Wrexham	Trefnant	
A542	Llangollen	Llandegla	crosses the Horseshoe Pass
A543	Pentrefoelas	Bodfari	
A544	Bylchau	Llanfair Talhaiarn	Originally ran from north of Betws-y-Coed to Llandudno. In 1935, the section south of the A55 was renumbered as a northern extension of the A496 and the southern section became the B5115; the entire route is now part of the A470.
A545	Menai Bridge	Beaumaris	
A546	Tywyn	Llandudno	
A547	Prestatyn	Conwy	Largely follows North Wales coast. Alternative to A55 North Wales Expressway.
A548	Chester	Llanrwst	
A549	Drury	Mold	
A550	Caergwrle	Hooton	Primary (and trunk) in England, non-primary in Wales with 2½ miles of A494 in between.
A551	Seacombe	Gayton	
A552	Birkenhead	West Kirby	
A553	Birkenhead	Hoylake	
A554	Birkenhead	Bidston	
A555	Manchester Airport	Hazel Grove	Starts at the M56 Spur at Manchester Airport and ends at the A6 just southeast of Hazel Grove Originally ran from Ellsmere Port to the A51 at Backford; extended to the A51/A5032 in Little Sutton by 1929. Renumbered as an extension of the A5032 in 1935. Used a second time in 1935 for the Barnet Bypass (former A5092 and A5093). After the pre Worboys direction signs were introduced, it was decided to give the route a more unique number to aid navigation, and it became a portion of the A1 in 1954. Some portions are now the A1(M) and A1001.
A556	Delamere	Bowdon	Northern section takes traffic from and to M6 J19 and M56 J7 for Manchester Airport and South Manchester
A557	Sutton Weaver	Rainhill, St Helens M62_{J7}	Section south of Runcorn, known as the Weston Point Expressway
A558	Daresbury	Runcorn	Daresbury Expressway
A559	Sandiway	Stretton, Cheshire	
A560	Altrincham	Hattersley	
A561	Halewood	Liverpool	
A562	Liverpool	Penketh	
A563	A6 London Road, Oadby	A47, Crown Hills, Evington	Leicester Ring Road The original A563 appeared in the 1922 Road Lists as "Liverpool - Manchester (Proposed new road)"; the route never appeared on any maps nor did it appear on the ground. A 1932 map does show a proposed A road between Walton, Liverpool and Pendlebury, Salford; this opened in 1934 as the A580, although it is likely it took over at least some of the concept of the A563.
A564			The original A564 went from the A59 in Liverpool to the A567; rarely appears on maps due to its short length, and as a result it is unknown when the route was decommissioned, but it is now part of the A567. Next used in the 1990s to refer to sections of the upgraded A50 (e.g. from Foston to Etwall) before the A50 was rerouted; became part of the A50 in 1998.
A565	Bootle	Tarleton	
A566	Bootle	Orrell Park	
A567	Seaforth	Scotland Road, Liverpool	
A568			Was the road between Widnes and Lea Green railway station, St Helens. Downgraded to the B5419 due to completion of the A557 Widnes bypass.
A569	Bold Heath	St Helens	Originally ran between Widnes and Prescot, cutting the corner between the A568 and A57. Split in two by the M62, but was rerouted to meet it. Now unclassified.
A570	Rainhill, St Helens_{M62 J7}	Southport	
A571	St Helens	Wigan	
A572	Swinton	St Helens	
A573	Winwick, Cheshire	Wigan	
A574	Leigh, Butts Bridge	Sankey Bridges, Warrington	Also spurs to M62 J11
A575	Bolton	Worsley, M60 J13	
A576	Stretford	Middleton	
A577	Boothstown	Ormskirk	
A578	Leigh	Hindley Green	
A579	Breightmet	Winwick Interchange M6 J22	
A580	Liverpool	Salford	The East Lancs Road Originally ran between Boar's Head and Duxbury Hall; became the A5106, probably early on as the number was recycled in 1934.
A581	Chorley	Rufford	
A582	A6 near Lostock Hall	M55 J2	The "Edith Rigby Way" extension between the A583 and M55 opened in July 2023. Future plan for a new bridge over River Ribble to connect the two ends and create a western bypass for Preston is expected by 2026.
A583	Blackpool	Preston	
A584	Clifton	Little Bispham	
A585	Kirkham	Fleetwood	
A586	Garstang	Blackpool	
A587	Blackpool	Fleetwood	
A588	Poulton-Le-Fylde	Lancaster	
A589	Halton	Heysham	
A590	A65	Barrow-in-Furness	
A591	A590	Bothel	
A592	Newby Bridge	Penrith	
A593	Broughton-in-Furness	Ambleside	
A594 (Cumbria)	Maryport	Cockermouth	
A594 (Leicester)	Leicester	Leicester	Leicester Central Ring Road
A595	Carlisle	Dalton-in-Furness	
A596	Thursby	Workington	
A597	Workington	Distington	Northside Bridge in Workington, which carries part of the route, destroyed in November 2009 floods and was rebuilt and completed in 2012.
A598	Hampstead	North Finchley	Commences at the junction of Finchley Road and Hendon Way on the A41. It goes through Golders Green and crosses the A406 and A1 at Henlys Corner, then heads through Regents Park Road to the centre of Finchley and Ballards Lane up to Tally-Ho Corner where it terminates on the A1000. Originally ran from Maghull to Scarisbrick; did not appear in the 1922 Road Lists, but was upgraded from the B5196 by the end of the 1920s. Renumbered as an extension of the then-A567 in 1935 and is now the A5147.
A599	Haydock Park Racecourse	Blackbrook Bypass, St Helens	

== Four-digit roads (50xx) ==
Road	From	To	Notes
A5000	A504, Finchley	A598, Finchley	The section of Hendon Lane north of Gravel Hill. Originally all of Hendon Lane and the A504 to the West of it was part of the A5000, although some old maps have the A5000 ending at the west on the A502, with that number taking over the remainder.
A5001	Rushden	Rushden	
A5002			First allocated to a road from the A6 to the A510 in Finedon; became a spur of the A510 in the 1935 renumbering, but was later declassified (probably not long after the renumbering) and is now Obelisk Road. Next used from Macclesfield to Whaley Bridge. The section from Whaley Bridge to Buxton became the A5004 due to rerouting of the A6; the remainder was downgraded to a section of the B5470 a few years later.
A5003			Ran from A51 George Street to A453 Aldergate in Tamworth; route declassified due to road upgrades in Tamworth. Much of route now pedestrianized.
A5004	Whaley Bridge	Buxton	Number for the former A6 between Buxton and Whaley Bridge. Previously allocated to a road from Station Road to B5010 via Donington Lane north of Castle Donington; this was declassified in the 1960s.
A5005	Longton, Staffordshire	Barlaston	
A5006	Stoke-upon-Trent	Hanley	Previously used for the M6 to Hanford section of the A500.
A5007	Stoke upon Trent	Fenton	
A5008	Burslem	Bucknall	
A5009	Bucknall	Baddeley Green	
A5010	Burslem	Burslem	
A5011	Talke	Alsager	
A5012	Cromford	A515	Originally ran from the A5 to the A49 in Shrewsbury. Became a spur of the A53 in 1934 after the A5 Shrewsbury Bypass opened, but is now part of the town center one-way system and is unclassified and pedestrianized, linking the A5191 to itself.
A5013	Stafford	Eccleshall	Originally ran from the A5 near Mardol to Chester Road along Smithfield Road. Renumbered as a southern extension of the A53 in 1934, and is now the eastern end of the A458 or A488 (depending on the map).
A5014	Old Trafford	Stretford	Originally ran along Cross Street in Ellesmere, now unclassified.
A5015	Burleydam	Burleydam	
A5016	A49 west of Nantwich	A534 west of Nantwich	Signage says this is now part of the A534, but OS 1:25k mapping says this road still exists.
A5017			Ran along Millstone Lane in Nantwich from the A530 to the A534 and became part of the A51 when it was rerouted in the 1970s and became a portion of the B5074 when the A51 was rerouted onto the bypass. Number reused for Elliot Street and Parker Street in Liverpool; this is now partially pedestrianized with the east end of Elliot Street part of the A5038 or A5044.
A5018	Winsford	Wharton Green	
A5019	Crewe	Crewe	
A5020	A500 _{near Englesea-Brook}	Crewe Green	
A5021			Ran along Leadsmithy Street from the A533 to the A54 in Middlewich; now part of the A533.
A5022	Sandbach	Brereton Green	
A5023			Ran from the A526 (now A34) to the A54 in Congleton via Mill Street; now unclassified.
A5024			Ran from the A536 to the A523 in Macclesfield via Sunderland Street; now unclassified.
A5025	Llanfairpwllgwyngyll	Near Valley	
A5026	Lloc	Walwen	
A5027	Liscard	Upton	
A5028	Higham Ferrers	Rushden	Also used to designate Borough Road, Wallasey
A5029	Birkenhead	Birkenhead	
A5030	Birkenhead	Birkenhead	
A5031			Ran from the then-A552 Hamilton Street to the A51 (now A41) Chester Street in Birkenhead along Market and Cross streets; now unclassified.
A5032	Backford	Ellesmere Port	
A5033	Knutsford	Knutsford	
A5034	Near Mere, Cheshire		
A5035	Trentham	Longton	Originally ran along Hatherlow Lane near Stockport, now unclassified.
A5036	Switch Island	Toxteth (Brunswick railway station)	In 2 parts: Switch Island-Seaforth and Bootle-Brunswick due to Seaforth to Bootle section now forming part of Liverpool docks internal roads system.
A5037	Liverpool	Liverpool	
A5038	Liverpool	Litherland	It starts on Parliament Street, and passes Liverpool Lime Street railway station as Lime Street and the carries on to end as Netherton Way in Netherton.
A5039	Liverpool	Liverpool	Exists in two sections; the middle section though Liverpool city center is unclassified.
A5040	Liverpool	Liverpool	Paradise Street (part), plus short section of Old Haymarket on opposite side of pedestrianised city centre
A5041			Canning Place in Liverpool. Closed to general traffic; part converted into bus station.
A5042			Ran from the A5041 to A57 in Liverpool along South Castle and Castle streets. The section south of Derby Square is now gone, buried under the law courts and Chavasse Park; the section along Castle Street is probably part of the A5039.
A5043			Ran from the A5041 to A57 in Liverpool along South John and North John streets, paralleling the A5042.
A5044			Ran from Church Street (then A5039) via Ranelagh Street to A5038 in Liverpool, with a spur on Great Charlotte Street; the section west of Great Charlotte Street is now the B5339 while the remainder is probably now part of the A5038 (but still shown as the A5044 on the OS map).
A5045	Liverpool	Liverpool	Mann Island
A5046	Liverpool	Liverpool	Tithebarn Street
A5047	Liverpool	Old Swan	Edge Lane and St. Oswald's Street
A5048	Royal Liverpool University Hospital	Liverpool Women's Hospital	
A5049	Liverpool	Clubmoor	
A5050	Everton, Liverpool	Everton	St Domingo Road
A5051	Liverpool	Liverpool	Moorfields
A5052	Liverpool	Liverpool	King Edward Street
A5053	Liverpool	Liverpool	Leeds Street
A5054	Liverpool	Liverpool	Boundary Street
A5055	Liverpool	Liverpool	Sandhills Lane
A5056	Liverpool	Liverpool	Bankhall Street
A5057	Bootle	Bootle	
A5058	Bootle	Aigburth	Queens Drive
A5059			Ran between the-then A58 and A570 in St Helens along Corporation Street.
A5060	Warrington	Lower Walton	Chester Road
A5061	Warrington		Knutsford Road
A5062	Ashton-in-Makerfield		Only 0.1 mile long
A5063	Old Trafford	Salford	
A5064	Emstrey, near Shrewsbury	Shrewsbury	Named "London Road". Previously A5112, and A5 before that. Originally ran along Ordsall Lane in Salford between the A6 and A5063. Renumbered to the A5066 and B5461 in the 1960s.
A5065	Leagrave	Luton	Originally ran along the southern edge of Ordsall Park in Salford. Downgraded to the B5341 by the mid-1970s; much of the original route is now gone, now part of the park or due to redevelopment.
A5066	Ordsall	Lower Broughton	
A5067	Gorse Hill, Stretford	Manchester	
A5068	Skelmersdale	Skelmersdale	Originally ran from Cornbrook to Picadilly Gardens. Decommissioned when the A57(M) was built, splitting the route in two. The section north of Albion Street was renumbered to the A5103 while the section along Mosley Street was declassified.
A5069			Ran between the A58 and A6 in Westhoughton along Park Road. Became a part of the A58 in 1970 when it was rerouted due to extension of the M61.
A5070			Originally allocated to a loop off of the A59 through downtown Ornskirk. The A5070 was little more than an interim number pending the completion of the A59 bypass, after which it was downgraded to Class II status by 1926, possibly as B5319. Used a second time by 1926 from Hinckley to Stoney Bridge as an upgrade of the B579. The eastern section (along with the A46) was downgraded to the B4069 (now the B4669) due to completion of the M69. The remainder was downgraded in 1990 to the B4669 (an out-of-zone number as it is north of the A5) when the A47 Hinckley bypass opened.
A5071	Preston	Preston	Corporation Street / Moor Lane. Corporation Street was formerly a B road.
A5072	Preston	Preston	Strand Road
A5073	South Shore, Blackpool	Blackpool	
A5074	Gilpin Bridge	Windermere	
A5075	Ambleside	Ambleside	Some maps erroneously show the route as the A5095.
A5076	Upton	Kingsthorpe	Formerly part of the A45. The northeastern section was numbered A4508 (A45-A508 link) until the mid-1990s, when the route was renamed A5076. Previously allocated to a road from the A6 via Stricklandgate in Penrith; this became part of the A6 in a one-way pair.
A5077			Ran from Uttoxeter to the Uttoxeter bypass. After the A50 Uttoxeter bypass was built, the section running through Uttoxeter town center was renumbered: the section running towards Derby was renumbered as an extension of the A518, the section running towards Stoke-on-Trent was renumbered as an extension of the A5077 and the section running along Bradley Street was downgraded. The route is now part of an extended A522.
A5078	Crewe	Site of Crewe Locomotive Works	
A5079	Levenshulme	Longsight	
A5080	Liverpool	Penketh	May have also been used in Northampton as an upgrade of the B5347. The current number is debatable: A5080 is a duplicate number, and some maps indicate the route as part of the A5095. Official documents favor the A5080 number and signage is completely unhelpful.
A5081	M60 Junction 9	Old Trafford	Main Route through Trafford Park
A5082	Astley	Farnworth	
A5083	A582 near Lostock Hall,_{Lancashire}	A49 near Cuerden, Lancashire	
A5084	Lowick Green	Torver	
A5085	Ribbleton	Lea, Lancashire	Blackpool Road, Preston
A5086	Egremont	Cockermouth	
A5087	Ulverston	Barrow-in-Furness	
A5088	Birkenhead	Liscard	Originally used for the Watford Bypass, designated upon completion in the mid-1920s. It was later extended south to bypass Edgware and Cricklewood. Renumbered as a portion of a rerouted A500 in 1935 and then to the A41 in the 1950s, the road it bypassed in the first place.
A5089	Anfield	Newsham Park	Formerly also included more of Liverpool inner ring road, south to Toxteth and Dingle - now B roads
A5090	Litherland	Kirkdale	
A5091	Ullswater	Troutbeck	
A5092	Greenodd	Grizebeck	Originally used for the northern section of the Barnet Bypass (the southern section was the A5093). Renumbered to the A555 in 1935 and then to the A1 around 1954. Much of route now A1(M).
A5093	Hallthwaites	Whicham	Via Millom Originally used for the southern half of the Barnet Bypass. Renumbered to the A555 in 1935 and then to a rerouted A1 around 1954.
A5094	A595	A595	Via Whitehaven
A5095	Northampton	Northampton railway station	
A5096			Ran from the A447 west of Barwell to the A47 near Earl Shilton; originally a portion of the B581 when it was upgraded to Class I status. Declassified following the opening of the A47 Earl Shilton bypass. Number possibly used later in 1971–1972 on the former B582 between Oadby and the A46 (later shorted to Wigston). Route has since returned to the B582.
A5097			Ran from the A5039 to Crown Street (former A5048) in Liverpool along Myrtle Street.
A5098	Bootle	Walton	See Marsh Lane, Bootle.
A5099	Blackpool	Blackpool	

== Four-digit roads (51xx) ==
Road	From	To	Notes
A5100	Edgware	Mill Hill Circus	Station Road (Edgware), Hale Lane, Mill Hill Broadway
A5101	Northampton	Northampton	
A5102	Stockport	Wilmslow	Shares the same 1 mile stretch of road between Woodford and Bramhall Village with the A5149, where both diverge at each end
A5103	Manchester city centre	M56 J3 near Wythenshawe	Commonly referred to as the Princess Parkway, although this name only applies to the section between the M60 and the M56. The A5103 between the M60 and the city centre is actually Princess Road.
A5104	Corwen	Chester	Was the B5104 before it was upgraded. Originally proposed in 1935 as a renumbering of the eastern end of the A572 between Swinton and Worsley, because it ran parallel to the New Liverpool - East Lancashire Road (the A580). This renumbering never happened, and the route remains the A572. The A5104 was instead used to upgrade a B road with the same number in North Wales.
A5105	Morecambe	Bolton-le-Sands	
A5106	A6 near Chorley	A49 near Standish	
A5107			Ran from the A5039 Church Street to the A5038 Lime Street in Liverpool via Parker Street and Elliot Street. Now unclassified (except the eastern end, now part of a one-way loop on the A5038) and mostly pedestrianized.
A5108	Llanallgo	Moelfre	
A5109	Edgware	Whetstone	Includes the Western section of Deansbrook Lane and Deans Lane, Selvage Lane, then Marsh Lane, Totteridge Common and Totteridge Lane
A5110			Ran from Conwy to Tal-y-Cafn; former sections of B5106 (former B4407) and B5279. Designated after 1954 (not shown on the OS map that year) but before 1957 (first appeared on the OS maps). The sections got their numbers back before 1962 (number not shown on the map that year, but shown with their original numbers). It is not known why the A5110 even existed in the first place, given that one section is narrow and winding in places.
A5111	Mackworth	Spondon	Derby Outer Ring Road
A5112	Battlefield	Shrewsbury	Former portion of the A49. London Road, previously the former A5 between Emstrey and The Column, created when the original Shrewsbury bypass opened in 1933. Renumbered to A5064 in the 1970s when a new relief route was built around the east side of Shrewsbury; this route took over the A5112 number. It runs around the town centre, to the east.
A5113			Used for the original route of the A49 after the latter was rerouted further east. Downgraded to the B5476 in the 1970s.
A5114	A55	Llangefni	
A5115	Chester	Church Broughton	
A5116	Chester	Moston	
A5117	Helsby	A494 near Woodbank	
A5118	Penyffordd	Llong	
A5119	Mold	Flint	
A5120	M1 J12	Ampthill bypass	Section between Dunstable and the M1 downgraded to B5120
A5121	Branston	Clay Mills	
A5122			Ran from the-then terminus of the A55 (now J11) to the A5 Bangor bypass at what is now A55 J9; route was formerly a portion of the A5 and A487. Now part of the A5 and A487 again when the A55 was extended to Holyhead. Number also used along Farrar Street in Bangor, but is unknown if the two routes co-existed or not, as no number can be identified for Farrar Street when the A5122 was rerouted.
A5123	M1 J15A & A43	Northampton	
A5124	Battlefield	Broadoak	The current road was built in 1998, though the A5124 had a former route along Harlescott Lane, further towards the town centre of Shrewsbury. However, this road was too narrow, had a railway crossing and passed through a residential area. It is now unclassified.
A5125	Broad Street in Loughborough	The Rushes Loughborough	May not actually exist; the number does not appear in Leicester County Council documents, but it does appear in DfT traffic count data as well as on OS maps. But even these maps are confusing, as it shows the route running along Ashby Street and Ashby Square before ending at unclassified Swan Street, both narrow one-way streets. Google Maps and OpenStreetMap do not even show the number at all, claiming that the route is part of the A512. Previously allocated to a road from Braunstone to Abbey Park, bypassing Leicester to the east; this was the B583 before it was upgraded. Later became part of the A46 and is now unclassified except the northern end, which is now the B5327.
A5126	Runcorn		"Weston Link" - Links A533 and A557, a part of the Runcorn Expressways system
A5127	Birmingham	Lichfield	Former route of A38.
A5128	Wellingborough	Wilby	Was the A510 and A45 before the Wellingborough bypass was built.
A5129			Ran from the A6 in Kegworth to the A453 east of Isley Walton; originally B5400 when it was upgraded in 1971 or 1972 and rerouted following extension of the runway at East Midlands Airport in the 1960s (the old route crossed the current runway). Except for the eastern end (which is now unclassified), the route is now part of the A453.
A5130	M1 J14	Woburn	Former portion of the A50 between Newport Pagnell and Hockliffe. Declassified in 2017.
A5131			Ran along Saint Margaret's Way in Leicester from the A46 (now A594) to the A6 (now Loughborough Road). Now part of the A6, with the original route through Belgrave declassified.
A5132	Hilton	Swarkestone	
A5133			Was a road in Runcorn.
A5134	Elstow	Cardington	Presently being replaced by the Bedford Western Bypass. Originally began at Bronham; the section between Bronham and Elstow was declassified in December 2009 when the A428 Bedford Western and Northwest bypass opened, except for one section that is now the B560 and the section along Woburn Road that is now the B531. Some maps claim that the section east of the A600 is also unclassified.
A5135	Borehamwood	Borehamwood	
A5137	Heswall	Clatterbridge (M53 J4)	
A5139	Seacombe docks	M53 at Bidston	
A5140	Bedford	Bedford	
A5141	Bedford	Bedford	
A5142			Ran along Great Northern Road and Station Road from A5 (now A5183) to A505 in Dunstable. Declassified in the 1990s.
A5143	Hazel Grove	Bramhall Green	
A5144	Hale	Timperley	
A5145	Stockport	Stretford	
A5147	Maghull	Scarisbrick	It begins in Maghull, where it is called Liverpool Road North, then crosses over the Leeds and Liverpool Canal in Lydiate. It passes the Scotch Piper Inn before entering Lancashire at Downholland Cross. It crosses over the canal twice more, then proceeds onto Haskayne and Halsall before terminating in Scarisbrick. The road was built entirely to single carriageway standard.
A5148	Lichfield	Lichfield	Short spur connecting A38 at Swinfen Island to M6 Toll/A5 at Wall Island. When first built formed part of the A38 until that was rerouted via the route of the A446.
A5149	Poynton	Cheadle, Greater Manchester	Shares the same 1 mile stretch of road between Woodford and Bramhall Village with the A5102, where both diverge at each end
A5150	Colindale	Hendon	Colindeep Lane
A5151	Lloc	Rhuddlan	
A5152	Gaerwen	A55 near Gaerwen	Partly follows former route of A483 in Wrexham. Originally formed entire inner ring road but part now downgraded to B5446.
A5152	A55 J7	A5	Short link road in Anglesey. Duplicate number.
A5153	Holyhead	Holyhead	
A5154	Holyhead Port	Holyhead	
A5156	A483 North Wrexham	A534 Northeast Wrexham	Known as the Llan-y-pwll Link Road
A5159			Typo for the A5195 southeast of the M6; corrected in 2009.
A5160			Proposed in 1935 to be reserved to form part of a Swindon-East Anglia route together with the A4160 (itself reserved to upgrade the B489 to Class I). But the tonnage was not enough (and likely would never be) on the B489 to upgrade it to Class I, so the proposal fell through. Instead, the A505 was extended over the A601, replacing the A5160.
A5181	Stretford	Trafford Park	
A5182	Acton	Clayton	Was the B5038.
A5183	Dunstable	M1 J4	The A5 before it was de-trunked.
A5184	Longsight	University of Manchester	
A5185	Eccles	Swinton	
A5186	Salford	Salford	Was the B5227.
A5187	Stafford	Stafford	Part of the Stafford ring road
A5188			Penwortham Bypass Flyover from A59 to A582 south of Preston; it is unknown if this road was actually signed or it was a planned route number that was never implemented.
A5189	Burton upon Trent	Burton upon Trent	Uses St Peter's Bridge, connects A444 to A5121.
A5190	Lichfield	Cannock	Most of the route was part of the B5012 until the 1970s when it was upgraded. Replaced the partly constructed Chasetown Ring Road of which only one section had been built.
A5191	Shrewsbury	Shrewsbury	
A5192	Lichfield	Lichfield	
A5193	Wellingborough	Wellingborough	Was the A509 before it was rerouted onto the Wellingborough western bypass
A5194	Derby city center	Wilmorton, Derby	Designated 2007, unsigned; was part of the A6 before it was rerouted onto the Pride Parkway. What the road was between the A6 rerouting (late 1990s or early 2000s) and its official designation in 2007 is not known.
A5195	Brownhills	Chasetown	
A5196	A5061 at Bridge Foot, Warrington	A5060 in Warrington	Warrington bypass, opened in 2021.
A5199	Leicester	Kingsthorpe	Was the A50 and the B568 before that.

== Four-digit roads (52xx) ==
Road	From	To	Notes
A5200	Holborn	Tufnell Park	York Way
A5201	Bloomsbury	Shoreditch	
A5202	St Pancras	Camden	Mostly split into two one-way streets, St Pancras Way and Royal College Street. Southern section used to meet the Euston Road but now runs along Goods Way.
A5203	Kings Cross	Holloway	
A5204	A5	Tottenham Court Road	
A5205	Maida Vale	Camden Town	The road can be used as a northern bypass to the London Inner Ring Road between the Edgware Road and Great Portland Street section, and is often a much faster route than the A501 in this section.
A5206	A38 near Lichfield	Lichfield	
A5207	M57 J4 at Randles Farm	A5208 at Knowsley Business Park	Another one coexisted from the A59 in Aintree to the A565 in Thornton. Downgraded to the B5207 (another duplicated number) in 2015 when the A5758 (which paralleled the A5207 to the north) opened.
A5208	Kirkby	A580	
A5209	Standish	Burscough	
A5219			Typo for the B5219.
A5223	Horsehay, Telford	Shawbirch, A442	Originally used from the A5 Holyhead Road via Wellington town centre to the A442 Whitchurch Road; formerly the B5061 before it was upgraded. Declassified before 1982.
A5225			Proposed in 1993 from the M6 at Orrell to the M61 near J5; this scheme was withdrawn in 1996. Later proposed in 2003 as a scaled-down plan from the M6 to the A579; this scheme was also withdrawn. A further scaled-down plan from the A49 to the B5238 in Wigan started construction in 2018, and will later extend west to the M6. It is unknown if the road will be given this number or not.
A5227	Birkenhead	Birkenhead	Borough Road East flyover between A41 and A552
A5228	Luton	Luton	
A5229			Ran from the A505 to the A6 in Luton; declassified around 1987.
A5230	Mereside	Blackpool Beach	Known as the Squires Gate Link Road, this links the M55 with Blackpool Airport and the southern end of the Promenade. Partly follows former alignment of Blackpool Branch Line.
A5250	A38 near Littleover	Derby	Old A38
A5266			Ran from the A5 (now B5061) to Wellington Road (former A518) in Telford; south of St Georges was part of the A5 and later the B5060 (the entire route became B5060 when St Georges was bypassed)
A5267	Birkdale	Churchtown	
A5268	Chester Inner Ring Road		
A5270	Buxton	Buxton	
A5271	East Keswick	North Keswick	Unrelated to the Tunstall A5271
A5271	Wolstanton	Tunstall	Unrelated to the Keswick A5271
A5272	Weston Coyney	Great Chell	
A5275	A562 in Speke	A561 in Speke	
A5276			Ran from the A5036 east of Netherton to the A565 in Thorton; formerly the B5194. Became the B5207 when the eastern half was bypassed.
A5280	Warrington	Warrington	New road west of Warrington, created 2017.
A5281	Warrington	Warrington	New road west of Warrington, created 2017.
A5282	Warrington	Warrington	New road west of Warrington, created 2017.
A5284	A591 junction, north end of Kendal Bypass	Kendal	Original route of the A591 out of Kendal; upgraded from the B5284.
A5288	A518 Newport Road	A34 Foregate Street	Stafford Western Access Route, created in 2021.

== Four-digit roads (53xx to 57xx) ==
Road	From	To	Notes
A5300	M57 / M62 junction	A562 between Halewood and Widnes	Commonly known as Knowsley Expressway
A5301			Used for the south Nantwich bypass. Became a portion of the A530 mainline in the 2000s when all Class I roads were moved out of the centre of Nantwich. The former A530 is now the B5341, local streets, and the B5334.
A5365	A34 in Lower Heath	A536 Congleton bypass	Opened 2021; old routing of the A536 before it was rerouted onto the bypass.
A5460	M1 / M69 at J21	Leicester Inner ring road _{A594 (Leicester)}	Was originally part of the A46 and A46(M).
A5480	A548 in Chester	A5116 in Chester	A link road built to improve access to retail areas on the A548, hence the number.
A5505	M1 J11A	Dunstable	Woodside Link
A5509	Northwich inner ring road		was part of the B5337 until 2011.
A5523			Typo for the A5223.
A5630	Anstey	A563	Leicester Ring Road to Leicester Western Bypass/Anstey link road
A5739	A579 Winwick Lane	A573 Parkside Road	Parkside Link Road East, opened in 2025.
A5758	Aintree	Thornton	Replacement of parallel A5207 (now B5207).
