= Listed buildings in Congleton =

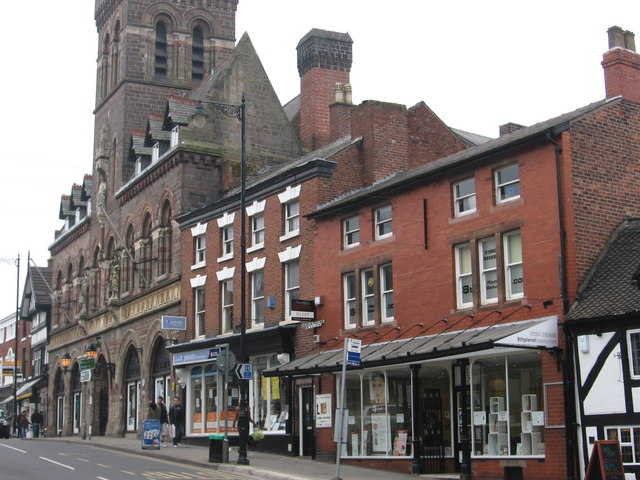
High Street, Congleton

Congleton is a civil parish in Cheshire East, England. It contains 133 buildings that are recorded in the National Heritage List for England as designated listed buildings. Of these, one is listed at Grade I, the highest grade, four are listed at Grade II*, the middle grade, and the others are at Grade II. The parish contains the town of Congleton, and surrounding countryside. Passing through the parish are the Macclesfield Canal and the River Dane, and a number of listed structures are associated with these waterways. The silk and cotton weaving industries came to the town from the 18th century, and there are listed buildings associated with these, including mills and weavers' cottages. Otherwise the listed buildings include houses and cottages in the town and the country, churches and associated structures, shops, schools, a town hall, offices, and public houses. Some of the buildings date from the 16th and 17th centuries, and are timber-framed. The great majority of houses are from the late 18th and early 19th centuries, reflecting the industrial growth and prosperity in the town at this time.

== Key ==
Grade	Criteria
I	Buildings of exceptional interest, sometimes considered to be internationally important
II*	Particularly important buildings of more than special interest
II	Buildings of national importance and special interest

== Buildings ==
Name and location	Photograph	Date	Notes	Grade
Fragment of a plague cross 53.15487°N 2.23219°W	—	1559 or later	The fragment of the plague cross consists of a square stone shaft on a stone base. Its date is uncertain, but the first major outbreak of plague in the town was in 1559.	II
Big Fenton; 53.17992°N 2.15119°W	—	16th to 17th century	A timber-framed farmhouse with brick and plastered infill and a tiled roof. The house has a T-shaped plan, and the windows are casements. Inside the farmhouse is a confessional closet and a chapel with painted inscriptions on the walls.	II*
Ye Olde White Lion Public House; 53.16276°N 2.21112°W		16th to 17th century	A timber-framed public house in two storeys with two jettied gables, the left gable being the larger. The windows are mullioned and transomed and contain casements. The roof at the front has stone slates, and at the rear is tiled.	II
6–10 Little Street; 53.16328°N 2.21439°W		Late 16th to early 17th century	Originally three timber-framed cottages on a stone plinth, they were later roughcast and painted. They are in a single storey with attics, and have slate roofs. In the attics are gabled dormers containing casements. In the ground floor are shop fronts. As of 2022 the building is occupied by a café/bar.	II
1 Wagg Street; 53.16314°N 2.21457°W		Late 16th to early 17th century	The oldest part is the rear wing, which is timber-framed with brick and plastered infill. The wing facing the street is in brick. The whole building is in two storeys, and has a slate roof.	II
Crossley Hall; 53.18183°N 2.16329°W	—	Late 16th to early 17th century	A timber-framed house with gabled cross-wings and stone-slate roofs. The infill is mainly with brick, although there is some wattle and daub, and some applied timber-framing. The windows are 18th-century casements. At the sides of the house are massive stone chimney stacks.	II
7 High Street; 53.16294°N 2.21094°W		17th century	A shop, basically timber-framed, the exterior later covered in applied timber framing. It is in two storeys with an attic, the upper storey and the attic being jettied. In the upper storey is an oriel window containing a casement. The ground floor has a modern shop window.	II
16–20 High Street; 53.16273°N 2.21094°W		17th century	Three shops, basically timber-framed, but with roughcast and stuccoed exteriors and shop fronts. They are in two storeys, no. 18 also with a gabled attic. The other two shops have gabled upper storeys, the bargeboard of no. 16 being plain, and that of no. 20 being ornamental and with a finial. In the passage between nos. 18 and 20 is exposed timber-framing.	II
42 High Street; 53.16277°N 2.21207°W		17th century (probable)	A timber-framed shop, now stuccoed and much altered. It is in two storeys with an oriel window in the gable. The ground floor contains a modern shop window.	II
28 and 28A Lawton Street; 53.16271°N 2.20870°W		17th century (probable)	A timber-framed building, later roughcast, with a stone-slate roof. It is in two storeys and has a two-bay front, the right bay being gabled. In the ground floor are modern shop windows, and above are casement windows.	II
8–12 Moody Street; 53.16214°N 2.21260°W		17th century (probable)	A row of three basically timber-framed houses, with later applied timber framing. The panels are plastered, and the houses stand on a stone plinth. No. 8 has a gable with scalloped bargeboards, and a canted bay window. To the right of this house is a covered way. The windows are casements.	II
Lion and Swan Inn; 53.16315°N 2.21488°W		17th century	The public house may have an earlier core. It is basically timber-framed on a high sandstone plinth, with later alterations, including applied timber framing to the front. The sides and back are in brick, The building is in two storeys and has three gables on the front. In the centre is a porch carried on Tuscan columns, and the doorway is approached by steps. Most of the windows are sashes. The roof is partly in slate, partly in stone slate, and partly tiled.	II
Ye Olde King's Arms public house 53.16285°N 2.21022°W		17th century (probable)	A timber-framed public house with stuccoed brick infill and a tiled roof. It consists of a hall and a cross-wing and is in two storeys. The windows are casements. There is a single-storey extension on the right side.	II
White Gables, Holmhurst, and The Lowe; 53.17519°N 2.17739°W	—	Mid-17th century (probable)	Originally a timber-framed house, Lowe House, it was extended in about 1835, incorporating timber framing, and converted into three dwellings. The building is stuccoed, and in two storeys. Its features include gables, all with ornamental bargeboards, and some with iron finials.	II
43 Lawton Street; 53.16251°N 2.20780°W		1671	A timber-framed house with plaster infill and a slate roof. It is in two storeys. To the left of the doorway is an oriel bow window. The other windows are casements. Stone steps lead up to the doorway.	II
5 and 7 Chapel Street; 53.16230°N 2.21105°W		Late 17th to early 18th century	A pair of brick houses, possibly originally one house, with a stone-slate roof. It is in two storeys. The windows are mullioned and transomed, and contain casements. In the centre of the building is a small gable containing a circular window.	II
31 Lawton Street; 53.16252°N 2.20844°W		Late 17th to early 18th century	A narrow three-storey brick house on a rendered plinth with a slate roof. The windows are casements.	II
Anfield House; 53.16393°N 2.21765°W		Late 17th or early 18th century	A brick house with stone quoins and a slate roof. It has two storeys with an attic, and is in two bays. The windows are sashes. The doorway is on the right side and has a doorcase with pilasters.	II
Tan House Farmhouse; 53.16327°N 2.15936°W		1714	The farmhouse was partly rebuilt in the late 18th to early 19th century. It has an L-shaped plan; the main block is in brick on a stone plinth with three storeys, and the stone rear wing is in two storeys. The windows are casements. On the corners are rusticated quoins, and the doorway has a rusticated stone surround.	II
19 Lawton Street; 53.16255°N 2.20928°W		Early 18th century	A brick house with a slate roof in four storeys with a two-bay front. There are string courses between the storeys. The lower three storeys contain sash windows with fluted keystones. The windows in the top floor are casements in gabled half-dormers with bargeboards. On the right is a two-storey 19th-century extension.	II
Buglawton Hall; 53.17711°N 2.17310°W	—	Early 18th century	The house absorbed an earlier 16th or 17th century house. In the 19th century its exterior was stoccoed and castellated, and later it was extended. The house is constructed in brick on a stone plinth, with a half-timbered core. It is in two storeys, with a three-bay front. The house has since been used as a school. Brick and stone outbuildings are included in the designation.	II
St Peter's Church; 53.16175°N 2.21147°W		1740–42	The church replaced an earlier church on the site, and its tower was completed in 1786. Additions were made in 1839–40. The tower is in stone with, at the top, a parapet containing blind arcading and crocketed pinnacles. The body of the church is in brick with stone dressings and a stone-slate roof in Neoclassical style, Along the sides are two tiers of windows, the upper ones round-headed, and the lower ones with segmental heads. At the east end is a Venetian window. Inside the church are galleries on three sides, box pews, a finely carved reredos, and paintings of Saint Peter and Saint Paul by Edward Penny.	I
52 High Street; 53.16288°N 2.21254°W		18th century	The building may have an earlier core. It is a roughcast shop with a slate roof in three storeys with a two-bay front. The ground floor contains modern shop fronts, and the windows above are sashes.	II
Buckingham House; 53.16351°N 2.21544°W		Mid-18th century	A brick house with a hipped slate roof. Originally with two storeys, a third was added later. It has a three-bay front, and the windows are sashes. The central doorway has a rusticated stone surround and a pediment. At the sides of the house are quoins. At the rear is a later single-storey extension.	II
Overton House; 53.16457°N 2.21926°W		Mid-18th century	A brick house on a stone plinth with stone dressings and a green slate roof. It is in three storeys, and has a five-bay front. There are stone quoins at the angles of the house and flanking the central bay. The windows are sashes. There are pediments over the doorway, over the window above, and at the top of the central bay.	II*
Gates and gate piers, Overton House; 53.16445°N 2.21935°W		Mid-18th century	There are two pairs of piers. Those flanking the gates are in stone with cornices and urn finials. At the end of the garden walls, the piers are in brick with stone cornices and caps. The gates are in wrought iron.	II*
Holmefield, 8 Chapel Street; 53.16207°N 2.21114°W		Mid- to late 18th century	A brick house with stone dressings on a stone plinth with a slate roof. It is in three storeys and has a five-bay front. The windows are sashes. The doorcase has pilasters and an elliptical fanlight, and in front of it is a porch carried on iron columns.	II
Chapel House; 53.16203°N 2.21162°W		Late 18th century	Originally a house, this is in brick with slate roofs. The central block is in three storeys, on the right is a wing with a canted end in two storeys, and to the left is a later block, also in two storeys. The windows are sashes. The doorway has a stone surround with Doric 3/4 columns, a frieze and a pediment.	II
23 Lawton Street; 53.16254°N 2.20889°W		Late 18th century	A brick house with a slate roof. It is in three storeys and has a four-bay front. The windows are sashes with stuccoed lintels. The central door has a moulded surround and a fanlight containing fretwork.	II
33 Lawton Street; 53.16251°N 2.20832°W		Late 18th century	A brick house on a rendered plinth with a slate roof. It is in three storeys and has a three-bay front. In the centre is a doorcase with pilasters, a pediment, and a semicircular fanlight. The windows are sashes.	II
6 Moody Street; 53.16229°N 2.21251°W		Late 18th century	A brick house on a stone plinth with a slate roof. It is in two storeys, and has a three-bay front. The windows are sashes with keystones, flat brick arches and stone sills. The central doorway has fluted pilasters and a semicircular fanlight.	II
14 Moody Street; 53.16204°N 2.21262°W		Late 18th century	A brick house on a stone plinth with a slate roof. It is in two storeys with an attic, and has a three-bay front. The windows are sashes, and in the attic are three dormers with bargeboards. The central doorway has fluted pilasters.	II
25–31 Moody Street; 53.16149°N 2.21314°W		Late 18th century	A row of four stuccoed houses, possibly originally one building, with prominent quoins. The roofs are in stone-slate and slate. There are three storeys and a four-bay front, the lateral bays projecting forward. In the centre of the building is the doorway to no. 27, which has a porch carried on plain Doric columns. The doorways to nos. 25 and 27 have fluted pilasters. The doorway to no. 31 is on the left side; it has fluted pilasters and a semicircular fanlight. The lateral bays have single-storey canted bay windows with balconies above. In the first floor the central window and the windows above the balconies are casements; the others are sashes.	II
12, 12A and 12B West Street; 53.16325°N 2.21580°W		Late 18th century	A row of three stuccoed houses with slate roofs. No 12 has three storeys, and is in three bays. It has a porch carried on Doric columns and pilasters. At the rear of the house is a two-storey circular bay window. The houses to the right are in two storeys. All the windows are sashes.	II
29 and 29A West Street; 53.16373°N 2.21675°W		Late 18th century	Two brick houses with slate roofs. No 29 is in three storeys and has a three-bay front and a stone parapet cornice. No 29A is a two-storey single-bay wing. The windows are sashes.	II
2–4 Mill Street; 53.16398°N 2.21463°W		Late 18th century	Originally one house, later converted into a shop and a hotel. It is in three storeys, and has a front of five bays. The building is in brick, the right three bays being stuccoed. Between the two sections is a round-arched entrance, and to the left is a modern shop front. The middle bay of the right section contains a doorcase with pilasters, a cornice and a fanlight. The windows are sashes.	II
Danesford School; 53.16526°N 2.22505°W	—	Late 18th century	This originated as West House, a house in Georgian style. It later became Danesford School, for which a wing in similar style was added about 1920, and after that the building was converted into flats. The building is in brick with slate roofs. The windows are sashes. Other features include a two-storey semicircular bay window on the east front, and a large pediment on the south front.	II
Flint Mill; 53.16968°N 2.20306°W		Late 18th century	This was used as a water-powered silk mill and a flint grinding mill. It is constructed in sandstone and brick with Welsh slate roofs. It has a square plan, and is in three storeys with an attic. On the river side is a breast shot waterwheel about 18 feet (5.5 m) in diameter with cast iron buckets. In the top floor are sash windows with wedge lintels. Inside is a complete set of flint grinding machinery.	II
Ivy Cottage; 53.16447°N 2.22109°W	—	Late 18th century	A brick house with a slate roof in two storeys with an attic and a front of three bays. The windows are sashes. The central doorway has panelled and reeded pilasters and a pediment. At the ends are gables, each containing an arched window.	II
Moody Hall; 53.16220°N 2.21310°W		Late 18th century	A brick house with a slate roof in three storeys and with a three-bay front. In the right bay is a single-storey canted bay window. The windows are sashes. The central doorway has Doric pilasters, a pediment and a fanlight. Both the doorway and the bay window have triglyph friezes. To the left is a range of brick outbuildings.	II
Woodlands; 53.16509°N 2.22286°W	—	Late 18th century	This originated as Mortlake House, was later used as a children's home, and then converted into flats. It is built in brick on a stone plinth, and has a hipped slate roof. The house is in two storeys, and has a front of five bays. At the east end is a two-storey semicircular bay. The windows are sashes, and the porch is carried on Roman Doric columns.	II
Brook Mills; 53.16542°N 2.21296°W		1785	A group of silk mills, extended in 1835, built in brick with slate roofs. The original mill is in four storeys, the later mill had five storeys. There was also a full-height latrine tower. Included in the designated are railings, perimeter walls and gate piers. The 5 storey Mill was demolished in 2019.	II
8 Biddulph Road; 53.15715°N 2.19169°W		Late 18th to early 19th century	A stone cottage with a tiled roof. It is in two storeys, and contains sash windows. The attached painted screen wall incorporating a doorway is included in the designation.	II
6 Chapel Street; 53.16220°N 2.21094°W		Late 18th to early 19th century	A brick house with a slate roof, it is in two storeys and has a three-bay front. The windows are sashes with brick arches and stone sills. The central raised doorway is approached by stone steps. It has a doorcase with pilasters, an open pediment, and an elliptical fanlight.	II
9 High Street; 53.16291°N 2.21103°W		Late 18th to early 19th century	A brick shop in three storeys and two bays with a modern shop front. The windows in the upper storeys are sashes under flat brick arches.	II
16–20 Rood Hill; 53.16732°N 2.21388°W		Late 18th to early 19th century	A row of roughcast brick houses with tiled roofs in three storeys. Most of the windows are sashes, and in the top storey long weavers' windows have been retained.	II
Beech House; 53.16927°N 2.19930°W	—	Late 18th to early 19th century	The house originated as a vicarage. It is in brick on a stone plinth, and has three storeys. The windows are sashes. In front of the central doorway is a flat-roofed porch carried on Doric columns.	II
Railway Station Hotel; 53.15701°N 2.19273°W		Late 18th to early 19th century	A public house in painted stone with tiled roofs with two storeys. An extension was added to the left later in the 19th century. The original part has two sash windows in the upper storey, and a crow stepped gable on the right side. Behind this is a wing with a castellated parapet.	II
Throstle's Nest House; 53.16957°N 2.20087°W	—	Late 18th to early 19th century	A stuccoed house in Georgian style with a hipped slate roof. It is in three storeys, and has a three-bay front. The windows in the ground floor are casements and in the middle floor are sash windows in semicircular-headed recesses. There is a central doorway with pilasters and a cornice.	II
Congleton Chronicle Office; 53.16292°N 2.21113°W		c. 1800	A brick building with a slate roof in three storeys with an L-shaped plan. The front on High Street has a modern shop front in the ground floor. In the middle floor is a Venetian window with Tuscan pilasters, and a sash window. There are two sash windows in the top floor. The other front facing Market Square is in three bays. It contains a semicircular-headed doorway, and sash windows with channelled lintels.	II
Mossley Hall; 53.15114°N 2.18149°W		c. 1800	A large brick house with a slate roof. It has a square plan, is in three storeys, and has a front of five bays. There is a stuccoed Roman Doric porch, and the windows are sashes. On the left side is a bay with a cornice surmounted by urns. There are two later wings on the right side.	II
The Laurels; 53.15744°N 2.20233°W	—	c. 1810	A brick house on a stone plinth with a green slate roof. It is in two storeys and has a three-bay front. The wooden doorcase has pilasters and a fanlight, and in front of it is a portico with Tuscan columns. On the south side of the house is a two-storey canted bay window. In the gabled ends are small semicircular windows.	II
Bradshaw House; 53.16254°N 2.20911°W		1820	A brick house in Georgian style with a slate roof. It is in two storeys and has a front of five bays. The windows are sashes with flat brick arches and stone sills. The central doorway has a semicircular head and a radial fanlight. At the top of the house is a parapet with a modillion cornice. In front of the house is a perron with a double flight of steps, and wrought iron railings.	II
Bath House, Bradshaw House; 53.16181°N 2.20875°W		c. 1820	The bath house is in the grounds of Bradshaw House. It is built in brick with a pyramidal hipped slate roof. The bath house has two storeys, it is in one bay, and it has a square plan. The bath is in the lower storey, it measures 10 feet (3.0 m) square, and six stone steps lead down to the bottom. In the upper floor are blocked fireplaces. Two steps on the east side lead down into the bath chamber, and five steps on the south side lead to the upper floor. The windows are sashes.	II
Garden shelter, Bradshaw House; 53.16185°N 2.20895°W		c. 1820	A pavilion in the garden of Bradshaw House, it is built in stone and brick, and is in Neoclassical style. It has an apsidal plan, and has a pediment carried on Doric Columns and pilasters. It has an arched opening with a keystone carved with a Grecian head.	II
3 Chapel Street; 53.16238°N 2.21087°W		Early 19th century	A brick house with a slate roof in two storeys and with a seven-bay front. The windows are sashes with brick arches and stone sills. The wooden doorcase has pilasters, and an elliptical fanlight.	II
5 High Street; 53.16288°N 2.21051°W		Early 19th century	A brick shop with a slate roof in three storeys with a four-bay front. The ground floor contains a modern shop front. The windows above are sashes with keystones and grooved lintels.	II
8–12 High Street; 53.16271°N 2.21046°W		Early 19th century	A row of three brick shops with stone dressings and slate roofs, all with modern shop fronts. Nos 8 and 10 are in two storeys with an attic, and No 12 is in three storeys. The windows in the upper storeys are sashes. No 10 has a wooden moulded doorcase with pilasters, a fanlight, and an open pediment. The attic windows in Nos 8 and 10 are in gabled dormers.	II
26 High Street; 53.16279°N 2.21130°W		Early 19th century	A brick shop with a slate roof. It is in three storeys and has a four-bay front. There is a modern shop front, and above are sash windows with fluted keystones. Between the middle and top storeys is a stone band. The deep eaves have modillions.	II
28–32 High Street; 53.16280°N 2.21151°W		Early 19th century	Three brick shops with a slate roof. They are in three storeys and have a five-bay front. In the ground floor are modern shop fronts and a passageway. The first floor contains five sash windows.	II
25 Lawton Street; 53.16256°N 2.20870°W		Early 19th century	A brick building with a slate roof, it is in two storeys, and has a four-bay front. In the ground floor are a modern shop window and a segmental-headed archway. The windows are sashes.	II
12 Little Street; 53.16324°N 2.21449°W		Early 19th century (probable)	The shop may have an earlier core. It is built in brick with a slate roof. It is in two storeys with a gable. In the lower floor is a modern shop doorway and a bow window, and above is a casement window.	II
82–90 Mill Street; 53.16638°N 2.21309°W		Early 19th century	A row of brick houses with slate roofs. They are in three storeys. In the ground floor are four plain doorways, a shop front, and three casement windows. There are four similar windows in the middle floor. The top floor contains a three-light casement on the left, and three long five-light windows for fabric workers.	II
13–23 Moody Street; 53.16177°N 2.21306°W	—	Early 19th century	A range of houses in Georgian and Regency styles. They are stuccoed with slate roofs. The houses are in three storeys, they all have doorcases with pilasters and fanlights, and some have pediments. There are three canted bay windows. Most of the windows are sashes, and some are casements.	II
9 Park Street; 53.16361°N 2.20886°W		Early 19th century	A brick house, later used as Social Services office, with a hipped slate roof in two storeys. The wooden doorcase has pilasters, an open pediment and a radial fanlight. The windows are sashes with brick arches and stone sills.	II
3–15 Swan Bank; 53.16349°N 2.21459°W		Early 19th century	A row of brick shops in two and three storeys. On the ground floor are modern shop fronts, and above are sash windows with flat brick arches and stone sills.	II
12 and 14 Swan Bank; 53.16360°N 2.21482°W		Early 19th century	A brick building on a stone plinth, in three storeys with a five-bay front. In the centre is a rusticated archway. This is flanked by modern shop fonts and doorways with semicircular fanlights. The windows are sashes with brick arches and stone sills.	II
2 and 3 The Vale; 53.16128°N 2.21320°W	—	Early 19th century	A pair of brick Georgian houses with slate roofs. The windows are sashes with flat brick arches and stone sills. The centre two bays project forward, with a pediment containing a circular window. The wooden doorways have pilasters and pediments.	II
100 West Road; 53.16458°N 2.22625°W	—	Early 19th century	A brick house with a slate roof, it is in two storeys and has a three-bay front. The house has a semicircular doorway with Ionic pilasters and a radial fanlight. The windows are sashes.	II
7–11 West Street; 53.16349°N 2.21583°W		Early 19th century	A row of three-storey houses. The ground floor is in rusticated stone, and the upper storeys are in brick. The roof is slated. The windows are sashes, and the doorways have fanlights.	II
11A West Street; 53.16378°N 2.21565°W	—	Early 19th century	This originated as the coach house to No. 11 West Street. It is constructed in brick with a tiled roof, and is in two storeys. In the ground floor are four round-headed windows and a doorway. Elsewhere are pitch holes and casement windows. Outside the building is a stone mounting block.	II
44 West Street; 53.16371°N 2.21710°W		Early 19th century	A brick house with a slate roof, which may have an earlier core. It is in two storeys, and has a three-bay front. In the ground floor are two sash windows. The other window in the ground floor, and those in the upper floor, are casements. The door has a simple doorcase with pilasters.	II
50 West Street; 53.16388°N 2.21754°W		Early 19th century	A brick shop with a slate roof. It is in two storeys, with modern shop fronts in the ground floor. The upper floor has four sash windows. At the rear is a canted bay window and more sashes.	II
Parkleigh; 53.16198°N 2.20388°W	—	Early 19th century	A brick house with a slate roof, it is in three storeys and has a three-bay front. The lower storeys protrudes forward, and contains doorway with a semicircular head. The windows are sashes.	II
Pedley Lane Top; 53.17059°N 2.15097°W	—	Early 19th century	A stone cottage with a thatched roof in two storeys with casement windows. To the right is a single-storey extension, and on the left is a lean-to outbuilding.	II
Salford Mill; 53.16749°N 2.21354°W		Early 19th century	Originally a silk mill, this is built on sloping ground, with three storeys at the front, and two storeys and a basement at the rear. It is built in brick with a hipped slate roof. The buildings has a front of eleven bays, and a small pediment in the centre containing a clock. The windows are small-paned, with stone lintels and sills.	II
St Mary's Church; 53.16445°N 2.22263°W		1826	A Roman Catholic church designed by John Hall, a priest. It is built in brick on a stone plinth with a slate roof. The church is in two storeys, and has an entrance front facing the road. This contains a doorway with a semicircular head and a fanlight. It is flanked by windows, and above it is a pediment with a niche containing a statue of the Virgin Mary. The east end is slightly polygonal, and all the windows have semicircular heads. The attached presbytery is included in the designation.	II
Bridge No. 63; 53.18425°N 2.17293°W		c. 1827	An accommodation bridge over the Macclesfield Canal, it was designed by William Crosley, and is built in sandstone. The bridge has a horseshoe elliptical arch with voussoirs and a prominent keystone. The walls end in square piers.	II
Bridge No. 64; 53.18150°N 2.17933°W		c. 1827	An accommodation bridge over the Macclesfield Canal, it was designed by William Crosley, and is built in sandstone. The bridge has a horseshoe elliptical arch with voussoirs and a prominent keystone. The walls end in square piers.	II
Bridge No. 66; 53.17609°N 2.18741°W		c. 1827	An accommodation bridge over the Macclesfield Canal, it was designed by William Crosley, and is built in sandstone. The bridge has a horseshoe elliptical arch with voussoirs and a prominent keystone. The walls end in square piers.	II
Bridge No. 67; 53.17418°N 2.18625°W		c. 1827	An accommodation bridge over the Macclesfield Canal, it was designed by William Crosley, and is built in sandstone. The bridge has a horseshoe elliptical arch with voussoirs and a prominent keystone. The walls end in square piers.	II
Bridge No. 69; 53.17010°N 2.18394°W		c. 1827	An accommodation bridge over the Macclesfield Canal, it was designed by William Crosley, and is built in sandstone. The bridge has a horseshoe elliptical arch with voussoirs and a keystone. The walls end in square piers.	II
Bridge No. 70; 53.16595°N 2.18162°W		c. 1827	An accommodation bridge over the Macclesfield Canal, it was designed by William Crosley, and is built in sandstone. The bridge has a horseshoe elliptical arch with voussoirs and a keystone. The walls end in square piers.	II
Bridge No. 72; 53.16096°N 2.17961°W		c. 1827	An accommodation bridge carrying Brookhouse Lane over the Macclesfield Canal, it was designed by William Crosley, and is built in sandstone. The bridge has a horseshoe elliptical arch with voussoirs and a keystone. The walls end in square piers.	II
Canal distance marker 53.18380°N 2.16823°W	—	c. 1827	The distance marker by the towpath of the Macclesfield Canal is constructed in sandstone and has a shaped top. It is marked on the east side with 1/2 and on the west side with 3/4. The numbers are enclosed in a painted rectangle.	II
Canal milestone 53.17103°N 2.18458°W		c. 1827	The milestone by the towpath of the Macclesfield Canal is constructed in sandstone and has a shaped top. The faces are inscribed with the distances in miles to Marple and to Hall Green.	II
Canal milestone 53.18227°N 2.17815°W		c. 1827	The milestone by the towpath of the Macclesfield Canal is constructed in sandstone and has a shaped top. The faces are inscribed with the distances in miles to Marple and to Hall Green.	II
Canal milestone 53.15796°N 2.18308°W		c. 1827	The milestone by the towpath of the Macclesfield Canal is constructed in sandstone and has a shaped top. The faces are inscribed with the distances in miles to Marple and to Hall Green.	II
National Sunday School; 53.16188°N 2.21184°W		1828	The former Sunday School is in brick with stone dressings on a stone plinth and has a slate roof. It is in two storeys, the original part having seven bays. The central three bays project slightly forward under a pediment. To the left of this is a two-bay extension containing a doorway. And further to the left of this is a lower two-bay extension. The windows are sashes.	II
Biddulph Valley Aqueduct; 53.15984°N 2.18001°W		c. 1830	The aqueduct carries the Macclesfield Canal over a former mineral railway, and was designed by William Crosley. It consists of sandstone abutments and a cast iron trough. There is a single round-headed arch over the railway, with voussoirs and a keystone.	II
Bridge No. 57; 53.18361°N 2.14341°W		c. 1830	An accommodation bridge over the Macclesfield Canal, it was designed by William Crosley, and is built in sandstone. The bridge has a horseshoe elliptical arch with voussoirs and a keystone. The walls end in square piers.	II
Bridge No. 59; 53.18395°N 2.15302°W		c. 1830	An accommodation bridge over the Macclesfield Canal, it was designed by William Crosley, and is built in sandstone. The bridge has a horseshoe elliptical arch with voussoirs and a keystone. The walls end in square piers.	II
Bridge No. 60; 53.18249°N 2.16192°W		c. 1830	An accommodation bridge over the Macclesfield Canal, it was designed by William Crosley, and is built in sandstone. The bridge has a horseshoe elliptical arch with voussoirs and a keystone. The walls end in square piers.	II
Bridge No. 62; 53.18336°N 2.16686°W		c. 1830	An accommodation bridge over the Macclesfield Canal, it was designed by William Crosley, and is built in sandstone. The bridge has a horseshoe elliptical arch with voussoirs and a keystone. The walls end in square piers.	II
Canal distance marker 53.17454°N 2.18660°W	—	c. 1830	The distance marker by the towpath of the Macclesfield Canal is constructed in sandstone and has a shaped top. It is marked on the south side with 1/2 and on the north side with 3/4.	II
Canal milestone 53.18355°N 2.15610°W		c. 1830	The milestone by the towpath of the Macclesfield Canal is constructed in sandstone and has a shaped top. The faces are inscribed with the distances in miles to Marple and to Hall Green.	II
Dane Aqueduct; 53.18446°N 2.14153°W		c. 1830	The aqueduct carries the Macclesfield Canal at a height of approximately 45 feet (13.7 m) over the River Dane, the engineer being William Crosley. It is built in sandstone and consists of a single semicircular arch with a span of approximately 35 feet (10.7 m). The aqueduct has a parapet and curved abutments with cast iron railings between balusters capped with urns.	II
Tunnel; 53.15662°N 2.20088°W	—	1830	The tunnel, now blocked, is under the Macclesfield Canal, and was designed by William Crosley. The north portal has not survived, but the south portal is in stone. It has a round-arched entrance with a keystone. The tunnel extends for about 50 feet (15 m).	II
Aqueduct; 53.15653°N 2.20133°W		1831	The aqueduct carries the Macclesfield Canal over Canal Road, and was designed by William Crosley. It consists of a cast iron trough carried on a cast iron arch, with a balustrade flanked by sandstone piers. The balustrade continues over curved wing walls.	II
Bridge no. 74; 53.15740°N 2.19095°W		1831	Originating as an accommodation bridge, it carries Morley Drive over the Macclesfield Canal. The bridge was designed by William Crosley, and is built in sandstone. Here the canal runs through a cutting, and the bridge is tall with a horseshoe arch. The parapets end in square piers and have slightly curved projecting copings.	II
Lambert's Lane Bridge; 53.15534°N 2.20382°W		1831	This is bridge no. 77 over the Macclesfield Canal; it is both an accommodation bridge and a roving bridge. The bridge was designed by William Crosley, it is built in sandstone, and has a horseshoe elliptical arch.	II
Morris Bridge; 53.15717°N 2.19574°W		1831	This is bridge no. 76 over the Macclesfield Canal; it is both an accommodation bridge and a roving bridge. The bridge was designed by William Crosley, it is built in sandstone, and has a horseshoe elliptical arch.	II
Bridge no. 58; 53.18330°N 2.14749°W		c. 1831	The bridge carries the A54 road over the Macclesfield Canal. It was designed by William Crosley, and is built in sandstone. The bridge has a horseshoe elliptical arch with voussoirs and a keystone. The walls end in square piers.	II
Bridge no. 61; 53.18302°N 2.16626°W		c. 1831	The bridge carries the A54 road over the Macclesfield Canal. It was designed by William Crosley, and is built in sandstone. The bridge has a horseshoe elliptical arch with voussoirs and a keystone. The walls end in square piers.	II
11 Bridge Street; 53.16342°N 2.21355°W		Early to mid-19th century	A brick house with a slate roof. It is in three storeys with one bay facing Bridge Street and three facing Victoria Street. The windows are sashes.	II
13 Bridge Street; 53.16347°N 2.21367°W		Early to mid-19th century	A brick house with a slate roof. It is in three storeys. The windows are sashes.	II
2 and 4 Chapel Street; 53.16234°N 2.21067°W		Early to mid-19th century	A pair of houses in rendered brick with slate roofs. They are in two storeys, and each house has a front of three bays. Above the doorways are fanlights.	II
The Cottage; 53.16527°N 2.21250°W		Early to mid-19th century	A brick house with a stone-slate roof. It is in a single storey with attics, and has a three-bay front. The windows are casements, those in the upper floor being in gables.	II
Canal fence posts 53.15898°N 2.18115°W	—	c. 1840	The fence posts are on the outside of the towpath of the Macclesfield Canal. There are 38 fence posts visible. They are in sandstone, and each has two railing slots.	II
St John's School; 53.16982°N 2.19547°W		1843	The former school is built in stone with slate roofs. There is a central projecting gabled bay forming a porch. On the sides of the school are two-light mullioned windows under semicircular heads. There are flat buttresses on all the corners.	II
St John's School House; 53.16980°N 2.19535°W		c. 1843	The house is attached to the school by an archway. It is built in stone with a slate roof, and is in two storeys. The windows are mullioned under semicircular heads. On the ends are coped gables.	II
7–11 Vale Walk; 53.16144°N 2.21441°W	—	1845	A range of brick houses with stone dressings in Tudor style. They are in two storeys with an attic and tiled roofs, and have a symmetrical front. The central bay projects forward, and has a gable with an arched niche containing a stone bust. There are three doorways with arched heads and stone gabled porches. The windows are casements.	II
Congleton Viaduct; 53.18875°N 2.15638°W		1849	The viaduct was designed by J. C. Forsyth for the North Staffordshire Railway to cross the River Dane. It is constructed in red and blue engineering brick and consists of 20 semicircular arches carried on rectangular piers.	II
Railway viaduct 53.16144°N 2.18596°W		c. 1849	The viaduct carries the railway over the valley of the Dane in Shaw Brook at a height of 130 feet (40 m). It is built in brick and consists of ten round-headed arches carried on rectangular piers.	II
1–5 Bridge Street; 53.16332°N 2.21326°W		Mid-19th century	A row of stuccoed shops in three storeys. At the top is a parapet that rises at the centre to form a pediment. In the ground floor are modern shop fronts. Above, the windows are casements in moulded architraves with pediments.	II
31–37 Chapel Street; 53.16170°N 2.21242°W		Mid-19th century	A row of brick houses and a public house with a slate roof. The buildings are in two storeys. No 31 is in three bays, and the others have two bays. The windows are sashes, and the doorways are round-headed with fanlights.	II
4 Duke Street; 53.16363°N 2.21431°W		Mid-19th century	A brick shop with a slate roof in three storeys with a three-bay front. In the ground floor is a modern shop front. The windows above are sashes, and below the windows are stone corbel tables.	II
Green Gables; 53.16440°N 2.24111°W	—	Mid-19th century	A brick house with a slate roof in two storeys. On each side of the doorway is a projecting gabled bay. The windows are mullioned and transomed with stone lintels and hood moulds, and contain casements. The doorway has an arched head, a fanlight, and a gabled porch. All the gables have decorative pierced bargeboards.	II
Heathfield; 53.16457°N 2.24201°W	—	Mid-19th century	A brick house with a slate roof in two storeys. The entrance front faces east, and has a central projecting gabled bay. This contains a two-light mullioned and transomed window, and a doorway with an arched head and a fanlight. There are two more gables on the south front facing the road. All the gables have ornamental pierced bargeboards.	II
Padgbury House; 53.16080°N 2.24228°W	—	Mid-19th century	A stone house in two storeys with an attic. It has a doorway with Tuscan pilasters, a semicircular head with a keystone and a radial fanlight. On the front is a gable with scalloped bargeboards. The windows are casements.	II
Coach house, Padgbury House; 53.16081°N 2.24241°W	—	Mid-19th century	The former coach house has an arched doorway and a circular opening in the gable.	II
Wharf Inn; 53.15694°N 2.20245°W		Mid-19th century	A brick public house with a slate roof, it is in two storeys and has a three-bay front. The windows are sashes. In the centre is a wooden doorcase with pilasters, an open pediment and a semicircular fanlight.	II
Obelisk, Danesford School; 53.16480°N 2.22435°W	—	Mid-19th century (probable)	The obelisk is in the grounds of the school, and is in the form of a Chinese pagoda. It stands on an octagonal pedestal and has panelled sides.	II
St Stephen's Vicarage; 53.16626°N 2.20439°W		1863	The vicarage was designed by Joseph Clarke in Elizabethan style. It is built in brick with stone and terracotta dressings, and has a tiled roof. It has a projecting gabled bay to the left and a porch on the right. The windows are mullioned and transomed.	II
Town Hall; 53.16290°N 2.21076°W		1864–66	The town hall was designed by E. W. Godwin in Gothic style. It is constructed in stone with a slate roof. The front is in two storeys with an attic containing six gabled dormers. The ground floor is in five bays, which was originally open and later contains shop fronts. The upper storey is in eight bays and with lancet windows. On the front of the town hall are three niches containing statues. From the centre rises a tower with a battlemented parapet, and on the top is a clock tower with a pyramidal roof.	II*
Former Albion Hotel; 53.16258°N 2.20626°W		Mid- to late 19th century	A range of offices in brick with stone dressings and a slate roof. Along Lawton Street they are in three storeys and extend for ten bays. Around the corner the building is in two storeys and extends for four bays. On the ground floor are shop fronts; the other windows are sashes.	II
Congregational Church; 53.16451°N 2.21707°W		1876–77	The church was designed by William Sugden in Gothic Revival style with unconventional features. It is constructed in stone with a slate roof. The west end has a double portal with a large window above. At the northeast corner is an octagonal turret.	II
The Counting House; 53.16378°N 2.21472°W		1879	Originally a bank, later a public house, it is in stone with a green slate roof, and is in Tudor style. There are two storeys and the windows are mullioned and transomed. The centre bay projects forward, with a window in the ground floor and above a gable with applied timber-framing. On the left is a two-storey canted bay window and a doorway. On the right is another bay with a doorway and a gateway and, on the corner, an oriel window that rises to an octagonal turret with a pinnacled roof and a finial.	II
Water tower 53.16600°N 2.22820°W		1881	The water tower was designed by William Blackshaw, and is built in red and yellow brick with bands of blue brick. It is in three stages, each of which contains openings with semicircular heads. At the top of the tower is a decorative brick frieze, a cornice, and iron railings.	II
Gates, gate piers and railings, St Peter's Churchyard; 53.16171°N 2.21209°W		Undated	The gate piers are in stone, and have panelled sides, and caps with ball finials. Between them are wrought iron gates, and an overthrow with a lantern. On the sides are low stone walls with wrought iron railings.	II
Paved area, Cockshuts; 53.16143°N 2.21143°W		Undated	Cockshuts is a lane leading from Chapel Street to Canal Street. It is paved with granite setts.	II
Pavement, walls, steps and railings, Rood Hill; 53.16768°N 2.21422°W		Undated	The pavement is raised above the level of the road, and has a stone wall incorporating a double flight of worn stone steps. It is paved mainly with concrete, but also has some large stone slabs and some blue brick. On the wall are 19th-century wrought iron railings.	II

== See also ==
- Listed buildings in Cheshire
  - Listed buildings in Bosley
  - Listed buildings in North Rode
  - Listed buildings in Eaton
  - Listed buildings in Hulme Walfield
  - Listed buildings in Somerford
  - Listed buildings in Newbold Astbury
  - Listed buildings in Rushton, Staffordshire
  - Listed buildings in Biddulph, Staffordshire
- List of textile mills in Cheshire
- Silk industry of Cheshire
