= George Robinson (cricketer, born 1861) =

Welsh cricketer

George Edward Robinson (13 March 1861 – 30 November 1944) was a Welsh cricketer who played first-class cricket for Oxford University Cricket Club.

== Life ==
Robinson was born on 13 March 1861 in Deytheur (a corruption of Deuddwr) in Montgomeryshire (near Llansantffraid-ym-Mechain), the son of Edward Robinson.

He was educated at Burton Grammar School in Staffordshire and Jesus College, Oxford, where he was listed as an armiger. He won his first "Blue" in 1881, when he played in the university match against Cambridge. He won his Blue in the following two seasons as well. In his three Blues matches, he took six wickets and scored 15 runs.

In all, he played 17 first-class matches for Oxford University, scoring 168 runs in 30 innings, at an average of 8.84 with a highest score of 28; he was primarily a left-arm fast bowler, and took 80 wickets at an average of 17.16, with best bowling figures of seven wickets for 47 runs. James Lillywhite's Cricketers' Annual described him as "an apathetic bat and field".

He also played, outside first-class, at county level for Montgomeryshire and, between 1880 and 1903, for Shropshire while playing at club level for Oswestry. For Shropshire he played 38 matches, totalled 785 runs with a best match score of 54, and took 194 wickets.

He died on 30 November 1944 aged 83 in Acton, Staffordshire.
