= A536 road =

Road in England

A536

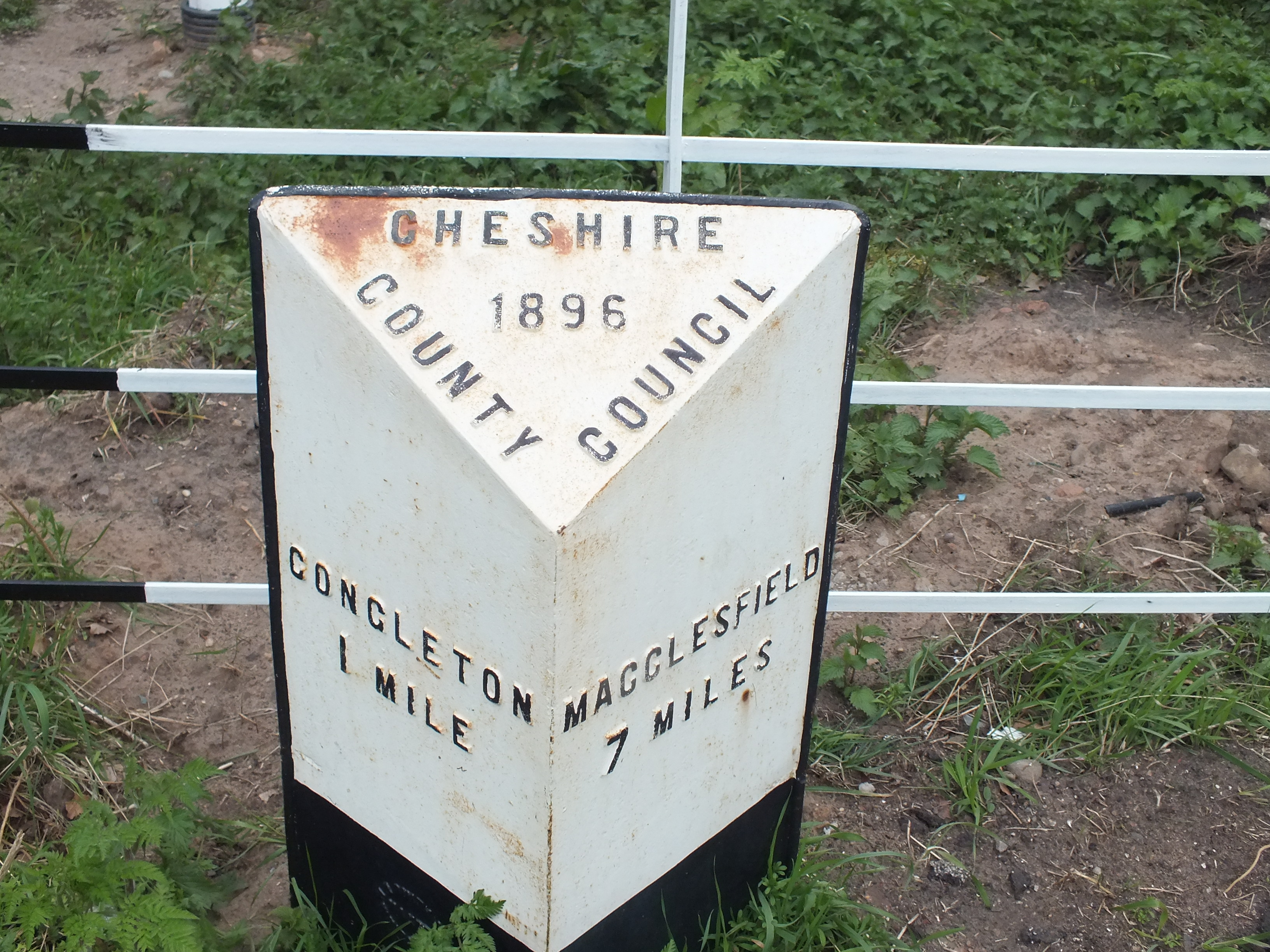
- Milestone on the junction of the A537 and Havannah Lane

Route information
- Length: 7.4 mi (11.9 km)

Major junctions
- North end: Macclesfield
- A523 A538; A34
- South end: Congleton

Location
- Country: United Kingdom

Road network
- Roads in the United Kingdom; Motorways; A and B road zones

The A536 road links the Cheshire towns of Congleton and Macclesfield.

== Route ==
Starting at the junction with the A34 in Lower Heath, Congleton, the road travels through the villages of Eaton and Gawsworth before entering Macclesfield. Once into Macclesfield, it take a right turn at the traffic lights by the Flower Pot public house, becoming Park Lane.

Passing the Learning Zone (Macclesfield College and The Macclesfield Academy) it travels to the end of Park Lane, veering right at a roundabout to become Park Street. After a short distance, the road turns right at the Park Green traffic lights and runs a short distance to join the A523 Mill Lane / The Silk Road at a T junction controlled by traffic lights.

The Congleton Link Road, which was completed in 2021, continues the A536 from just south of Eaton to join the A534 Sandbach Road, bypassing Congleton to the north.

== History ==
Between Eaton and Gawsworth, there are three places in the space of 4 miles now signposted as lay-bys which used to be the original course of the A536 but which have been left in place as stopping areas following straightening of the road.

Closer to Gawsworth, the road used to pass immediately in front of the Harrington Arms public house and then take a right angle turn around the pub. This original route can be seen when examining Cheshire Tithe Maps.
