= St Peter's Church, Congleton =

Coordinates: 53.1618°N 2.2116°W

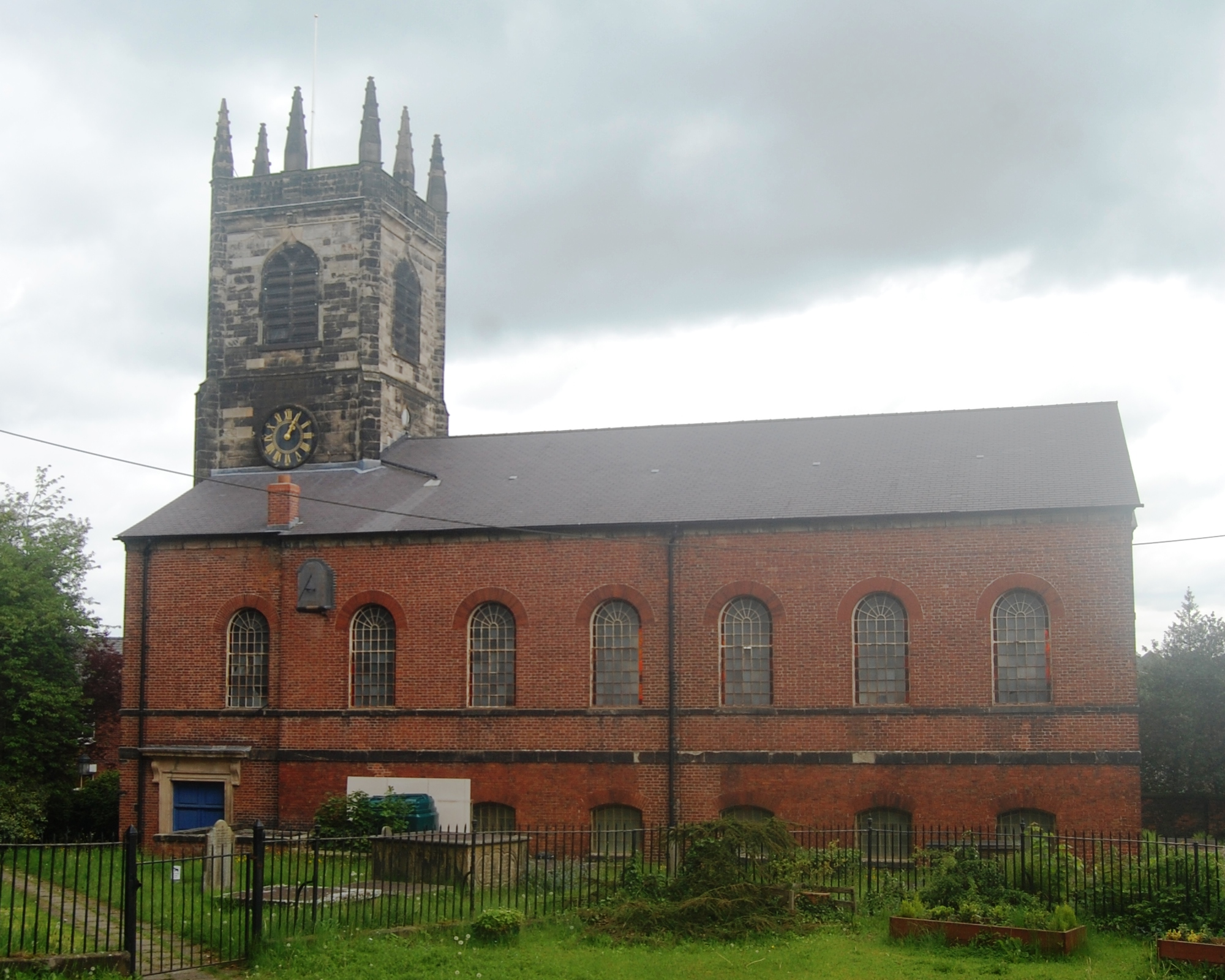
- St Peter's Church, Congleton, from the south

- Location in Cheshire
- OS grid reference: SJ 859 628
- Location: Congleton, Cheshire
- Country: England
- Denomination: Anglican
- Website: All Saints Congleton

History
- Former name: Congleton Team Parish
- Status: Parish church
- Dedication: Saint Peter

Architecture
- Functional status: Active
- Heritage designation: Grade I
- Designated: 28 July 1950
- Architect: William Baker
- Architectural type: Church
- Style: Tower Gothic; Body of church Neoclassical
- Completed: 1840

Specifications
- Materials: Red brick with stone dressings Stone slate roof Stone tower

Administration
- Province: York
- Diocese: Chester
- Archdeaconry: Macclesfield
- Deanery: Congleton
- Parish: Congleton

Clergy
- Vicar: Rev Ian Enticott

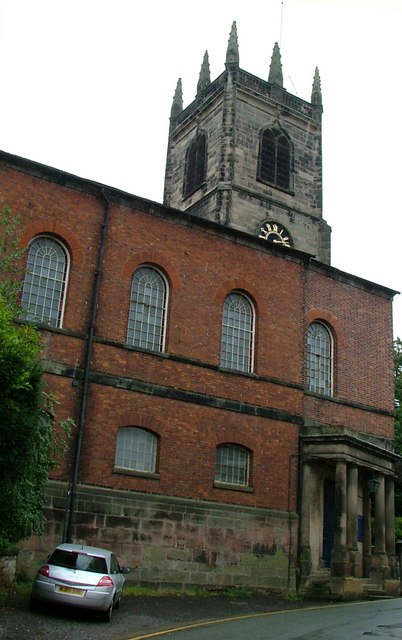
The church from the northwest

St Peter's Church is in Chapel Street, Congleton, Cheshire, England. It is recorded in the National Heritage List for England as a designated Grade I listed building. It is an active Anglican parish church in the Diocese of Chester, the archdeaconry of Macclesfield and the deanery of Congleton. Its benefice is combined with those of St Stephen, Congleton, St John the Evangelist, Buglawton, and Holy Trinity, Mossley. Alec Clifton-Taylor includes it in his list of 'best' English parish churches. The Church Buildings Council included St Peter's in its group of 300 Major Parish Churches following research produced in 2016. [Pursell 2016]

== History ==
The original church was built on the site in the early 15th century as a chapel of ease to St Mary, Astbury. It was timber framed and by 1740 its structure had become decayed. A new church was built in the Neoclassical style and completed by 1742. The tower was raised in 1786. The lower part of the 14th century tower was retained. The architect was William Baker of Audlem. In 1839–40 the church was extended at the west end by one bay on each side of the tower, and a porch was added, also at the west end, by Joshua Radford.

== Architecture ==
=== Exterior ===
The church is built in red brick with stone dressings, the roof is of stone slate and the west tower is of stone. Its plan consists of a five-bay nave continuous with a single-bay chancel, and north and south aisles. The tower is at the west end. The tower has a clock and on its summit is a parapet and pinnacles. Two coats of arms are carved on the western wall. The door is at the west end and is surrounded by a porch with Doric columns.

=== Interior ===
Internally there are galleries on the north, south and west sides, and Georgian box pews. The pulpit dates from the 17th century and, at the time Richards was writing, it was the only pulpit in Cheshire to be placed in front of the sanctuary in the middle of the nave. Between the nave and the aisles are square piers supporting Tuscan columns. The marble font dates from 1742 and a brass candelabrum from 1748. The reredos is dated 1743 and its panels contain the Lord's Prayer, the Ten Commandments and the Apostles' Creed. The east window is Palladian in style and is flanked by mural paintings of Saint Peter and Saint Paul by Edward Penny of Knutsford. The royal coat of arms of William III dated 1702 are at the east end of the north gallery.

The only stained glass is in the east window. Part of this dates from about 1740, and depicts the Holy Spirit as a dove. Below this is glass dating from about 1922. The finest memorial is a wall tablet in memory of Sir Thomas Reade who died in 1849. This is by Thomas and Edward Gaffin and shows a native kneeling by a palm tree. There are more wall tablets dating from the 19th century, and monuments from the 18th and 19th centuries. The organ was built in 1824 by Renn and Boston and was rebuilt in 1911 by Steele and Keay. There is a ring of eight bells. The oldest four were made by Rudhall of Gloucester, three in 1720 and one in 1757. The other four were cast at the Whitechapel Bell Foundry, one by Thomas Mears and Son in 1806, and the others by Mears and Stainbank in 1867.

== External features ==
The gates, gate piers and railings of the churchyard are listed at Grade II. The gate piers are of stone with panelled sides and cornice caps. The gates and railings are in wrought iron. Over the gate is a wrought iron overthrow and a lantern. The churchyard contains the war graves of eleven British service personnel, seven of World War I, and four of World War II.

== See also ==
- Grade I listed buildings in Cheshire East
- Grade I listed churches in Cheshire
- Listed buildings in Congleton
