= Moss Rose =

Football stadium in England

Coordinates: 53°14′34″N 02°07′38″W

Leasing.com Stadium
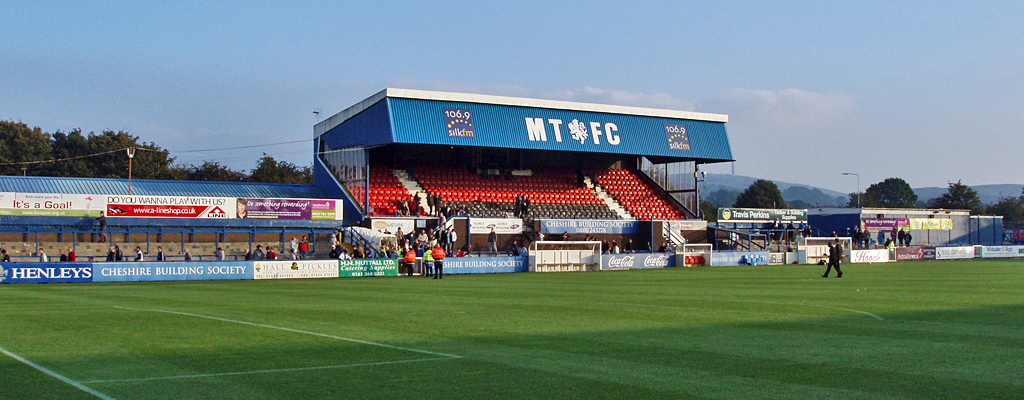
- Silk FM Main Stand in 2007
- Interactive map of Leasing.com Stadium
- Full name: Leasing.com Stadium
- Location: London Road; Macclesfield; Cheshire; England; SK11 7SP
- Elevation: 513 feet (156 m)
- Owner: Macc Football Club Limited
- Operator: Macclesfield F.C.
- Capacity: 5,350 (2,095 seated)
- Surface: 4G Artificial turf
- Record attendance: 10,041 (Witton Albion vs Northwich Victoria, Cheshire Senior Cup Semi-Final, 19 March 1948)
- Field size: 100m x 60m
- Public transit: High Peak Buses route 14

Construction
- Built: 1891
- Opened: 12 September 1891; 135 years ago

Tenants
- Macclesfield Town (1891–2020; as Macclesfield F.C. 1891–1897 & 1900–1940); Hallefield F.C. (1897–1900); Chester City (1990–1992); Macclesfield F.C. (2020–Present)

Moss Rose, known as the Leasing.com Stadium for sponsorship reasons, is a football stadium in Macclesfield, Cheshire, England, which is the home ground of Macclesfield F.C., and the former home of Macclesfield Town F.C., a club wound up in September 2020. The stadium, 1 mile (1.6 km) south of the town centre, is on the west side of the A523 London Road. The capacity is currently 5,350. It was built in 1891, making it one of the oldest grounds in England.

== History ==
Moss Rose first hosted Football League matches when Chester City played home games at the stadium, between moving from Sealand Road to the Deva Stadium, from 1990 to 1992. The first such match was a 2–1 win for Exeter City on 1 September 1990. Later in the month, Arsenal played at Moss Rose in a Football League Cup tie, winning 1–0. Macclesfield Town was a non-league side at the time and fixtures were arranged so Chester were at home when Macclesfield Town were away and vice versa. The Moss Rose pitch was having to contend with more than 50 first team matches a season from the two sides.

Despite hosting Football League matches in this period, Macclesfield Town were denied entry to the Football League in 1995 after winning the Football Conference after the stadium requirements were tightened. A reciprocal offer by Chester to allow Macclesfield Town to play at the Deva Stadium while the necessary improvements were made was also rejected by the Football League. Macclesfield Town were champions again two years later, and the ground was now up to the required standards. Macclesfield Town beat Torquay United in their first home league match on 9 August 1997.

In March 2026, part of the stadium was set alight in a suspected arson attack; nobody was injured in the blaze.

== Structure and facilities ==
The ground consists of four stands. The Main stand is on the east side of the pitch and houses only home supporters, unless the travelling support is particularly large. In which case the northern end, which is terraced, accommodates some away fans. The Star Lane End is to the left (south) of the Main Stand, and is used by the home support. On the west side is the Moss Lane Stand (originally known as the McAlpine stand, named after the contractor that built Huddersfield Town's Kirklees Stadium). This is all-seated and covered, and houses home supporters, and a small number of travelling fans. At the north end is the Silkmen Terrace, an open terrace for away fans. Unfortunately, as Macclesfield is often struck by wet weather, this can make for an uncomfortable spectating experience for visiting fans.

== Sale ==
After Macclesfield Town F.C. was wound up in September 2020, the stadium was listed for sale with offers invited in excess of £500,000, roughly equivalent to the amount owed to the club's creditors.

On 13 October 2020, the Official Receiver confirmed that the assets of Macclesfield Town had been sold to Macc Football Club Limited. Local businessman (and owner of 10th tier Stockport Town) Robert Smethurst had purchased the assets, intending to rebrand the club as Macclesfield Football Club and enter the North West Counties Football League in the 2021–22 campaign. These plans went ahead as scheduled and in their first season Macclesfield secured the North West Counties Premier Division title and promotion to the NPL Division One West.
