= Buglawton Hall =

Coordinates: 53.17709°N 2.17308°W

Buglawton Hall School

Location
- Buxton Road; Congleton, Cheshire, CW12 3PQ; England

Information
- Type: Community special school
- Closed: March 2018
- Local authority: Manchester City Council
- Executive Principal: Jonathan Gillie
- Gender: Boys
- Age range: 7–16

Buglawton Hall is a former country house, later a school, to the northeast of Buglawton, a suburb of Congleton, Cheshire, England.

== Architecture ==
The building dates from the 16th century, with later additions and alterations. In the 19th century its exterior was stuccoed and castellated. Later in the century a billiard room and a service wing were added. The house is constructed in brick on a stone plinth, with a half-timbered core. Pevsner describes it as a "modest C16 house [which] was absorbed into an early C18 one, which was brought up to date in the late C18 with castellations, a fine fanlight, and fashionable Roman cement".

Manchester Corporation replaced a "good medieval timber roof" in the stable block with a steel roof.

The hall, together with outbuildings to the east, is recorded in the National Heritage List for England as a designated Grade II listed building.

== History of the house ==
In 1811 Mr Pearson, a silk manufacturer, was living at Buglawton Hall. In 1883 the owner of the house was Fanny Pearson, a widow, who died that year. One of Fanny Pearson's daughters, Julia Pearson, married Charles William Doherty, who was the son of the Chief League of Justice of Ireland, John Doherty, who was a relation to the UK's shortest second serving prime minister, George Canning. Together they had children, including their daughter Madelaine Doherty, who was believed to be the last owner of Buglawton Hall.

== School ==
In 1947 there was discussion about the local authority buying the building for use as a grammar school. In 1950 it was purchased by Manchester City Council. The school was opened in 1954 as a school for maladjusted children. The school was residential and had the capacity to take 41 children.

In 2000 Ofsted found the school, which was by then termed a Special school for children with Emotional and behaviour disorder, to be Effective.

In 2006 Ofsted found the school to be Good, though noted that the boarding accommodation was in a poor condition.

In 2008 Ofsted judged the school to be Inadequate and requiring Special Measures. They listed, amongst other issues, that there was no headteacher in post and therefore management and oversight were poor; behaviour management was inconsistent; children did not make enough progress to make up for previous poor attainment; there were safety issues; and there was no recording of disciplinary sanctions taken against children or of occasions when children were restrained. As a result of this, in 2009 the executive principal was sacked.

In 2011 Ofsted judged the school to be Satisfactory and it came out of Special Measures.

In 2013 Ofsted again judged the school as Inadequate and requiring Special Measures. There were serious concerns about leadership, governance, behaviour management and children's safety, and teaching required improvement. In addition, "serious allegations of a child protection nature were being investigated by the appropriate authorities".

In 2014 Ofsted judged the school as Good and no longer requiring Special Measures.

In 2017 the local authority decided to close the school; it had 14 pupils at this point and some of the buildings were disused or not fit for purpose. In 2018 the school was closed.

== Current use ==
In September 2023 it was reported that the residential block of Buglawton Hall School has been leased to Nestlings Care.

== See also ==
- Listed buildings in Congleton
