= Marsh Lane, Bootle =

Street in Bootle, England

Marsh Lane
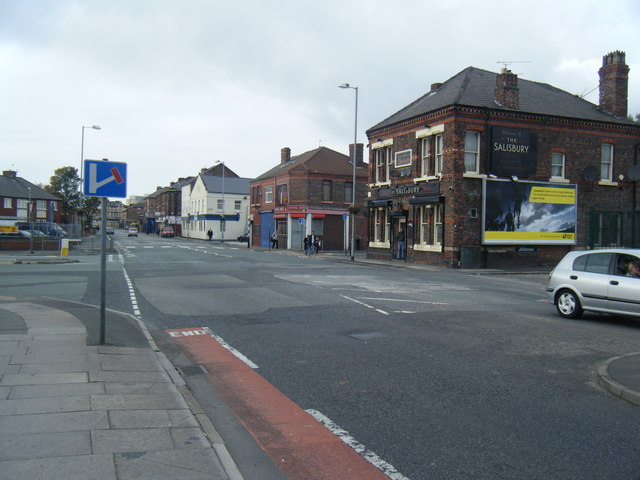
- Marsh Lane, looking west from Irlam Road. The Salisbury public house is on the right
- Interactive map of Marsh Lane
- Part of: A5098
- Length: 1 mi (1.6 km)
- Location: Bootle, Merseyside, England
- West end: Rimrose Road (A565)
- East end: Aintree Road (A5098); Hawthorne Road (A5090)

Marsh Lane is a major street in Bootle, Merseyside, England. Part of the A5098, it runs for around 1 mile (1.6 km) from Rimrose Road (the A565) in the west to a junction with Aintree Road (which continues east as the A5098) and Hawthorne Road (formerly Bootle Road; the A5090). It was once the main street which led to and from Bootle's docklands.

The street was named for Bootle Marsh, which overlooked Bootle Bay.

The original Bootle village was located at the junction of Merton and Litherland Roads, just short of a mile from the banks of the River Mersey.

== History ==
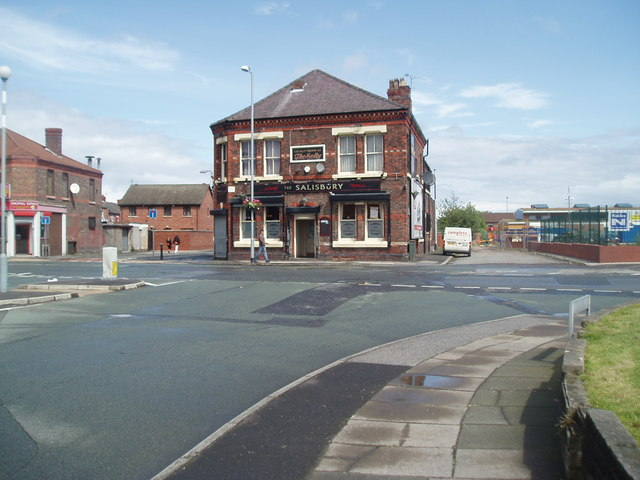
The Salisbury public house

Two obelisks formerly stood on Bootle's waterfront in the second half of the 19th century to assist with maritime navigation. They were the subject of a watercolour painting, titled Bootle Landmarks, by Samuel Austin. They were removed in 1874, when work on today's Alexandra Dock began.

The Gladstone Dock open-air swimming baths and the Slipper baths formerly stood on Marsh Lane opposite its junction with Irlam Road.

Marsh Lane used to lead down to Linacre Marsh. The northern edge of what was then Linacre village was Rimrose Brook, with the southern boundary being marked by a second brook, which rose in Bootle and flowed to the Mersey alongside the mill stream.

St James Church was built in the Gothic Revival style in 1845. A school was built three years later. Marsh Lane Wesleyan Methodist Church followed in 1903.

The Salisbury public house (nicknamed The Solly) stands on Marsh Lane, across from Irlam Road.

== Transportation ==
=== Road ===
Marsh Lane's major junctions are (from west to east):

- Bibby's Lane
- Chaucer Street
- Irlam Road
- Washington Parade
- Delaware Road
- Stanley Road
- Litherland Road

=== Public transport ===
Bootle New Strand railway station stands on the southern side Marsh Lane at its junction with Washington Parade. It opened in 1850, when it was named Marsh Lane & Strand Road. It was given its current name when the nearby New Strand Shopping Centre was built. Bootle Balliol Road railway station existed between 1881 and 1948.

Five bus routes serve Marsh Lane: the Arriva North West numbers 61 and 144, and Stagecoach Merseyside's numbers 136, 235 and 693.

== References in popular culture ==
In 2022, The Overlap visited Bootle, with Jamie Carragher showing Gary Neville around the area. They began on Marsh Lane, where Carragher grew up during the 1980s. His father once ran The Salisbury.

== Bibliography ==
- Butt, R. V. J. (October 1995). The Directory of Railway Stations: details every public and private passenger station, halt, platform and stopping place, past and present (1st ed.). Sparkford: Patrick Stephens Ltd. ISBN 978-1-85260-508-7. OCLC 60251199. OL 11956311M.
- Pollard, Richard; Pevsner, Nikolaus (2006). Lancashire: Liverpool and the South West. Yale University Press. ISBN 9780300109108. OCLC 63396571.
