= Congleton United Reformed Church =

Coordinates: 53.1645°N 2.2171°W

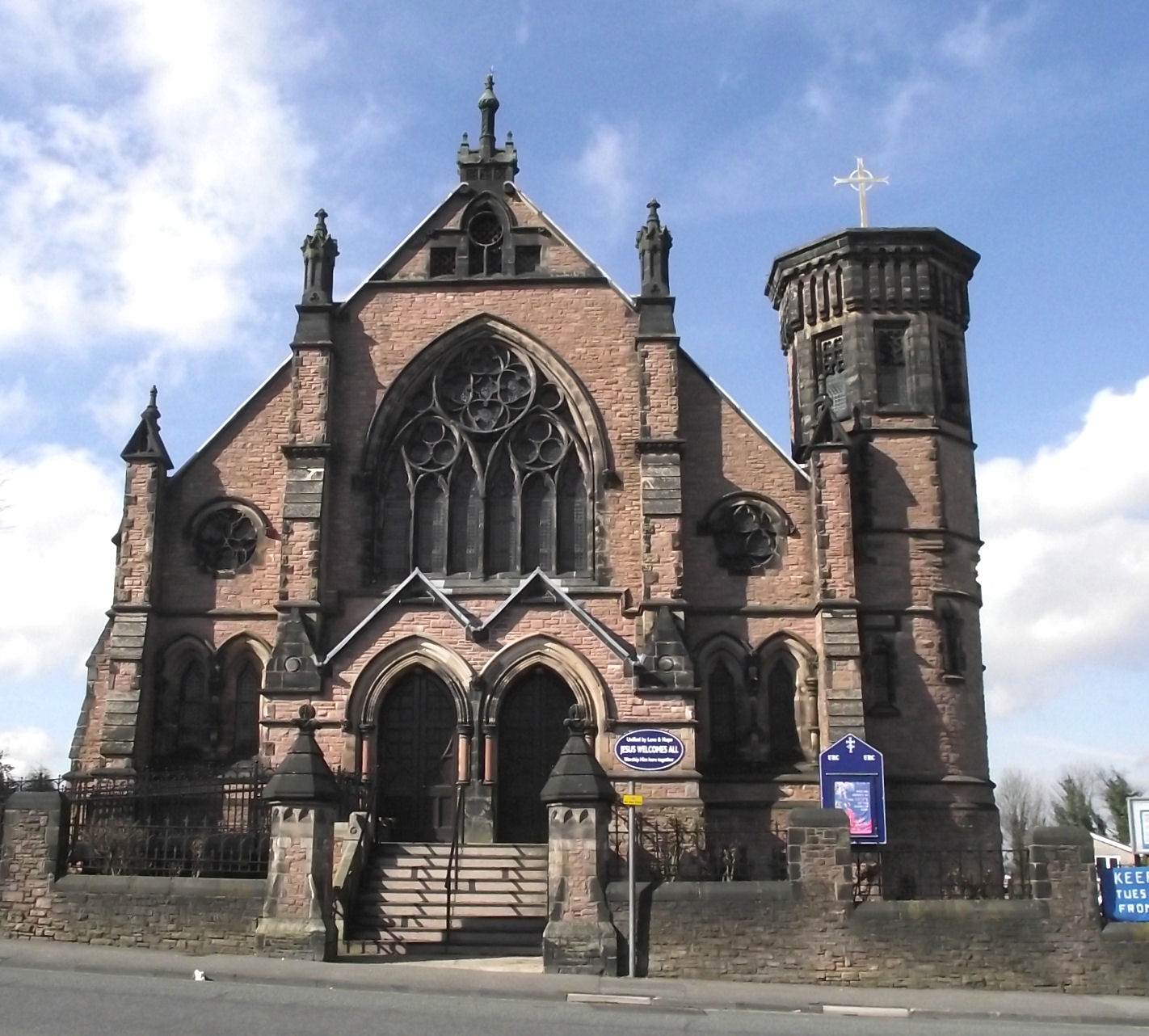
- United Reformed Church, Antrobus Street, Congleton

- Location in Cheshire
- OS grid reference: SJ 856 631
- Location: Antrobus Street, Congleton, Cheshire
- Country: England
- Denomination: United Reformed Church

Architecture
- Functional status: Closed
- Heritage designation: Grade II
- Designated: 4 April 1975
- Architect: William Sugden
- Architectural type: Church
- Style: Gothic Revival
- Groundbreaking: 1876
- Completed: 1877

Specifications
- Materials: Stone, slate roof

Congleton United Reformed Church was a church in Antrobus Street, Congleton, Cheshire, England. It is recorded in the National Heritage List for England as a designated Grade II listed building.

== History ==
The building originated as a Congregational church. It was designed by William Sugden, an architect from Leek, and built in 1876–77.

== Architecture ==
Constructed in stone, the church has a slate roof. Its architectural style is Gothic Revival. The entrance front has a double portal, each doorway having a pointed arch. At the northeast is a squat octagonal turret. There is a large west window. On the gable above it is a large tabernacle surmounted by a ball finial with a long stalk. The authors of the Buildings of England series state that the church exhibits "astonishingly free handling of the Gothic precedents", and that "everything is richly and individually treated". Inside the church is a gallery at the east end. The three-manual organ was made by J. J. Binns for Claremont Baptist Church, Bolton. It was moved here and rebuilt in 1984 by Leonard Reeves.

== Closure ==
It was announced in April 2025 that the church would close, being too large for the congregation to maintain. The Rev. Murray George said that the decision had been made very reluctantly at the end of March, following a long period of deliberation.

In July 2025 it was announced that the church would close in September, with the building being sold at auction on 27 August. The auction date was later delayed, with a new planned auction date of 24 September.

The church closed in September 2025.

The Church was sold at auction for £200,000 in September 2025.

The Church was sold at auction for a second time in on 28 April 2026.

== Future ==
In May 2026 FST Property announced plans to convert the former church into a wedding and events venue, the planned new venue is planned to be called "Wolstenholme Hall".

== See also ==
- Listed buildings in Congleton
