= Listed buildings in Blore with Swinscoe =

Blore with Swinscoe is a civil parish in the district of Staffordshire Moorlands, Staffordshire, England. It contains ten listed buildings that are recorded in the National Heritage List for England. Of these, one is listed at Grade I, the highest of the three grades, and the others are at Grade II, the lowest grade. The parish contains the villages of Blore and Swinscoe and the surrounding countryside. The listed buildings consist of a church and a cross in the churchyard, a house, a bridge, a cowhouse, structures at an entrance to Ilam Park, and two mileposts.

== Key ==
Grade	Criteria
I	Buildings of exceptional interest, sometimes considered to be internationally important
II	Buildings of national importance and special interest

== Buildings ==
Name and location	Photograph	Date	Notes	Grade
St Bartholomew's Church; 53.04101°N 1.79661°W		13th century (probable)	The church was remodelled in the early 16th century. It is built in limestone and sandstone and has lead roofs. The church consists of a nave, a south porch, a north aisle, a chancel with a north chapel, and a west tower. The tower has three stages, a west window with a pointed head, gargoyles, a moulded parapet string course, and an embattled parapet with corner pinnacles.	I
Churchyard cross 53.04093°N 1.79645°W	—	Medieval	The older part of the cross is the square stepped base. The rest of it dates from the late 19th century, and consists of a square shaft with chamfered edges, tapering towards the top, and a cross with lobed arms.	II
Blore Hall; 53.04171°N 1.79554°W		Early 16th century	The house was later altered and extended. The early part is in red brick with stone dressings, the later part is in limestone, and the roofs are tiled. The house is in two and three storeys, and has two parallel ranges. The doorway has a rectangular fanlight, and the windows vary, some with mullions, and some with four-centred arched heads.	II
Coldwall Bridge; 53.04484°N 1.77907°W		Mid 18th century	The bridge, which carries a track over the River Dove, was widened and heightened in the 19th century. It is in limestone, and consists of one broad segmental arch, and two small semicircular arches, with a flight of steps. The parapet walls are coped, and the bridge is heavily buttressed.	II
Cowhouse; 53.02539°N 1.78890°W	—	18th century	The cowhouse is in limestone and has a tile roof with coped verges. There is one storey and three bays, three doors, and a central through-passage.	II
Wood Lodge, steps, walls and piers 53.05248°N 1.80159°W		Early 19th century	Originally a lodge to Ilam Hall, it is in limestone with quoins, and has a tile roof with coped verges and ball finials. It is in Gothic style, and has one storey and an attic, and three bays. There is a central gabled porch approached by a balustraded staircase with two piers that have moulded caps. The porch and doorway have Tudor arched openings, and the windows have moulded mullions.	II
Gate pier and wall northeast of Wood Lodge; 53.05253°N 1.80152°W	—	Early 19th century	The gate pier and wall are in stone. The pier has a square section, a moulded base, chamfered edges, and a shaped cap. The wall to the north is coped.	II
Gate piers and gates east of Wood Lodge; 53.05254°N 1.80101°W	—	Early 19th century	The gateway is at an entrance to Ilam Hall. There are four square stone gate piers, the outer ones with pyramidal caps, and the inner ones with chamfered edges, gabled caps, and roll-moulded ridges. The gates are in wrought iron.	II
Milepost at NGR SK 13014846; 53.03325°N 1.80741°W		1834	The milepost is on the southwest side of the A52 road. It is in cast iron, and has a cylindrical post and a larger cylindrical head with panels. At the top is the name of the maker and the date, on the panels are the distances to Leek and to Ashbourne, and on the post is the distance to London.	II
Milepost at NGR SK 14244746; 53.02435°N 1.78896°W		1834	The milepost is on the southwest side of the A52 road. It is in cast iron, and has a cylindrical post and a larger cylindrical head with panels. At the top is the name of the maker and the date, on the panels are the distances to Leek and to Ashbourne, and on the post is the distance to London.	II
