= St Mary's Church, Congleton =

Church in Congleton, Cheshire, England

Coordinates: 53.1644°N 2.2226°W

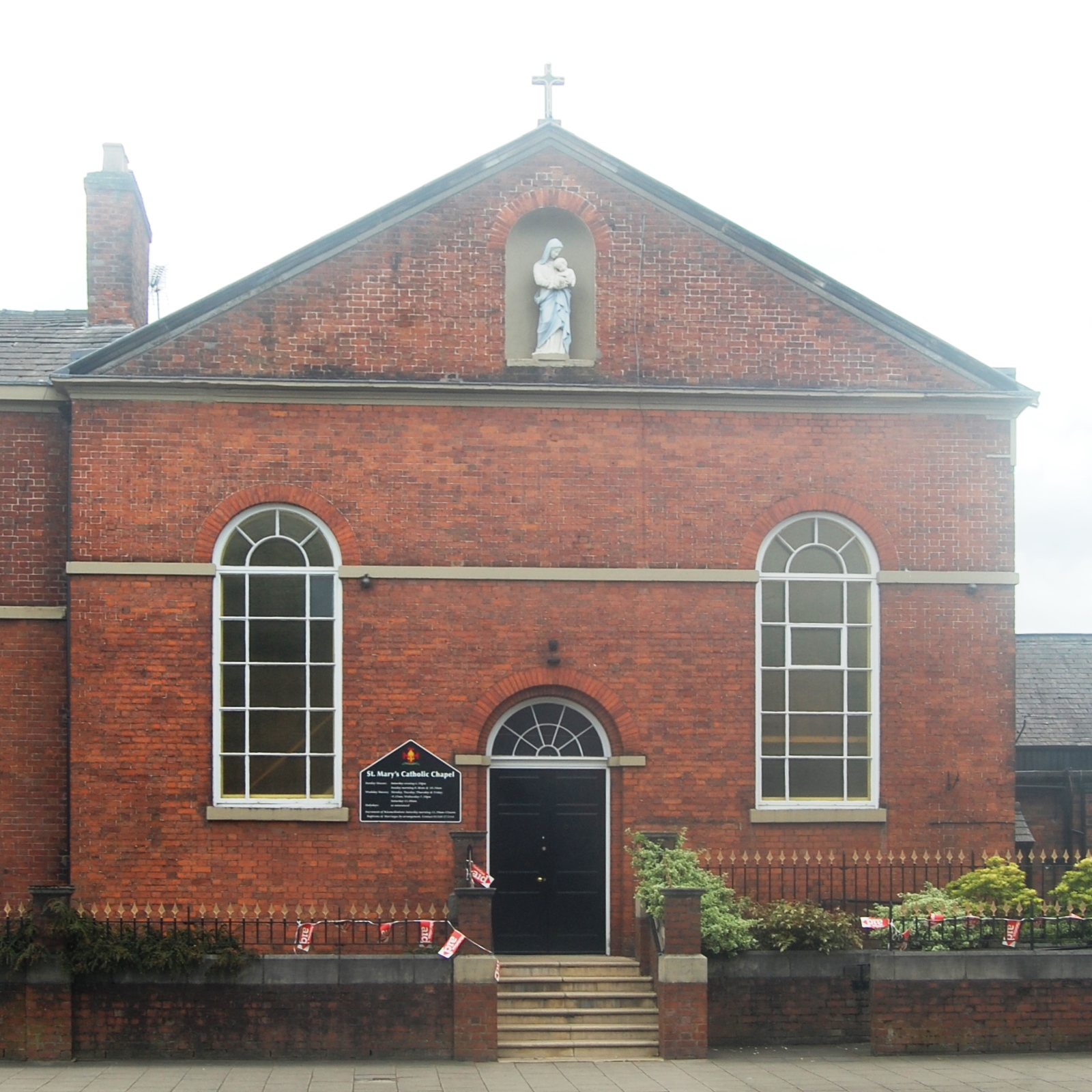
- St Mary's Church, Congleton

- Location in Cheshire
- OS grid reference: SJ 852 631
- Location: West Road, Congleton, Cheshire
- Country: England
- Denomination: Roman Catholic
- Website: St Mary's Catholic Chapel, Congleton

History
- Status: Parish church
- Dedication: Virgin Mary

Architecture
- Functional status: Active
- Heritage designation: Grade II
- Designated: 4 April 1975
- Architect: Father John Hall
- Architectural type: Church
- Completed: 1826

Specifications
- Materials: Brick, slate roof

St Mary's Church is in West Road, Congleton, Cheshire, England. It is a Roman Catholic church recorded in the National Heritage List for England as a designated Grade II listed building. The listing includes the adjoining presbytery.

== History ==
St Mary's Church was built in 1826, and designed by Father John Hall, a priest from Macclesfield. The presbytery dates from 1830.

== Architecture ==
The church is constructed in red brick, stands on a stone plinth, and has a slate roof. The façade facing the road is in two storeys. It has a central doorway with a semicircular head and a radial fanlight, and two windows also with semicircular heads. At the top is a pediment containing a niche with a statue of the Virgin Mary. The east end is slightly polygonal. Inside the church is a tripartite screen carried on Ionic columns. The authors of the Buildings of England series comment that, apart from the niche containing the statue, it is similar to a Methodist church of the time. The presbytery also has a doorway with a semicircular head and a radial fanlight. Its windows are sashes.

== See also ==
- Listed buildings in Congleton
