= Holy Trinity Church, Congleton =

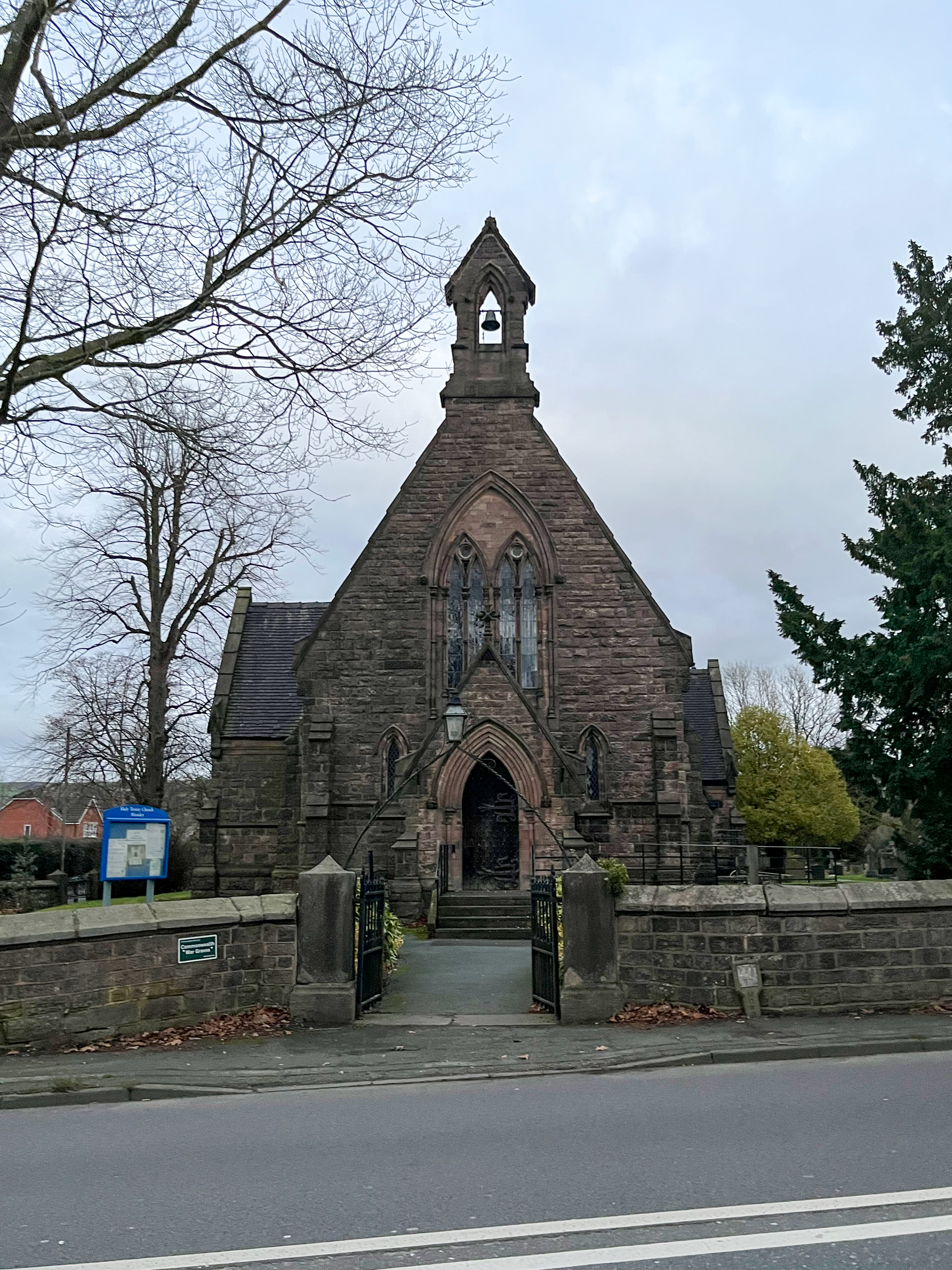
- Holy Trinity Church, Mossley, Congleton
- Holy Trinity Church, Congleton
- 53°09′12″N 2°11′01″W
- OS grid reference: SJ 87809 61817
- Country: England
- Denomination: Anglican

History
- Status: Active
- Consecrated: 23 October 1845

Architecture
- Architect: James Trubshaw
- Style: Victorian-Gothic
- Years built: 1844-1845
- Groundbreaking: 1844
- Completed: 1845

Administration
- Archdiocese: Macclesfield
- Diocese: Chester
- Parish: Congleton

Clergy
- Vicar: Rev Ian Enticott

Holy Trinity Church is a Anglican church in Mossley, Congleton, Cheshire, England.

== History ==
Construction of Holy Trinity Church began in 1844 and was finished in 1845, the church was built as part of an effect to combat the rise of the non-conformist movement in Congleton.

The church was designed by Architect James Trubshaw, Trubshaw was known at the time for having designed many of the Churches in Potteries area of Staffordshire.

The land for Holy Trinity Church was donated by James Brierley who owned Mossley Hall, Brierley would become the first vicar of Holy Trinity Church.

Holy Trinity Church was expanded in 1849, the expansion included the addition of a porch on the west side of the church.

Holy Trinity Church was built in Victorian-Gothic architectural design.

When Holy Trinity Church opened it was part of the parish of Astbury ST Mary.

In the past Holy Trinty Church held a Church fair, a notable one of these was the 1959 Church fair which was opened by Freddie Grisewood.

In 2000 Holy Trinity Church was part of the Congleton Team Parish.

Holy Trinity Church is one of four churches in the All Saints Congleton parish, the other three churches being St John's, St Stephen's and St Peter's.

On 30 April 2026 All Saints Congleton published proposals regarding a planned closure Holy Trinity Church.

Holy Trinity Church is currently used as a Chapel of Ease.

A public meeting was held on 1 October 2026 regarding the future of Holy Trinity Church.

== Vicars ==
- James Brierley 1845-1871
- David Hyndman 2000
- Ian Enticott 2026
