= Buglawton =

Suburb of Congleton, Cheshire, England

Coordinates: 53°10′14″N 2°11′44″W

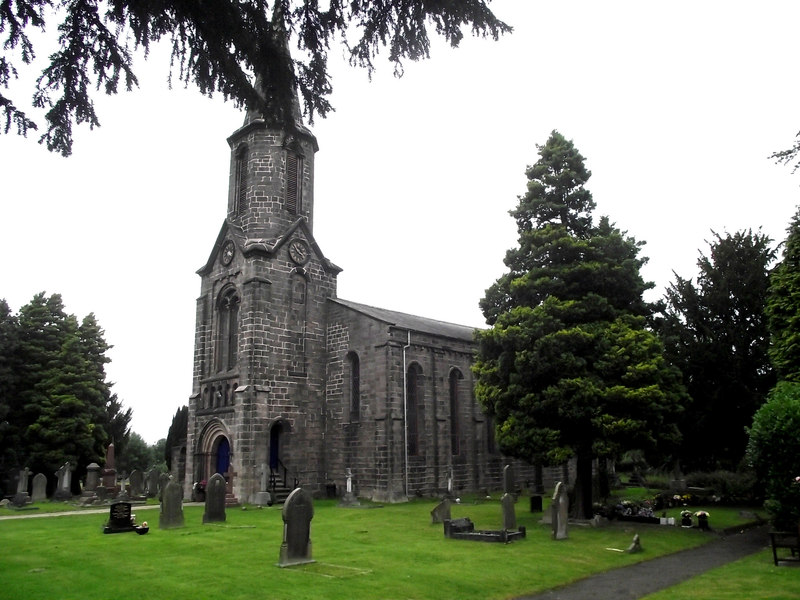
- St John's Church

- Location within Cheshire
- Civil parish: Congleton
- Unitary authority: Cheshire East
- Ceremonial county: Cheshire
- Region: North West
- Country: England
- Sovereign state: United Kingdom
- Police: Cheshire
- Fire: Cheshire
- Ambulance: North West

Buglawton is a suburb of Congleton, in the Cheshire East borough of Cheshire, lying to the north-east of the town centre. It was formerly a separate parish, but was absorbed into the borough of Congleton in 1936 and has been administered as part of the town since then.

== Toponymy ==
The name "Buglawton" means 'boggart's hill farm'. The prefix 'bug' (boggart) is to distinguish it from nearby Church Lawton.

== Governance ==
There are two tiers of local government covering Buglawton, at civil parish (town) and unitary authority level: Congleton Town Council and Cheshire East Council.

=== Administrative history ===
Buglawton was historically one of twelve townships within the ancient parish of Astbury, and formed part of the Northwich hundred of Cheshire. From the 17th century onwards, parishes were gradually given various civil functions under the poor laws, in addition to their original ecclesiastical functions. In some cases, including Astbury, the civil functions were exercised by each township separately rather than the parish as a whole. In 1866, the legal definition of 'parish' was changed to be the areas used for administering the poor laws, and so Buglawton became a civil parish. The parish church of St John was built in 1841, in which year Buglawton became a separate ecclesiastical parish from Astbury.

The township included the hamlets of Timbersbrook, Key Green, Crossley and Havannah, plus the Cheshire side of the hill called the Cloud.

The Buglawton township was made a local government district in 1863, following a vote by the ratepayers. It was then administered by an elected local board. Although most local government districts covered towns, a large number of such districts were created in 1862 and 1863 covering less populous places. Being made a local government district allowed such places to avoid being grouped into a highway district under the Highways Act 1862. The government passed legislation in 1863 to limit the ability to create further small local government districts, but those which had been created in 1862 and 1863 continued to exist.

Local government districts were reconstituted as urban districts under the Local Government Act 1894. Buglawton Urban District Council consisted of six elected members and five officers, the latter including a council clerk, a surveyor and a rate and rent collector. The council was responsible for quite a large geographical area, greater in size than the borough of Congleton at that time, but smaller in population and in buildings. Most of the 2,580 acres which comprised the parish and urban district of Buglawton was used for dairy farming and the council's area was generally more rural than industrial. The bulk of the population, however, lived and worked in the built-up area of Buglawton adjacent to the River Dane, immediately adjoining Congleton. This built-up part of Buglawton had been proposed for inclusion in the borough of Congleton by the government's boundary commissioners in 1837, but their recommendations were not implemented.

Buglawton Urban District was abolished in 1936, being absorbed into the borough of Congleton, save for a couple of minor boundary adjustments with Eaton and North Rode. In 1931 (the last census before its abolition) the parish and urban district of Buglawton had a population of 1,651.

== Notable residents ==
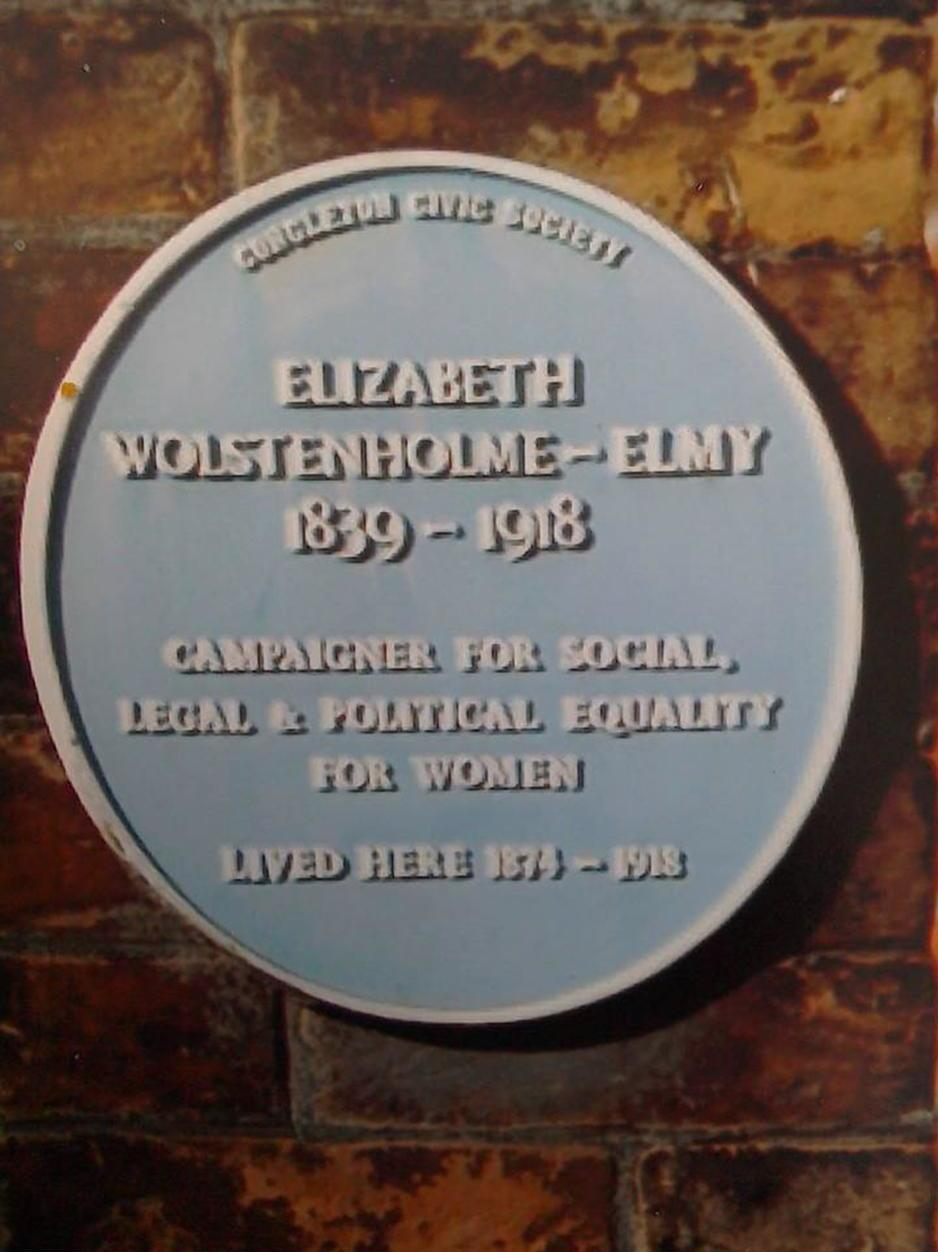
Blue plaque for Elizabeth Clarke Wolstenholme Elmy at 23 Buxton Road, Buglawton.

23 Buxton Road, Buglawton was the residence of Elizabeth Clarke Wolstenholme Elmy from 1874 to 1918 and a Blue Plaque was erected there for her by the Congleton Civic Society; it reads, "Elizabeth Wolstenholme-Elmy 1839-1918 Campaigner for social, legal and political equality for women lived here 1874-1918". Benjamin Elmy founded the Male Electors' League for Women's Suffrage in 1897, the first all male society to specifically campaign for women to have the vote. Elmy's son, Frank Elmy was elected to the Urban District Council in 1904 and was employed as assistant overseer and rate collector for Buglawton Urban District Council.

== See also ==
- Buglawton Hall
