= Blore =

Village in Staffordshire, England

Coordinates: 53°02′N 1°49′W

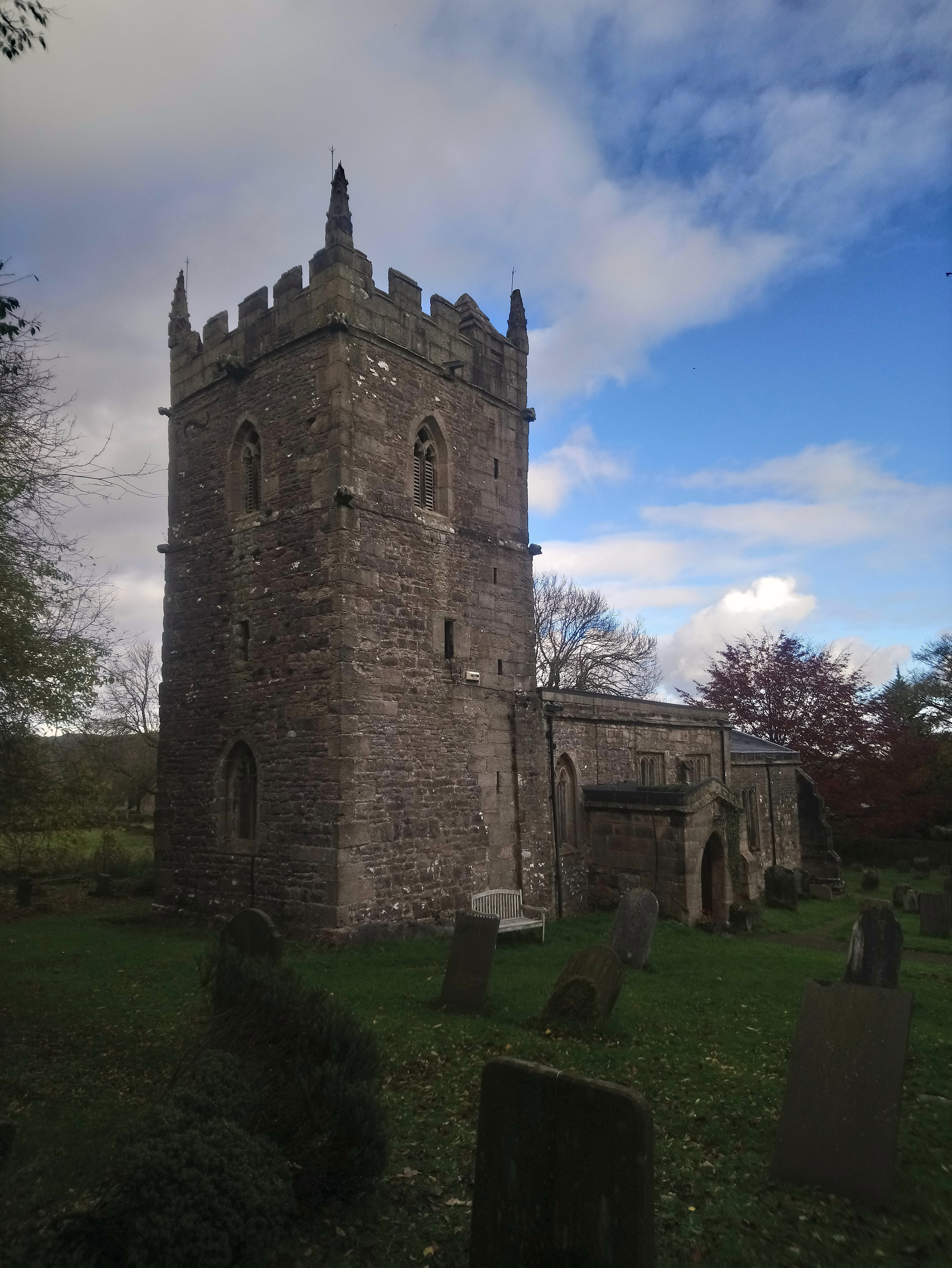
St Bartholomew's Church, Blore in 2020

Blore (grid reference SK137493) is a small village and parish in the Staffordshire Moorlands District of England.

It is on an acclivity above Dovedale, three and a half miles north west of Ashbourne, including the hamlet of Swinscoe, one mile (1.6 km) to the south and a part of the parochial chapelry of Calton.

The ecclesiastical parish is Blore Ray with Okeover and the civil parish is Blore-with-Swinscoe, both with slightly different boundaries. Blore parish, exclusive of the portion of Calton, contains about 2,000 acres (8 km^{2}) and 273 souls. Swinscoe contains about 1,000 acres (4 km^{2}).

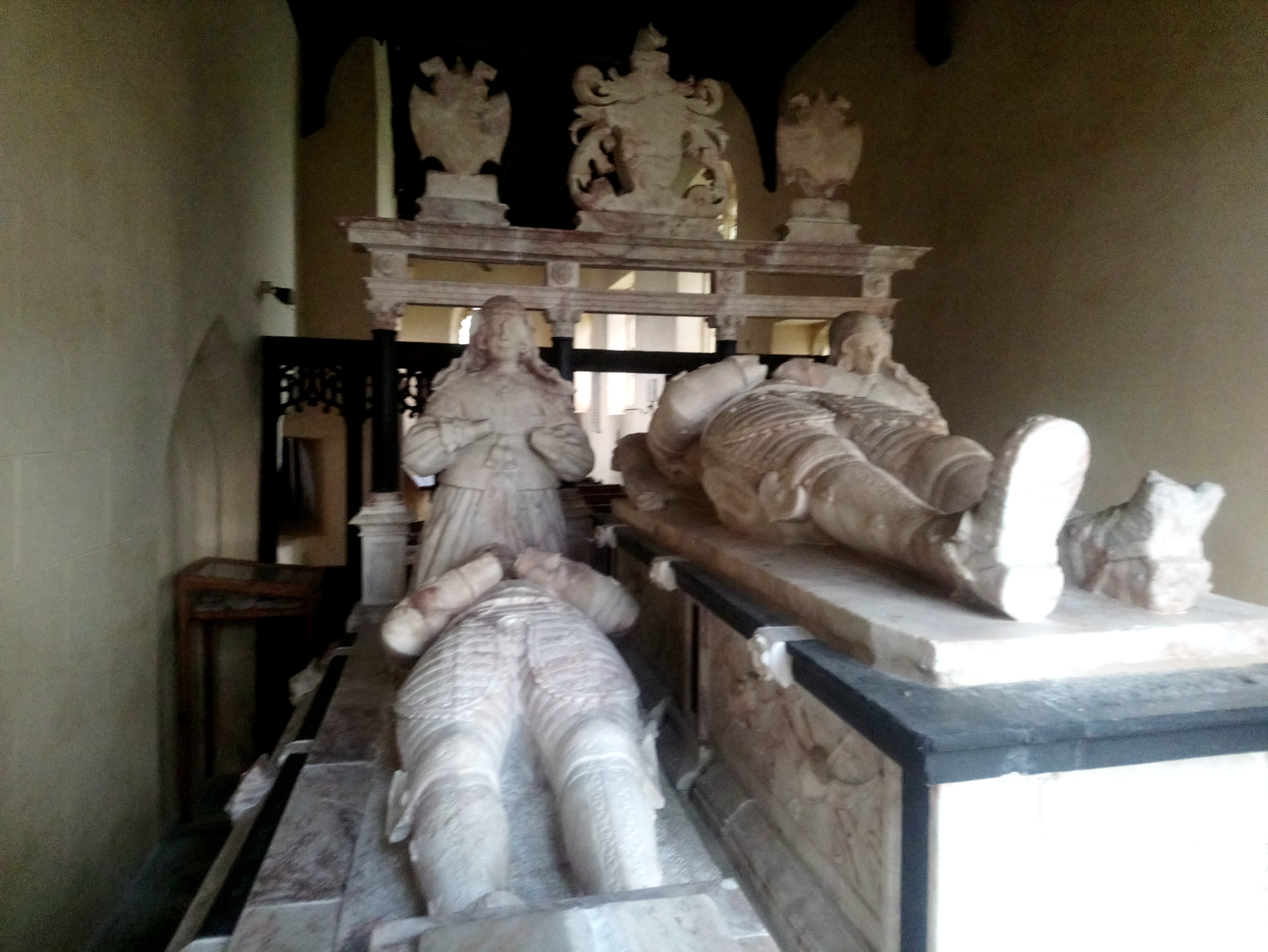
The Bassett tomb (Erected between 1618 and 1640)

The village of Blore comprises Blore Hall (now owned by the Holiday Property Bond), St Bartholomew's parish church, the Old Rectory, a few other houses and several farms. The hall was first mentioned in 1331, though only one building remains substantially unaltered since 1661. The Holiday Property Bond is a life assurance bond investment in securities and assets. Its 35,000 Bondholders have exclusive access to Blore Hall.

Blore Hall was the home of the Bassett family, (from whom the Queen is descended); William Bassett, the last of the male line, died in 1601 and his magnificent alabaster tomb, erected by his wife about 1630, can be seen in the church.

Blore Church was built around 1100 and is a Grade I listed building. Apart from the Bassett tomb, it has remained virtually unchanged for almost 400 years. It was extensively restored between 1994 and 1997.

== See also ==
- Listed buildings in Blore with Swinscoe
