= Stocco =

Stocco is a surname. Notable people with the surname include:

- Giampietro Stocco (born 1961), Italian author
- John Stocco (born 1983), former collegiate American football quarterback
