= Blore with Swinscoe =

Civil parish in Staffordshire, United Kingdom

Coordinates: 53°2′9″N 1°47′50″W

Blore with Swinscoe is a civil parish north-west of Ashbourne, in the Staffordshire Moorlands district of Staffordshire, England, on the edge of the Peak District National Park. According to the 2001 census, it had a population of 123, apparently declining to less than 100 according to the 2011 census. The parish includes Blore and Swinscoe.

== See also ==
- Listed buildings in Blore with Swinscoe
