= A523 road =

Road in England

A523

Route information
- Length: 31.9 mi (51.3 km)

Major junctions
- South end: A52
- A53; A54 A536 A537 A5149 A5143
- North end: A6, Hazel Grove

Location
- Country: United Kingdom
- Primary destinations: Leek; Macclesfield; Poynton

Road network
- Roads in the United Kingdom; Motorways; A and B road zones

The A523 is a road in Cheshire, Derbyshire, Greater Manchester, and Staffordshire, England running from a junction with the A52 north west of Ashbourne to the A555 near Woodford, passing through Leek and Macclesfield and near Poynton.

In March 2023, the Poynton Relief Road opened, taking the A523 west of Poynton across the former Woodford Aerodrome.
