= Acton, Staffordshire =

Hamlet in Staffordshire, England

Coordinates: 52.9689°N 2.2616°W

Acton
- Location within Staffordshire
- OS grid reference: SJ825413
- District: Newcastle-under-Lyme
- Shire county: Staffordshire
- Region: West Midlands
- Country: England
- Sovereign state: United Kingdom
- Post town: Newcastle, Staffs
- Postcode district: ST5
- Dialling code: 01782
- Police: Staffordshire
- Fire: Staffordshire
- Ambulance: West Midlands
- UK Parliament: Stafford

Acton is a hamlet in the Borough of Newcastle-under-Lyme, Staffordshire.

It lies within the civil parish of Whitmore, four miles south west of Newcastle close to the junction of the A53 and the A5182, Trentham Road.

Newcastle-under-Lyme District Council has an open windrow facility in Acton where it composts garden waste collected in the borough into a nutrient rich soil improver for local farms and other places including Trentham Gardens.

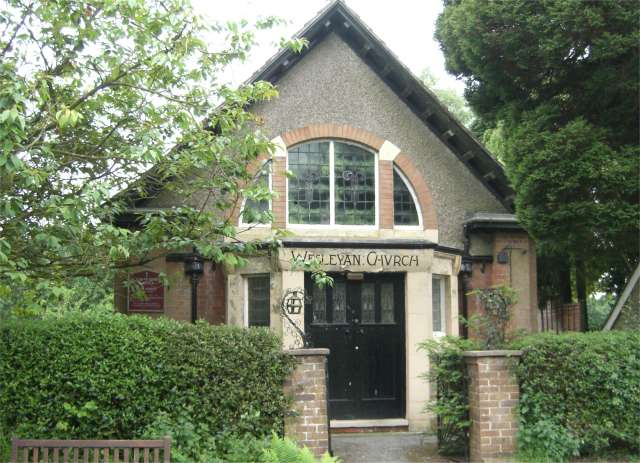
Wesleyan Church, Acton

There is a redundant church in the village bearing the inscription Wesleyan Church. It is now a private house. The Acton Hall Equestrian Centre is located in the village too.
