= Havannah, Cheshire =

Coordinates: 53.17821°N 2.19618°W

Havannah near Congleton in Cheshire, England, is a former industrial and residential area and was at one time known as 'the deserted village'.

It was established by local industrialist Charles Roe and named to commemorate the British capture of Havana in Cuba in 1762.

The area used water power from the River Dane. There were copper and brass works and a corn mill, and cigars were made there. There were also cottages, and a modern housing development has been built in the area. A modern hydro power project began in 2019, using the 4m high weir at Havannah.
