= Swinscoe =

Hamlet in Staffordshire, England

Coordinates: 53°1′55″N 1°49′4″W

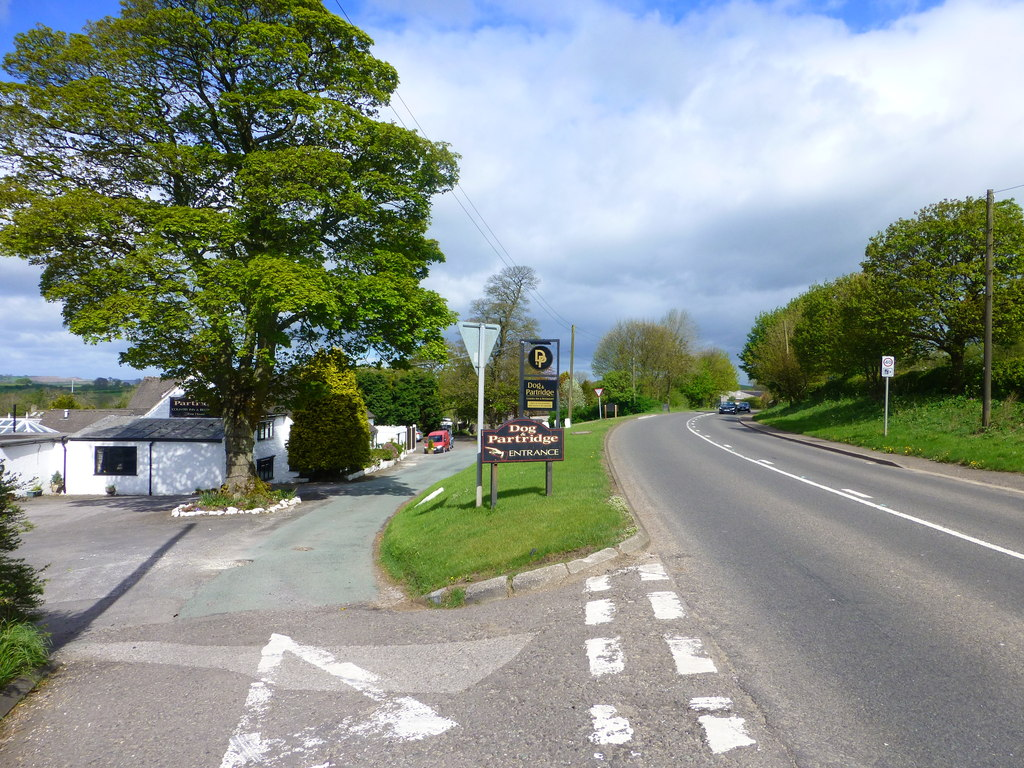
The Dog and Partridge public house in Swinscoe.

Swinscoe is a small hamlet within the Staffordshire Moorlands in Staffordshire, England. Administratively, the hamlet is part of the civil parish of Blore with Swinscoe.
