= B roads in Zone 5 of the Great Britain numbering scheme =

The numbering zones for roads in Great Britain

B roads are numbered routes in Great Britain of lesser importance than A roads. See the article Great Britain road numbering scheme for the rationale behind the numbers allocated.

== Zone 5 (3 digits) ==
Road	From	To	Notes
B500	A40 at Holborn Circus	A1 at Barbican tube station	Charterhouse Street and Long Lane around Smithfield Market
B501	A401 at Islington	B500 Charterhouse Street, Smithfield Market	St John Street, except for the section north of Rosebery Avenue which is part of the A401
B502	A4200 at Russell Square	B144 Bath Street in Finsbury	This road is split into two parts by the A201 and A401 at Mount Pleasant
B503 (defunct)	A401 at Mount Pleasant	A501 at Kings Cross	Now part of the A201.
B504	A5202 at St Pancras	B502 at Bloomsbury	Northern section passes St Pancras International on the west side and is southbound-only for through traffic.
B505 (defunct)	A40 at Oxford Circus	A400 at Camden	Upgraded to a portion of the A4201, but that was later rerouted onto the parallel Portland Place instead of Great Portland Street, returning it to Class II status, but it became the B506 instead of the B505. The section along Mortimer Street is now part of the A5204.
B506	Marylebone Road	Russell Square	Great Portland Street and Mortimer Street east of Regent Street. Originally ran between the A5 and A400 (paralleling the A40), with a multiplex with the B505 at the western end of Mortimer Street. The B505 was upgraded to the A4201, and the section of B506 west of the B505 was also upgraded, probably to the A5204. The B506 was extended along the old route of the A4201 when it was rerouted along Portland Place. The remainder of the original B506 is now part of an extended A5204. The original route was also extended further east and when that became the A4201, the extension remained, dividing the route into two sections.
B507	A501 at Marylebone	B510 at Kilburn	Lisson Grove and includes the famous Abbey Road
B508 (defunct)	A5 in Maida Vale	B505 (now A4201) near Camden	Upgraded to the A5205, likely early on because the number fits into the original system (four-digit A roads in central London were numbered Ax2xx).
B509	A502 at Chalk Farm	A5 at Kilburn	Adelaide Road and Belsize Road, passes through Swiss Cottage
B510	A41 at Child's Hill (Fortune Green)	A5 at Kilburn	Along Fortune Green Road and West End Lane through West Hampstead. Terminates at Quex Road while Abbey Road is the B507
B511	A41 at Swiss Cottage	A502 at Hampstead tube station	Fitzjohns Avenue and some of Heath Street
B512	A400 at Mornington Crescent tube station	A5202 at St Pancras Hospital	Crowndale Road
B513 (defunct)	A501 near Kings Cross station	B519 Waterlow Park	Originally ended at the B514. The sections along Dartmouth Park Hill and Randell's Road are unclassified and the remainder is part of the A5200.
B514	A5200 York Way, King's Cross	Caledonian Road, Barnsbury	Copenhagen Street
B515	A1 at Holloway	A1 at Islington	Liverpool Road. Passes through residential Islington. As this road is an alternative to the A1, it attracts rat-runners, therefore a 20 mph speed limit has been introduced throughout with traffic calming (speed humps) to enforce it.
B516 (defunct)	A503 in Holloway, London	A5203 in Holloway, London	Now part of the A503 one-way system.
B517	A502 in Chalk Farm	B518 Hampstead at the one-way system	This is an alternative route to Hampstead to the A502 that passes through Malden Road.
B518	A502 at Rosslyn Hill, Hampstead	A400 at Kentish Town station	Route runs along Pond Street, passing Gospel Oak station and the Royal Free Hospital, and runs close to the southern border of Hampstead Heath.
B519	A502 at Jack Straw's Castle, Hampstead	A1/A400 in Archway	Includes a spur along North Road to the A1.
B520	A5 in Kilburn, London	B510 in Kilburn, London	Iverson Road
B521	A40 at Holborn Circus	A5201 Clerkenwell Road	Hatton Garden
B522 (defunct)	A40 in St Giles	A400 in Euston	Much of route now part of the southbound route of the A400; the section along North Gower Street is now unclassified and its northern end closed to traffic.
B523 (defunct)	A5024 at Portman Square	A41 Park Road near Regents Park	Now part of the northbound route of the A41.
B524	A41 Baker Street	A40 Oxford Street	Paddington Street, Paddington Street Gardens, Marylebone High Street, Thayer Street, James Street
B525	Swiss Cottage	Regent's Park	Avenue Road
B526	A422 at Newport Pagnell	A45/A508 junction, Northampton	Parallel to M1 motorway (formerly part of the A50)
~~B527~~	unused		
B528 (defunct)	A5 in Hockliffe	A418 in Woburn	Originally part of the A506 (later A50). Now part of the A4012.
B529 (defunct)	B5219 in Moss Side	A560 at Wythenshawe	Shown as B5290 on a 1932 map, but is likely a typo. Upgraded to the A5103 by 1934.
B530	Fancott, Bedfordshire	A6/A421, Bedford	The only direct link between Flitwick/Ampthill and Bedford. Section between Flitwick and the M1 Junction 12 forms part of the A5120
B531	A5134 at Kempston, Bedfordshire	A5141 in Bedford town centre	Straight for its entire length
~~B532~~ - ~~B539~~	unused		
B540	B519 Highgate Village, North London	A103 Crouch End	Heads along Hornsey Lane, over the A1 at the Archway Bridge
~~B541~~ - ~~B549~~	unused		
B550	B519 Highgate Village, North London	A1000 Whetstone, London	Southwood Lane, Muswell Hill Road, Muswell Hill Broadway, Colney Hatch Lane and Friern Barnet Lane
B551	A41 at Hendon	A502 at Brent Green, Hendon	Along Queens Road
B552	A504 at Hendon	A411 at Arkley	Runs through North Hendon and Mill Hill Village, runs along the A5109 for a short while at Highwood Hill, then up Hendon Wood Lane to Arkley.
B553 (defunct)	A5 in Edgware	A1 in Whetstone	Upgraded to the A5109, likely in the 1940s.
B554 (defunct)	B553 (now A5109) at Highwood Hill	A411 at Barnet Gate	Renumbered as a northern extension of the B552.
B555 (defunct)	A5 north of Radlett	A414 in Hatfield	Section between Colney Heath and Hatfield became the A5092 (later A555, now A1) in 1926 when the Barnet bypass opened. Renumbered to B556 in 1935, probably to avoid confusion with the Barnet bypass which was given the A555 number.
B556	A1000 and A111 at Potters Bar	A5183 north of Radlett	Previously ran between Dunstable and Ampthill (partially now A5120).
B557 (defunct)	A5 near Fenny Stratford	A6 in Bedford	Section north of the M1 became the A5140 (later A421, now C94), the section along the Bedford bypass became a portion of the B531 and the section south of the M1 was declassified with the growth of nearby Milton Keynes.
B558 (defunct)	A506 (later A50) in Woburn Sands	B557 in Apsley Hill	Declassified sometime after the 1970s.
B559 (defunct)	B557 in Church End	A418 in Husborne Crawley	Was a portion of the A507; now declassified.
B560	A422 at Stagsden, Bedfordshire	A5134 at Kempston, Bedfordshire	
B561 (defunct)	B557 in Kempston	A428 in Bromham	Except for the easternmost end, it was renumbered B562 (later A5134) in 1935. The easternmost end (which was never upgraded to an A road) is now part of the B531. After this section of the A5134 was downgraded in 2009 due to construction of the A418 Bedford western bypass, the route west to Kempston Church End became the B560 and the remainder declassified.
B563 (defunct)	B557 in Bedford	A6 in Bedford	Upgraded to Class I status as the A5141.
B564 (defunct)	B563 in Bedford	A6 in Bedford	Declassified; the eastern half is now pedestrianized.
B565	A509 at Olney, Buckinghamshire	A428 at Cold Brayfield, Buckinghamshire	
B566 (defunct)	A43 in Northampton	A43 in Northampton	Became a portion of the B567, forming half a ring road. Now part of the A5123 relief road.
B567 (defunct)	A428 in Northampton	A43 in Northampton	The section along Spencer Bridge Road and Grafton Street is now part of the A428 and the remainder is now the A5123.
B568	Welford Road, Leicester	London Road, Leicester	Originally ran between Northampton and Leicester (now A5199 and A5095).
B569	Old A6 at Rushden	A509 at Wollaston near Wellingborough	
B570	B569 near Irchester	A509 near Little Irchester	
B571	A5128 in Wellingborough	A6 Irthlingborough bypass	Originally ended at the A5193 (formerly A45), but was extended west to its current terminus in the mid-1920s.
B572	A5128 in Wellingborough	Wellingborough railway station	Originally began at the A510.
B573 (defunct)	A45 (now A5128) Northampton Road, Wellingborough	A510 (now A5128) Finedon Road, Wellingborough	Renumbered B5386 for unknown reasons, but is now unclassified.
B574	A509 in Great Harrowden	A509 at Hill Top	Loop serving Little Harrowden
B575	A6003 in Kettering	Kettering railway station	
B576	A6 Desborough bypass	A14 J3 in Rothwell	Much of route formerly A6.
B577 (defunct)	A5 at High Cross	B411 (later A427) in Lutterworth	Declassified sometime after the 1990s.
B578	B4669 east of Hinckley	A5 near Smockington	
B579	A505/A6 spur in Luton	B5120 in Toddington	Originally ran from Hinckley to Sapcote (now B590 and B4669).
B580 (defunct)	A447 (now B4667) in Hinckley	A47 (now B590) in Hinckley	Declassified after Hinckley was bypassed.
B581	A47 Earl Shilton bypass near Elmesthorpe	A426 at Dunton Bassett	Originally classified as "Barwell Fields - Earl Shilton", connecting the A447 and A47 through Barwell to the north of Hinckley, and was extended to Dunton Bassett in the mid-1920s. By 1932, the original section was upgraded to Class I status as the A5096, but was downgraded again in the 1960s, likely returning to the B581. The section west of the A47 Earl Shilton bypass (including the entire original section) was declassified after the bypass was built and is now a dead end after Elmsthrope Lane was split by the bypass.
B582	A447 at Belcher's Bar	A6030 in Stoneygate	Originally started further south on the A447, at Osbaston Toll Gate and ran east to meet the B585 on the edge of Newbold Verdon (this is now unclassified) and originally continued to the A47 in Thurnby (a portion of this is now the B568).
B583 (defunct)	A46 (now A5460) in Leicester	A6 in Leicester	Upgraded to Class I status in the 1960s as the A5125 (later A46). Declassified after the A46 was rerouted, but the northernmost section is now part of the A6 and the section north of the A50 is now the B5327.
B584 (defunct)	A444/A5 in Caldecote	A483 near Measham	Section south of Twycross became a northern extension of the A444 and the northern section became the B4116.
B585	A447 near Cadeby, Leicestershire	A511 between Coalville and M1, Leicestershire	Rerouted; formerly via Coalville to A512 at Thringstone; this section now classified unnumbered
B586	A511 in Midway	A514 in Swadlincote	Route south of Swadlincote to Ibstock now unclassified.
B587	A514 near Stanton by Bridge, Derbyshire	A511 east of Ashby-de-la-Zouch, Leicestershire	Rerouted; formerly, via Whitwick to A50 at Markfield; this section now classified unnumbered
B588 (defunct)	A6 at Hathern, Leicestershire	A512 south of Shepshed, Leicestershire	Declassified sometime after the 1990s.
B589	A6 in Loughborough	A60 in Loughborough	Originally ran along Broad Street from the A512 to the A6, but this was declassified around 1980. The current B589 follows the former A6004 on the wrong side of the A6, putting the B589 out-of-zone.
B590	Rugby Road in Hinckley	Rugby Road in Hinckley	Inner town loop around Hinckley; one section is former B5402.
B591	A512 south of Shepshed, Leicestershire	A50 west of M1 Junction 22, Leicestershire	Rerouted; incorporates sections of former B5330 and B5350. Formerly: east (from near Copt Oak) to A6 at Quorn, Leicestershire, and west from A50 to Ibstock and beyond; both these sections now unnumbered classified roads.
~~B592~~ - ~~B599~~	unused		

== B5000 to B5099 ==
Road	From	To	Notes
B5000	A513 at Tamworth	B4116 at Pinwall, near Atherstone	
B5001 (defunct)	Tamworth	Tamworth railway station	Declassified between 1978 and 1996 when the Offa Drive section of the A513 opened.
B5002 (defunct)	A444 in Acresford	B4116 north of Snarestone	Declassified after 1992.
B5003 (defunct)	A50 and A453 in Ashby de la Zouch	A444 in Overseal	Declassified, probably due to the nearby A42.
B5004 (defunct)	A444 in Overseal	A514 and A50 (now A511) in Woodville	Declassified in the 2000s. Number also shown on some maps as a route near Castle Donington; this was a typo for the A5003.
B5005 (defunct)	A444 at Cadley Hill	A514 near Woodville	Became a portion of a rerouted A514 between 1995 and 1997 when William Nadin Way opened east of Swadlincote.
B5006	B586 at Measham	A514 at Ticknall	
B5007 (defunct)	A514 in Ticknall	A514 in Stanton by Bridge	Became a portion of a rerouted A514 in the early 1970s.
B5008	Winshill, Staffordshire	A50/A38 north of Willington, Derbyshire	
B5009	A5 at Gobowen bypass	A5 near Queen's Head	Former routing of the A5. Originally ran from the A516 in Hilton to the A514 in Swarkestone; this was upgraded to the A5132 between January 1969 and 1971.
B5010	A50 at Cavendish Bridge, Leicestershire	Shirwin Arms Roundabout, A52, Bramcote, Nottinghamshire	via Borrowash, Derbyshire
B5011	A5 and A5195 in Brownhills	A452 in Brownhills	Originally ran from the B5012 south along Chasetown High Street and Hanney Hay Road to the A5; the section past Triangle was rerouted by 1928 along Ogley Hay Road to the A5 at Middleston Bridge. Around 1986 the B5011 was extended south of the A5 to the A452 in Brownhills. This now out-of-zone section is all that remains of the B5011 as the section north of the A5 was declassified (and replaced by the A5195) due to completion of the M6 Toll.
B5012	A34 Ringway in Cannock	A449 at Penkridge, Staffordshire	
B5013	A51 at Rugeley, Staffordshire	A518 near Uttoxeter, Staffordshire	Crosses Blithfield Reservoir causeway
B5014	A515 near Lichfield, Staffordshire	B5013 at Abbots Bromley, Staffordshire	Joins the A513 at Handsacre
B5015	A513 in Lichfield	B5014 in Lichfield	
B5016	A515 in Yoxall	A38 in Barton Turn	
B5017	B5018 in Burton upon Trent	A518 in Uttoxeter	
B5018	A5121 in Burton upon Trent	A5121 in Burton upon Trent	Portion of route formerly A38
B5019	A460 at Rugeley, Staffordshire	B5012 near Penkridge, Staffordshire	Historically ran through the Littleover area in Derby; this was renumbered to B5021 sometime after the 1960s.
B5020	A6 at Kirk Langley, Derbyshire	A516 at Mickleover, Derby	
B5021	B5020 at Mickleover, Derby	Littleover, Derby	Only 1 km long; formerly the B5019. Originally ran between the B6000 and A516 in Derby city center; now unclassified and partly pedestrianized, as it is completely inside Derby's inner ring road.
B5022 (defunct)	A516 in Derby	A61 in Derby	Became a portion of the A601 ring road in 1972.
B5023	A6 at Duffield, Derbyshire	A5012 (Via Gellia) east of Ible	By way of Idridgehay and Wirksworth
B5024 (defunct)	B5023 east of Windley	A517 in Turnditch	Declassified in the 1990s.
B5025 (defunct)	A449 (now A34) in Stafford	Stafford railway station	Much of route now declassified and pedestrianized; a short stretch over the bridge over the River Sow is now part of the A518.
B5026	A34 in Stone, Staffordshire	A51 in Pipe Gate, Shropshire	Main Road from Stone to Eccleshall
B5027	A520 in Stone, Staffordshire	A518 in Uttoxeter, Staffordshire	Starts at Stone High Street and also has a spur that meets the A51 in Stone.
B5028 (defunct)	Market Place, Uttoxeter	A518 in Uttoxeter	Later used for an old routing of A50 through Uttoxeter, although it used Silver Street instead of Back Lane. Both routes now unclassified.
B5029	A521 at Blythe Bridge	A520 at Meir Heath	
B5030	A522 at Uttoxeter	B5032 at Ellastone	
B5031	B5030 at Rocester	B5032 at Denstone	Via Wirksworth
B5032	A522 at Cheadle	A52 at Hanging Bridge	
B5033	B5032 at Ellastone	A515 at Darley Moor	
B5034	A515 Buxton Road, Ashbourne	A515 at Ashbourne Market Place	Unsigned; some maps mark the route as a portion of the B5035.
B5035	A515 at Ashbourne	B6013 at Fourlane Ends	Via Wirksworth. Originally continued to the A61 at Alfreton; this became the A615 in the 1960s.
B5036	B5023 at Wirksworth	A5012 at Cromford	Originally continued to the A6; this is now part of the A5012.
B5037 (defunct)	B5028 in Dresden	A50 near Normacot	Upgraded to the A5035 in the 1960s; western section is now part of the B5038 after that road was swapped with the A5035 and the eastern section is now declassified as it only provides residential access.
B5038	A34 at Trentham, Stoke-on-Trent	A519 at Hanchurch	Only 1 mile long; used as a shortcut to M6 J15
B5039	A50 Longton bypass	A5272 at Adderley Green	
B5040 (defunct)	A52 in Bucknall	A520 in Weston Coyney	Renumbered (along with the B5049) to the A5272.
B5041	A34 in Trent Vale	A52 in Stoke-upon-Trent	Originally ran along Wharf Street. Swapped with the A5006 when the M6 was built; the section along Wharf Street became the A500 in 1977. In the early 1980s, the route was cut back to Fleming Road and the remainder became a portion of the A52 one-way system.
B5042 (defunct)	A52 in Stoke-in-Trent	A5006 in Stoke-on-Trent	Renumbered as a spur of the A52 due to completion of the A500 and rerouting of traffic away from Stoke town center; the northern end is now gone, lost under the A500.
B5043 (defunct)	A519 in Newcastle-under-Lyme	A34/A527 in Newcastle-under-Lyme	Became a portion of a rerouted A519 in the 1990s (the old route of the A519 was declassified).
B5044	A525 at Keele, Staffordshire	Newcastle-under-Lyme	
B5045	A52 in Newcastle-under-Lyme	A5006 in Shelton, Stoke-on-Trent	Originally appeared on a 1932 map between Woodseaves and Great Bridgeford, near Stafford. This was a typo for the B5405.
B5046	A53 at Etruria	A5006 at Shelton	Appears on some maps as B5040.
B5047	A50 Potteries Way, Hanley	A5272 Keelings Road, Birches Head	
B5048 (defunct)	Town Road, Hanley	Stafford Street, Hanley	Declassified and pedestrianized in the 1980s.
B5049 (defunct)	A527 in Great Chell	A5008 in Northwood	Renumbered (along with the B5040) to the A5272.
B5050	B5051 at Burslem	A53 at Cobridge	Originally started in Swan Square, but was rerouted along Woodbank Street in 1991.
B5051	A5271 in Longport	A53 in Endon	
B5052 (defunct)	Scotia Road, Tunstall	Victoria Park Road, Tunstall	Declassified after the 1980s due to road improvements in Tunstall and completion of Scotia Road.
B5053	A515 south of Buxton	Froghall	
B5054	A515	B5053 north of Warslow, Staffordshire.	
B5055	A515 west of Monyash	Bakewell	By way of Over Haddon; originally ran from the A515 in Newhaven to the B5036 in Cromford. This was renumbered to the A5012 in 1935.
B5056	A6 west of Rowsley, Derbyshire	A515 south of Fenny Bentley	By way of Longcliffe, Grangemill (crosses A5012) and Winster
B5057	A632 south of Chesterfield	B5056 west of Winster	
B5058 (defunct)	Church Street, Leek	Stockwell Street, Leek	Became a portion of a rerouted A523 (the original route of the A523 was declassified and is now partially pedestrianized).
B5059	A53 in Burbage	A6 south of Buxton	
B5060 (defunct)	Snedshill	Donnington	Reassigned in 1932 to the former north–south routing of the A5 (the original east–west route became the B5406, later the A5266); now unclassified.
B5060 (defunct)	M54 at Priorslee	A518 in Muxton	Renumbered to the A4640 in 2008.
B5061	A5 in Telford, Shropshire	B4380 near Atcham and Wroxeter, Shropshire	Mostly follows the original route of the end of Watling Street. Originally ran from Wellington to the A5 southwest of town; upgraded to the A5223 around 1980, then declassified before 1982.
B5062	A5112 at Sundorne, Shrewsbury	A41 near Newport, Shropshire	Intersects the A49 (the Shrewsbury by-pass) and A442
B5063	A495 at Welshampton, near Ellesmere, Shropshire	A442 near Wellington, Shropshire	Intersects the A49, A53 and passes through Wem
B5064 (defunct)	Whitchurch	Shrewsbury	Became a portion of a rerouted A49 after World War II.
B5064 (defunct)	A49/B5062 at Heathgates Roundabout, Ditherington	A458 at Abbey Foregate	Renumbered to A5112 in the early 1970s.
B5066	A34 Queensway at Stafford	A520 Windmill Road at Meir Heath, Staffordshire	Intersects the A513 and A51; originally ran southeast of Whitchurch between the A529 (now A41) and the A442 (now B5065). Shown unnumbered on the 1932 Ten Mile map and had become a portion of the A442 in the 1935 renumbering. Declassified in the 2000s after the A53 Hodnet bypass was built.
B5067	B4397 near Baschurch	A528 in Shrewsbury	
B5068	A495 Victoria Street in Ellesmere	B5069 in St Martin's	
B5069	A41 at Hampton Heath, Cheshire	A483 south of Oswestry, Shropshire	By way of Malpas, Worthenbury, Bangor-on-Dee and Overton-on-Dee. Although this road starts and ends in England much of it is in Wales.
B5070	St Martin's, Shropshire	A5 north of Chirk, Clwyd	
B5071	A534 in Crewe, Cheshire	A529 near Hatherton	
B5072	M54 Junction 5	A5223 at Lawley	Originally ran along Park Road between the then-A464 and A530 south of Nantwich. Became a portion of a rerouted A530 before World War II.
B5073 (defunct)	A530 north of Nantwich	A51 in Burford	Upgraded to a rerouted A51; the southernmost section is now part of the B5074.
B5074	A54 at Winsford	A500/A51 at Nantwich	
B5075	A559 at Northwich, Cheshire	A559 at Higher Marston, Cheshire	Originally ran along Edleston Road in Crewe between the A5019 and the A534. Upgraded to Class I status as the A5078 in the late 1920s; the northernmost section is now unclassified as it is within the Crewe town center relief road.
B5076	A530 at Bradfield Green, Cheshire	A532 in Crewe	
B5077	A532 at Crewe Green, Cheshire	A5011 in Alsager, Cheshire	
B5078	A533 north of Alsager	M6 J16	Split into two sections by B5077
B5079	A533 at Elworth, Cheshire	Wheelock, Cheshire	
B5080	B5000 in Stoneydelph	B5404 in Quarry Hill	Originally ran along New Road from the A54 in Winsford to Winsford & Over station; declassified, likely in 1931 after the station closed to passengers.
B5081	A50 south of Knutsford, Cheshire	Middlewich	
B5082	A559 at Northwich, Cheshire	A50 between Cranage and Allostock	
B5084 (defunct)	A537 in Knutsford	B5085 in Knutsford	Now part of the B5085.
B5085	A537 at Knutsford, Cheshire	A34 at Alderley Edge, Cheshire	
B5086	B5085 at Alderley Edge, Cheshire	A538 at Wilmslow, Cheshire	Route of A34 south of Wilmslow town centre before Wilmslow bypass
B5087	A537 at Macclesfield, Cheshire	A535 at Alderley Edge, Cheshire	This road has now been 'extended' by re-classifying the bypassed section of the A34 in Alderley Edge to A5087 until the junction with the A535.
B5088	A536 at Macclesfield, Cheshire	A537 at Macclesfield, Cheshire	Oxford Road, runs from traffic lights at Park Lane / Ivy Lane junction to roundabout with A537.
B5089 (defunct)	A5024 in Macclesfield	A6 and A625 south of Whaley Bridge	Became a portion of an extended A5002 in the 1960s, but was later downgraded to the B5470.
B5090	Tytherington, Cheshire	Bollington Cheshire	Tytherington Lane, Bollington Road, Henshall Road, Wellington Road, Palmerston Street
B5091	A538 at Prestbury, Cheshire	B5090 in Bollington Cheshire	
B5092			Renumbering of the former A523 through Poynton after it was rerouted to bypass the town. Meets the original B5092 (now the A5102). Originally ran from Wilmslow to Poynton. The western section from Wilmslow to Woodford was upgraded to a portion of the A5102 in the early 1930s and the remainder was upgraded to the A5149 in the 1960s.
B5093	A5145 in Didsbury	A6 in Levenshulme	Originally began west of Chorlton-cum-Hardy; this became a portion of the A6010 in 1971 and the B5093 was extended south along a portion of former A34 (this section was part of the A526 before that). An earlier route ran from the B5092 in Woodford to the A6 in Stockport. This was upgraded to Class I status as the A5102 in the early 1930s.
B5094	B5358 in Stanley Green	A5149 in Bramhall	
B5095	A5149 northwest of Bramhall	A34 Kingsway in East Didsbury	Section through Cheadle Hulme is now part of the A5149.
B5096	B5605 in Rhosymedre	A539 in Acrefair	
B5097	A483 at Ruabon, Wrexham County Borough	A483 at Rhostyllen, Wrexham County Borough	By way of Rhosllanerchrugog
B5098	B5097 at Rhostyllen, Wrexham County Borough	A525 near Junction 4 A483, Wrexham	Through Bersham
B5099	B5089 at Bersham, Wrexham County Borough	A5152, Wrexham	

== B5100 to B5199 ==
Road	From	To	Notes
B5100	A534 in Rhosneni	A525 in Hightown	Exists in two sections, connected by a multiplex with the A5152.
B5101	B5425 in Rhosddu, Wrexham	A5104 at Treuddyn	
B5102	A525 at Minera	A534 at Holt	Section from Holt Cross to Holt is a former section of the A534.
B5103	A5 in Berwyn	A542 in Pentrefelin	
B5104 (defunct)	A494 at Clawdd Poncen	A549 near Broughton	Upgraded to Class I status with the same number in 1935.
B5104 (defunct)	Loop around Colwyn Bay town center		Renumbered as an extension of the B5113.
B5105	A5 at Cerrigydruidon	A494 in Ruthin	Originally ended at the A494 Well Street in Ruthin; this is now part of the A494.
B5106	A547 at Conwy	A5 at Betws-y-Coed	A mile south of Trefriw a spur crosses the River Conwy to join the A470 at Llanrwst
B5107	Caernarfon Road, Bangor	Holyhead Road, Bangor	Unsigned. Original loop route in Bangor is now the A5.
B5108	A5025 at Benllech	B5110 at Brynteg	Originally ran from the A5/A5025 in Menai Bridge to the B5111 in Amlwch. This was upgraded to Class I status as an extension of the A5025 in the early 1930s. The southern end into Menai Bridge is now part of the B5420 after the A5025 was rerouted to meet the A5 (now A55) Llanfair PG bypass.
B5109	A5025 in Llanynghenedl	unclassified road in Llangoed	Originally ran from Llangefni to Beaumaris, but was soon extended to Llangoed. In 1935 it was extended west to Llanynghenedl, replacing a portion of the B5112.
B5110	A5025 north of Benllech	Llangefni	By way of Marianglas and Brynteg
B5111	B5109 in Llangefni	A5025 in Burwen	Originally began at Llangristiolus and ran north to Llangefni, but this section became the A5114 after World War II. Section in Amlwch was formerly the A5025 (and B5113 before that).
B5112	A5 east of Bryngwran	B5111 in Llanerchymedd	Route south of Trefor was formerly the B4423. Route west of Trefor is now part of the B5109.
B5113	A547 in Colwyn Bay	A5 at Pentrefoelas	Crosses A548 and also, by way of Nebo Originally ran from the A5 in Valley to the B5111 on the western side of Amlwch. Upgraded to an extension of the A5025 by the end of the 1920s. The final section into Amlwch was renumbered to the B5111 in the 1940s.
B5114 (defunct)	Loop off A544 south of Llandudno		Originally began in Llanrhos and ran along Bryn Lupus Road and Deganwy Road to Deganwy and then along a rail line to Tywyn, connecting the A544 to itself. The northernmost section was declassified by 1932 and was instead routed to the A544 in the center of Deganwy. This new route was upgraded to Class I status as the A496 in 1935 and is now the A546. The original northern end to Llanrhos remains unclassified. Number also appears in the DfT Card Index from around 2002 on a route along Record Street in Ruthin, but no maps showing the route as a B road have been found.
B5115	A55 at Colwyn Bay	A546 at Tywyn	
B5116	B5115 in Llandrillo-yn-Rhôs	Promenade, Rhôs-on-Sea	
B5117	A34 in Chorlton-on-Medlock	A6010 in Rusholme	Passes through Manchester University. Originally A526 (and A34 after that). Originally ran from the A525 in Rhuddian to the A548 near Gronant. The section from Gronant to Prestatyn became an extension of the A548 by 1932 and the remainder was renumbered as an extension of the A547 in the 1950s.
B5118	Rhyl Coast Road, Rhyl	Wellington Road, Rhyl	
B5119	A5151 in Dyserth	A548 in Rhyl	
B5120	A547 in Prestatyn	A548 in Prestatyn	Originally ran along High Street, but this was closed to traffic; the route now runs along Ffordd Pendyffryn, Bridge Road and Bastion Road.
B5120	A505 at Dunstable	M1 J12	Downgraded western section of A5120; duplicate number
B5121	A541 at Nannerch	A548 in Greenfield	
B5122	A55 at Pantasaph	A541 at Afon-wen	
B5123	A55 J32A and A5026 at Pentre Halkyn	A541 southeast of Rhydymwyn	Via Rhosesmor Originally from the A494 King Street to the A549 Chester Street in Mold. Downgraded by the end of World War II; the southern section is now part of the A541, but the remainder is unclassified.
B5124	Blackpool, Lancashire	Bispham	Old route of A587 which was rerouted along the former B5264. Originally ran from the A494 north of Mold to the A548 in Flint. Due to its importance, it was upgraded to Class I status as the A5119 after World War II.
B5125	A5104 and A55 spur at Broughton	B5126 in Northop	Old routing of the A55. Originally ran from the A5119 south of Northop to the High Street in Northop. Declassified after the A55 North Wales Expressway was built.
B5126	B5129 in Connah's Quay	A5119 in Northrop	Section into Northrop formerly the A55.
B5127	A494/B5125 in Ewloe	A549 Windmill Road, Buckley	Section in Ewloe was formerly A494.
B5128	B5127 Liverpool Road, Buckley	A549 Brunswick Road, Spon Green	
B5129	A5104 at Saltney	A548 at Kelsterton	
B5130	A51/A5115 at Boughton, Chester	A528 at Cock Bank	
B5131 (defunct)	A529 (now A41) southeast of Chester	A51 (now A5116) west of Upton	Chester eastern bypass; rerouted in 1935 around Chistleton and to end closer to Moston than Upton. This new route was upgraded to Class I status as the A41 a few years later.
B5132	A41 at Eastham	A51 at Stamford Mill	
B5133	Hooton, Cheshire	A540 at Windle Hill, Cheshire	
B5134	Neston, Cheshire	A540 east of Neston	
B5135	Neston, Cheshire	A540 north of Neston	
B5136	Neston, Cheshire	A41 near Tranmere, Wirral	Includes section of former A41 bypassed by New Ferry/Rock Ferry bypass. All three roads at T-junction in New Ferry are B5136. Gap between Bebington and Clatterbridge accounted for by B5137 and B5151.
B5137	M53 at Bebington	A41 at Bromborough	
B5138	Heswall, Wirral	Thingwall, Wirral	
B5139	Upton, Wirral	A540 at West Kirby, Wirral, Merseyside	
B5140	Caldy, Wirral	B5139 at Frankby, Wirral, Merseyside	
B5141	Caldy, Wirral	A540 at West Kirby, Wirral, Merseyside	
B5142	A554 in Egremont	A551 in Liscard, Merseyside	
B5142	B5153 in Weaverham, Cheshire	A49 1 km north of Weaverham	Number duplicated
B5143	A554 in New Brighton, Merseyside	A551 in Liscard, Merseyside	
B5144	A554 in Seacombe, Merseyside	A551 in Seacombe, Merseyside	
B5144	B5153 in Weaverham, Cheshire	A49 south of Weaverham	Number duplicated
B5145	A551 in Wallasey, Merseyside	A551 in Seacombe, Merseyside	
B5146	A5030 in Birkenhead, Merseyside	A5029 in Birkenhead, Merseyside	
B5147	Birkenhead Central railway station, Merseyside	B5148 in Tranmere	A road with the same number appears on road signs at the junction of A462 and Bloxwich Road North in Willenhall, West Midlands. This is almost certainly a typo for the former B4157 which was declassified in the 1970s. The road signs were installed in 2012 replacing ones damaged in an accident.
B5148	A552 in Birkenhead, Merseyside	B5149 near Bebington, Merseyside	
B5149	A41 near Tranmere, Merseyside	B5136, Bebington, Merseyside	
B5150	B5151 at Higher Bebington	B5148 near Bebington	
B5151	Bidston, Merseyside	A540 south of Willaston, Cheshire	
B5152	Frodsham	Cotebrook	
B5153	B5152 south of Frodsham	A559 in Greenbank, Northwich	
B5154 (defunct)	A557 in Higher Runcorn	Weston Point	Declassified.
B5155	Silver Jubilee Bridge, Runcorn	Halton Brook	
B5165	A560 in Baguley, Greater Manchester	A56 in West Timperley, Altrincham	Has crossroads through the centre of Timperley between Thorley Lane, Park Road and Stockport Road
B5166	A538 roundabout, Wilmslow, Cheshire	A6144 in Ashton on Mersey, Greater Manchester	In Wilmslow, the first half mile is the old A34 road prior to the construction of the Wilmslow bypass
B5167	A560 in Baguley	B5093 in Withington	
B5168	A560/M56 J2 at Sharston	B5166 at Northenden	Sharston Road
B5169	A5145 in Heaton	B6167 in Reddish	Originally began at the A526 (later A34) in Didsbury; this is now part of the A5145.
B5170 (defunct)	A562 at Hale Bank	A561 at Garston	Rerouted slightly due to construction of the runway at Speke Airport. Much of route now unclassified; the section west of Speke is now part of the A561.
B5170 (defunct)	A51 Stafford Road near Lichfield	A38 in Lichfield	Lichfield eastern bypass, built in the 1970s. Renumbered to the A5192 between October 1983 and June 1985 (per OS maps).
B5171	B5178 in Gateacre	A561 in Garston, Liverpool	
B5172	B5136 at Rock Ferry, Merseyside	B5148 near Rock Ferry	Originally ran from the A57 in Knotty Ash to the A561 in Aigburth. This road ran along the southern section of Queen's Drive, now the Liverpool ring road. Became the southern half of the A5058; the original southern end is now declassified after the A5058 was rerouted along Victoria Road.
B5173	B5342 near Toxteth	A57 in Kensington	
B5174	B5342 Ullet Road, Liverpool	B5175	
B5175	A562 near Toxteth	A562 near Sefton Park, Liverpool	
B5176	A5037 Grafton Street, Liverpool	A5036 Sefton Street, Liverpool	
B5177	A561 in Toxteth	B5175 in Toxteth	Upper Warwick Street
B5178	Edge Hill	A562 east of Widnes	
B5179	A562 in Wavertree	A5080 near Old Swan	
B5180	A562 near Mossley Hill	B5171 in Allerton	Mather Avenue Originally ran from the A5047 at Broad Green to the A562 at Penketh (now part of Warrington). Upgraded to Class I status as the A5080 by 1932.
B5181	A536 Park Lane in Macclesfield, Cheshire	A537 in Macclesfield	Churchill Way Originally ran along Victoria Street in Liverpool. Now unclassified, although some maps show the eastern end still as the B5181.
B5182	A5046 Tithebarn Street, Liverpool	A5053 Leeds Street, Liverpool	Runs along Pall Mall; continued to the A59, but this junction is now gone after the Kingsway Tunnel approach road was built and was shortened to the A5038. The B5182 was cut back to its current route in the 1990s.
B5183 (defunct)	B5182 Pall Mall, Liverpool	A565 Great Howard Street, Liverpool	Declassified.
B5184 (defunct)	A5046 Great Crosshall Street, Liverpool	A59 Great Scotland Street, Liverpool	Spilt in two by the A5053 and now unclassified. The northern end is now gone, lost under the approach roads to the Kingsway Tunnel.
B5185 (defunct)	B5184 Marybone, Liverpool	A5038 Vauxhall Road, Liverpool	Ran along Banastre Street; now part of the A5053, which wiped out the road.
B5186	A5047 in Liverpool	A59 at Kirkdale, Liverpool	St Anne Street and Norton Street
B5187	Norris Green, Merseyside	Black Bull, Merseyside	
B5188	A57 Kensington, Liverpool	A5049 Rocky Lane, Anfield	Originally continued to the A59 in Kirkdale; this is now part of the A5089.
B5189	A5049 at Tuebrook	A5080 at Broadgreen	Split by A57 at Old Swan
B5190	A5058 Balliol Road, Bootle	A5057 Merton Road, Bootle	Oriel Road, Bootle; originally began at the A5036 and ended at the A564, these sections are now the A5057 and A5058.
B5191 (defunct)	A5036 Regent Road, Bootle	A564 Stanley Road, Bootle	Much of route now unclassified; the section just east of the A565 and the spur along Irlam Street are now part of the A5057.
B5192	Loop off A506 in Kirkby		Originally began at the A59 south of Aintree to the A577 in Skelmersdale. The route was split in two by the M57 and expansion of Kirkby and a new relief road was built through Kirkby. Part of the eastern section became part of the A506 (much of which is now the M58). The remainder of the route was upgraded to Class I status as a western extension of the A506 while the final section into Skelmersdale is now the B5312. The current B5192 (itself a portion of the original B5192) in Kirkby dates from the 2000s, although with a new southern end as the original has been lost under the M57.
B5192	A585 near Wesham	A583 near Kirkham	Originally the A585 and A583 (later A585) before they were rerouted onto bypasses.
B5192	A5027 Upton bypass near Upton, Wirral	B5139 in West Kirby, Wirral	Designated around 2005. B5192 is the only number duplicated three times.
B5193	Crosby	Ince Blundell, Merseyside	
B5194	M57 J4 near Croxteth, Merseyside	M57 J2 near Prescot, Merseyside	
B5195	Formby, Merseyside	A59 near Ormskirk	
B5196 (defunct)	Maghull	Scarisbrick	Upgraded to the A598 in the 1920s, then renumbered to an extension of the-then A567 and is now the A5147.
B5196 (defunct)	A534 Congleton Road, Sandbach	A533 in Hightown	Declassified in the 1980s due to completion of the Sandbach bypass as the road had no classified roads to connect to.
B5197	A506 near Moss Side	B5319 in Ormskirk	
B5198	A57 Liverpool Road, Fincham	A526 at Stockbridge	May not actually exist; originally continued to the B5194 (this section has been split in two by the A526), this is now a spur of the B5194.
B5199	A58/M57 J2 near Prescot	A5080 at Huyton, Merseyside	

== B5200 to B5299 ==
Road	From	To	Notes
B5200	Prescot, Merseyside	Prescot	West Street — Kemble Street
B5201	A57 at Whiston Hospital, Merseyside	B5205 at Crank, near Rainford	
B5202	A580 near Kirkby, Merseyside	B5194 in Knowsley (village)	Only approx. 1 km long
B5203	A570 near Rainford, Merseyside	B5201 at Gillar's Green near Eccleston	
B5204	B5413 near Rainhill, Merseyside	A572 near Earlestown	
B5205	B5203 in Rainford, Merseyside	A571 in Billinge	
B5206	Orrell, Greater Manchester	A571 near Billinge	
B5207	A571 at Billinge	A574 at Culcheth	
B5207	A5036 at Netherton	A565 at Thornton	Duplicated number, former A5207.
B5208	A5267 in Birkdale, Merseyside	A565, Southport, Merseyside	Originally ran from Blackbrook to Old Boston. Upgraded to the A599 by 1932.
B5209	A572 at Haydock	A599 at Newton-le-Willows	
B5210	Lythgoes Lane, Warrington	Longford Street, Warrington	Originally began at the A57 and ended at the-then A574. The route along Priestley Street is now part of a rerouted A57, the section along Froghall Lane, Tanners Lane and Pinners Brow is now unclassified (although some maps show it as the B5210) and the section along Marsh House Lane is now part of the A574, leaving only the section along Orford Lane as part of the B5210.
B5210	M6 J21, Martinscroft	A574 in Fearnhead	Duplicate number. Appears on the DfT Roads List as the B5310, but this is a typo.
B5211	M60 J13, Worsley	A5181 in Stretford	Originally ran from the A49 in Longford to the-then A574 in Padgate. Now a portion of a rerouted A50.
B5212	A57 at Hollins Green	A574 iat Culcheth	
B5213	B5158 at Flixton	A5145/A5181 at Stretford	Originally began at the A57 (now B5320) in Irlam (with a ferry across the Manchester Ship Canal); this section is now part of the B5158.
B5214	B5213 in Urmston	A576/A5081 at Trafford Park	
B5215	A572 at Leigh, Greater Manchester	A577 at Atherton, Greater Manchester	Formerly the A579 until the Atherleigh Way bypass opened. Originally ran from the B5213 in Stretford to the B5217 in Chorlton cum Hardy; the western end became part of a rerouted B5213 and the remainder upgraded to the A5145.
B5216 (defunct)	A5063 Trafford Road, Trafford	Trafford Park	Extended and upgraded to the A5081. The number also appears in the DfT Card Index from around 2002 as a route along Long Street in Wigston. There is no evidence (apart from a single unofficial online reference) that the number was used for this route; official documents in 1978 and 2013 state the route as a portion of the B5418. The same reference also states that Paddock Street was a portion of the B5216, but this was a cul-de-sac before 1978 and is also odd that the number would have changed between 1978 and 2013.
B5217	A5014 Talbot Road in Trafford Bar	A5145 in Chorlton cum Hardy	Originally continued to the then-A34 (now B5093) in Didsbury; this is now part of the A5145.
B5218	B5217 in Old Trafford	A5067 in Hulme	Extended north to the A56 Chester Road at St George's in the 1960s, but this was quickly renumbered to the A5067.
B5219	B5117 Oxford Road in Moss Side	B5218 in Old Trafford	
B5220 (defunct)	A526 (now B5117) in Rusholme	A57 in Gorton	Section west of the A6 (along Dickenson Road) upgraded to the A6010 and the remainder declassified.
B5221 (defunct)	A6 in Longsight	B5220 in Salford	Originally ended at the A6 in Salford, but was extended to the B5220 in 1935. In the 1960s, the section north of Plymouth Grove became a portion of a rerouted A34 and the remainder was upgraded to the A5184.
B5222 (defunct)	Albert Square, Manchester	A6 Market Street, Manchester	Upgraded to an extension of the A6042 (although this was out-of-zone), but is now unclassified due to restructuring following the 1996 IRA bombing.
B5222 (defunct)	A577 Wigan Road, Lancashire	A58 Market Street, Lancashire	Existed by the 1950s; now a spur of the A577.
B5223 (defunct)	B5219 in Moss Side	A5067 in Old Trafford	Declassified; the section west of the B5218 is still a public road (but partially pedestrianized) while the western section is gone due to redevelopment.
B5224	A5014 Chester Road in Old Trafford	B5217 Seymour Grove in Old Trafford	
B5225	A34 Quay Street in Manchester	B5461 Ordsall Lane in Salford	Section along the Princes Bridge split by the A6042 and the section along Hope Street split by the Windsor Link in the 1980s (although this had been declassified some years earlier).
B5226 (defunct)	A5063 Trafford Road, Salford	A5065 New Park Road, Salford	Declassified; the section along Taylorson Street is still a public road (although sections have been pedestrianized), the New Park Road section is now mainly a pathway through Ordsall Park and the section along Marketdale Street is completely gone.
B5227 (defunct)	A57 in Weaste, Salford	A6 at Brindle Heath, Salford	Upgraded to Class I status as the A5186 sometime after the 1970s.
B5228	A6/A580/A666 at Pendlebury	A57 Eccles New Road at Weaste	
B5229	A576 in Eccles	B5211 in Winton	
B5230	B5211 in Barton upon Irwell	B5229 in Eccles	Originally continued west and north to the A57 in Peel Green; this was declassified in the 1960s.
B5231	A666 at Pendlebury	A57 at Patricroft	
B5232	A577 at Mosley Common	A575 and A6 in Walkden	
B5233	B5261 near St. Annes, Lancashire	St. Annes, Lancashire	Originally ran from the A577 in Tyldesley to the A572 in Astley; this was upgraded to Class I status as the A5082 in the mid-1920s.
B5234	B5014 in Abbots Bromley	B5017 in Needwood	Originally ran from the A577 east of Tyldesley to the A666 near Farnsworth; this was upgraded to Class I status as the A5082.
B5235	B5215 at Howe Bridge, Atherton, Greater Manchester	A6 at Wingates, Westhoughton, Greater Manchester	Intersects the A579, A577 and A58.
B5236	A58 at Westhoughton	A6 at Wingates	
B5237	A573 at Abram	A578 at Westleigh	
B5238	A49 south of Wigan	A673 at Horwich	
B5239	A6, near M61 J6	A49 at Standish	
B5240	A570 (near M58 J3) west of Skelmersdale, Lancashire	A5209 east of Burscough, Lancashire	
B5241	A59 at Burscough, Lancashire	A5209 at Burscough, Lancashire	Only about ½ mile long
B5242	A59 near Burscough, Lancashire	A570 at Scarisbrick, Lancashire	
B5243	A570 at Scarisbrick, Lancashire	B5208 at Birkdale, Merseyside	
B5244	A5267 at Churchtown, Merseyside	A565 at Crossens, Merseyside	
B5245	A565 in Southport, Merseyside	A5267 in Southport, Merseyside	Incorporates most of Southport Promenade
B5246	A565 at Mere Brow, Lancashire	A5209 at Parbold, Lancashire	By way of Rufford, where it crosses A59
B5247	A581 at Croston, Lancashire	A59 near Bretherton, Lancashire	
B5248	B5247 at Bretherton, Lancashire	A6 at Whittle-le-Woods, Lancashire	
B5249	B5247 in Croston, Lancashire	A581, 1 mile east of Croston	
B5250	A5209 (M6 J27), Shevington Moor, Greater Manchester	A581 near Newtown, Lancashire	
B5251	Chorley, Lancashire	A49 near Coppull, Lancashire	
B5252	A6 in Chorley, Lancashire	Euxton, Lancashire	
B5253	A581 near Ulnes Walton, Lancashire	A582 near Farington, Lancashire	
B5254	A582 at Penwortham, Lancashire	Leyland, Lancashire	
B5255 (defunct)	B5254 in Leyland, Lancashire	A49 near Clayton-le-Woods, Lancashire	Spilt in two by the M6 in the 1960s and was probably declassified around that time.
B5255 (defunct)			Number planned to be given to a former section of the A572 along Lord Street in Leigh, but this never happened and the road became a spur of the B5215 (former A579) instead.
B5256	A675 at Hoghton, Lancashire	Leyland, Lancashire	
B5257	B5254 at Lostock Hall, Lancashire	B6258 at Bamber Bridge, Lancashire	
B5258	A587 Fleetwood Road, Anchorsholme	Bispham Road, Norcross	Built in the 1970s, but the number did not appear on maps until 2011. Originally ran along Corporation Street in Preston; became a portion of a rerouted A59. After the A59 was rerouted, the section north of Ringway became a portion of the A5071 and the southern portion downgraded to the C329.
B5259	Lytham, Lancashire	Kirkham, Lancashire	
B5260	Kirkham, Lancashire	Singleton, Lancashire	
B5261	A5099 Central Drive in Blackpool	Fairlawn Road/A584 in Lytham	
B5262	A584 at Manchester Square, Blackpool	A5230 across from Blackpool Airport	Section along Blackpool Promenade became part of a rerouted A584 in the late 1920s (the B5262 was rerouted over the former A584 along Lytham Road) and the section along Squires Gate Lane became part of the A5230 in the 1990s.
B5263	A583 Whitegate Drive in Blackpool	A5099 Central Drive in Blackpool	
B5264	Plumpton Lane, Woodplumpton	Woodplumpton	Formerly the C346 before 2009. First used along the southernmost section of Devonshire Road in Blackpool. Became a portion of a rerouted A587 by 1932 (old A587 became an unnumbered Class II road, although the two routes may have swapped numbers in the 1920s). After the A587 returned to its original routing to form a portion of the Blackpool eastern bypass, this became a portion of the B5124. Next used along Bispham Road in Blackpool from the A587 to the A586, along the old route of the A587 (which was rerouted over the original B5264). Returned to the A587 after it was routed back to its original route; the old route of the A587 (the original B5264) is now the B5124. The OS maps show the last bit along Benson Road and the final part along Bispham Road as part of the B5264, despite it not showing on any other maps nor signed on the ground.
B5265	Blackpool Promenade, Lancashire	Layton, Blackpool, Lancashire	
B5266	Blackpool, Lancashire	Singleton, Lancashire	
B5267	Poulton-le-Fylde, Lancashire	Poulton-le-Fylde, Lancashire	
B5268	Little Carleton, Lancashire	A585 near Fleetwood, Lancashire	
B5269	Thistleton, Lancashire	Longridge, Lancashire	
B5270	A588 near Preesall, Lancashire	Knott End-on-Sea, Lancashire	
B5271	A590 at Lindale, Cumbria	B5277 east of Grange-over-Sands, Cumbria	Originally ran between the A586 and the A6 in Catterall. Became a portion of a rerouted A6 in the early 1930s after it was diverted to follow the new western bypass of Garstang.
B5272	A6 near Scorton, Lancashire	A588 at Cockerham, Lancashire	
B5273	A589 Heysham Road at Heysham	A589 at Scale Hall	Originally continued east to Lancaster to what is now the A589; most of this became part of a rerouted A589 in the late 1920s.
B5274	B5321 Euston Road in Morecambe	A589 in Morecambe	Unsigned.
B5275	Bare, Lancashire	Torrisholme, Lancashire	
B5276	A570 at Kew, Southport	A5267 near Southport, Merseyside	Originally ran from the A589 (later B5321) at Torrisholme to the A6 at Slyne; declassified by the mid-1940s.
B5277	Meathop (junction with A590 [Meathop Roundabout])	Flookburgh (becomes B5278)	
B5278	Flookburgh (becomes B5277)	Haverthwaite (junction with A590)	
B5279	A470 at Tal-y-Cafn, Gwynedd	B5106 at Tyn-y-Groes, Gwynedd	Crosses the River Conwy at Tal-y-Cafn bridge, the only crossing between Conwy and Llanrwst. Originally ran from the A590 in Greenodd to the A593 in Torver. Upgraded to Class I status as the A5084 in the mid-1920s; the southern section is now part of the A5092.
B5280	B5245, Southport	A565 at Hesketh Park, Southport	Originally ran from the B5279 (now A5084) in Lowick Green to the B5281 in Gawthwaite. Upgraded to Class I status as the A5092 after World War II as part of a plan to allow traffic to access Broughton-in-Furness and points west by A-road without having to detour via Dalton.
B5281	A590, Ulverston (Tank Square roundabout / Brewery Street)	A5092, Gawthwaite	The route is split in Ulverston with two separate roads designated 'B5281'. This is due to Ulverston's one-way system.
B5282	A6 at Milnthorpe	Arnside	Originally ran from the A590 in Barrow-in-Furness to Roose. Upgraded to Class I status as a portion of the A5087 by 1932; the section along Rawlinson Street is now unclassified.
B5283 (defunct)	A595 in Hallthwaites	A595 in Whicham	Became a portion of a rerouted A595 after World War II (the old route of the A595 is now the A5093).
B5284	A5074 on the eastern shore of Windermere	Roundabout with the A591 and A5284 roads west of Kendal	
B5285	Coniston	A5074 on the eastern shore of Windermere	The road crosses Windermere on the Windermere Ferry
B5286	B5285 near Hawkshead	A593 near Ambleside	
B5287	Dove Cottage roundabout with A591, east of Grasmere	A591 north east of Grasmere	Offshoot of the A591 running through Grasmere
B5288	A592 in Penrith	A66 in Beckces	Former portion of the A594. First used from the A592 at Glencoyne Park to the A594 (now A66) in Troutbeck. Upgraded to Class I status as the A5091 in the mid-1920s. Next used from the then-B5320 just outside Stainton to the then-A594 at Penruddock, paralleling the current route. Became a portion of the A66 in 1968 after the M6 Penrith bypass opened.
B5289	B5291 in Low Lorton	A66 near Keswick	Major traffic artery within Lake District, connecting Derwent Water, Borrowdale, Buttermere and Crummock Water. Reaches 356 m (1,167 ft) at Honister Pass
B5290	A588 at Conder Green	Glasson Dock	First used on a route between Keswick and Bothel. Upgraded early on (1927–1928) to an extension of the A591; the southern end (within the Keswick bypass) is now part of the A5271 and the rest remains the A591. May also have been used along what is now the A5103 Princess Parkway/Princess Road in Manchester, as the 1932 and 1933 OS Ten Mile road maps show the number running through southern Manchester to the A560 on the southwest side of Northenden (now in Wythenshawe). The route is shown as the B529 (a typo) on a 1934 map. The 1934 OS Ten Mile map shows the route as upgraded to the A5103 and the B5290 along its current route near Lancaster.
B5292	A66 at Braithwaite near Keswick	Cockermouth	Route goes over Whinlatter Pass
B5293	A586 at Leckonby Hall, Great Eccleston	A586 in Great Eccleston	Former routing of the A586. First used from the B5292 in Cockermouth to the A595 near Egremont. Due to its importance, it was upgraded early on to Class I status as the A5086 in the mid-1920s. Next used from the B5992 in Low Lorton to Buttermere. Became an extension of the B5289 in 1935.
B5294	B5295 at Whinney Hill	A5086 at Fritzington	
B5295	A595 at Hensingham	A5086 at Cleator Moor	
B5296	A596 in Workington	A597 at Mossbay	Originally continued south to the A595 at Distington; this became part of an extended A597 in 1988.
B5297	A596 in Workington	A597 in Workington	
B5298 (defunct)	A597 in Workington	A596 in North Side	Crossed the River Derwent. Became a portion of the A597 in 1988 after the Workington bypass was built.
B5299	A596 at Aspatria, Cumbria	Carlisle	via Mealsgate (A595), Caldbeck and Dalston Originally ran from the A595 in Papcastle to the A596 near Maryport. Renumbered as an extension of the A594 in the 1920s.

== B5300 to B5399 ==
Road	From	To	Notes
B5300	A596 north of Maryport	Silloth-on-Solway	By way of Beckfoot, Mawbray, and Allonby
B5301	B5300 at Silloth	A595 between Cockermouth and Bothel	By way of Tarns, Westnewton, and Aspatria
B5302	B5300 at Silloth	A596 at Wigton	By way of Causewayhead, Abbeytown, and Waverbridge.
B5303 (defunct)	B5302 at Waverbridge	Wigton railway station	Part of the route (from Waverbridge to Station Hill in Wigton) still exists, but the road is defunct following construction of the A596 Wigton bypass in the early 1990s.
B5304	B5305 at Wigton	A595 at Red Dial	Just over one mile in length.
B5305	B5302 at Wigton	A6 at Plumpton Head	
B5306	A595 and A597 in Lillyhall	A595 in Parton	Former routing of the A595. Originally ran along Brunswick Road in Penrith; renumbered as a portion of the A592 in 1968 after the M6 Penrith bypass was built.
B5307	B5302 at Abbeytown	A595 at Carlisle	
B5308	A54 at Chester Road, Holmes Chapel	A50 at The Square, Holmes Chapel	
B5309	A54 at East Middlewich	A530 at North Middlewich	
B5310 (defunct)			First used along Victoria Road in Runcorn; the route was declassified after the A533 split the route in two. The eastern end is now the B5155. Also appeared in the DfT Roads List as a route along Woolston Grange Avenue between the A57 and A574 east of Warrington, but this is a typo for the B5210.
B5311	B5320 at Liverpool Road	A57 at Cadishead Way	Originally used as a bypass of Sale, connecting the B5166 to itself. Became an extension of the A6144 around 1970.
B5312	A577 east of Skelmersdale	A570 east of Skelmersdale	Former routing of the A577. A branch was later built to link to the current A577. First used in 1924 along Finkle Street and Corporation Road in Carlisle. Upgraded to a spur of the A595 in the 1940s, although a portion has been bypassed. Next used as an inner relief road into Lichfeld; one portion was upgraded to the A5127 and the remainder declassified.
B5313 (defunct)	Tamworth railway station	A51 and A5003 in Tamworth	Declassified.
B5314	A5 at Weston-under-Lizard	A41 at Weston Heath	
B5315	A520 at Granville Square, Stone	Stone railway station	Unsigned; some maps claim the road to be an orphaned section of the B5027.
B5316 (defunct)	B5406 in Telford	A5 in Telford	Declassified by 1986.
B5317 (defunct)	Chester Road, Manchester	Water Street, Manchester	Maps showed the route as a B-road, but with no number. Became a portion of the A57 in the late 1960s, probably when the A57(M) diverted it through the city center.
B5317 (defunct)			Reserved on 25 January 2007 for Sheil Road in Liverpool. The road has been the B5188 since classification and there is no obvious reason why the number needs to change.
B5318	A5058 in Bootle	A5056 in Bootle	Brasenose Road
B5319	A59 at Ormskirk	A59 at Ormskirk	Bypassed former route of A59 through central Ormskirk
B5320	A592 in Waterfoot	A6 at Eamont Bridge	Original 1924 route ran from the A592 in Waterfoot to the then-A594 (now B5288) in Penrith, but much of the route became part of the A592 (the section through Redhills was downgraded to a minor road as it was bypassed by the A66) in 1969 when the M6 Penrith bypass opened. The B5320 was reassigned to a former routing of the A592.
B5320	A57 in Irlam	B5471 in Cadishead	Former routing of the A57 through Irlam. Some signs state that the B5320 continues past the B5471 under a former rail line back to the A57 at the southern end of the bypass, but maps disagree on this.
B5321	Lancaster	Morecambe	
B5322	A591 at Legburthwaite	A66 at Threlkeld	
B5323	A4300 in Kettering	A6013 in Kettering	
B5324	A6 at Hathern, Leicestershire	A512 near Coleorton, Leicestershire	Originally continued east to the B676 near Old Dalby; this section became part of the A6006 in the 1960s.
B5325 (defunct)	A447 south of Stapleton	A5096 in Barwell	Declassified (along with the A5096) in 2009 after the A47 Hinckley northern bypass opened. Signs still mention the B5325.
B5326 (defunct)	B591 in Heather	A453 in Ashby de la Zouch	Declassified.
B5327	Leicester	A563 Leicester Ring Road near Beaumont Leys	Formerly continued to A50 at Markfield, this section mainly un-numbered classified though part now A5630
B5328 (defunct)	B675 in Barrow upon Soar	B5327 in Anstey	Declassified in the 2000s.
B5329 (defunct)	B587 in Whitwick	A50 in Coalville	Declassified around 2000.
B5330 (defunct)	B5328 in Cropston	B588 in Shepshed	Declassified around 2000; one short section south of the A512 is now part of the B591.
B5331	A523 in Poolend	Rudyard	
B5332 (defunct)	A525 and A547 in Rhuddlan	A55 in Pant y Wacco	Much of route now the A5151; section east of Penfforddllan is now part of the A5026.
B5333 (defunct)	A5027/A5028 in Wallasey	B5142 in Wallasey	One section now part of the A5027.
B5334	A51 in Nantwich	B5074 in Nantwich	Former A530. Originally ran along Park Street and Kinsey Street in Congleton, now unclassified and split up by the A54 relief road.
B5335 (defunct)	A54 in Middlewich	B5309 near Middlewich	Became a portion of the A530 between 1946 and 1956.
B5336 (defunct)	A5018 in Wharton Green	A533 near Mere Heath	Declassified in the late 1990s; the northern end no longer connected to a classified road (the A533 was rerouted) and the southern end was cut off by the rerouted A533.
B5337 (defunct)	Northwich inner ring road		Most maps show the route as the A5509.
B5338	B5074 in Nantwich	A51 Nantwich bypass	Former portion of the A534.
B5339	Liverpool City Centre	Liverpool City Centre	Ranelagh Street and Hanover Street
B5340 (defunct)	B5178 in Liverpool	A580 in Liverpool	The section along Towerlands Street later became part of the A5047 one-way system and Low Hill became part of the A580. The remainder was declassified after the A5047 was dualled and the A580 was extended.
B5341	A51 and A534 in Burford	A530 in Nantwich	The western end was originally the A51 (later A534) and the section south of the rail line was the A464 (later A529, and A530 after that). Originally ran along New Park Road in Salford; was the A5065 before it was downgraded between 1960 and 1975. Now unclassified; some of the route is gone, part of the park or due to redevelopment.
B5342	A561 in Dingle	A562 at Sefton Park	Former portion of the A5089 (and B5175 and B5173 before that).
B5343	Skelwith Bridge	Middle Fell Farm, Great Langdale	
B5344	A595 near Gosforth	A595 east of Drigg	Serves the villages of Drigg and Seascale
B5345	A5094 in Whitehaven	A595 south of Thornhill	
B5346	A5123 Kettering Road in Abington, Northampton	A5095 Abington Grove in Abington, Northampton	Abington Avenue
B5347 (defunct)	A45 at Black Lion Hill, Northampton	A508 in Northampton	Upgraded to a portion of the A5080.
B5348	A6 Irthlingborough bypass	A6 at the Nene Park Roundabout	Former routing of the A6 through Irthlingborough.
B5349 (defunct)	A51 in Kettlebrook	A5 at Wilnecote	Blocked off by a rerouted A5; now unclassified.
B5350	A6 in Loughborough	A6004 in Loughborough	Formerly continued west to the B591 near Copt Oak; the western end became part of a rerouted B591 and the remainder declassified.
B5351 (defunct)	Former A6 in Mountsorrel, Leicestershire	Former B5328 in Rothley, Leicestershire	Declassified around 2000.
B5352	A53 in Newcastle	A525 in Newcastle	Seabridge Road, former routing of the A53.
B5353	B586 in Swadlincote	A444 in Stanton	May have been previously numbered as B5358.
B5354 (defunct)	Mill Street, Whitchurch	Newport Road, Whitchurch	Renumbered to the B5364 after World War II, to the B5467 in 1990, and is now an extension of the B5398.
B5355	A5018 at Winsford, Cheshire	A54 at Winsford railway station	
B5356	A56 Daresbury bypass near Daresbury	A50 in Lymm	
B5357	B5162	Hale railway station	
B5358	A5102 near Wilmslow, Cheshire	A34 north of Heald Green, Stockport	The route of the A34 prior to mid-1990s Wilmslow / Handforth bypass Originally ran west of Swadlincote from the B586 to the A511 (now A444) in Stanton. Both B5358s are shown on a 1932 map; this could be a map error, or both routes actually coexisted for some time. Whatever the result, this B5358 is now the B5353.
B5359	A34 in Wilmslow	A537 in Chelmsford	Former A535 and A34, created in November 2010 after the A34 Alderley Edge Bypass was completed. Originally a short loop off the A594 in Keswick. The sections along Victoria Street and Bank Street are now part of the A5271 (they were the A594 before this).
B5360	A592 south of Storrs	A5074 in Blackwell	Former portion of the A592.
B5361 (defunct)	Watford Way, Mill Hill	The Ridgeway, Mill Hill	Renumbered to B1461 in the 1950s after the A1 was rerouted (which would have put the B5361 out-of-zone).
B5361 (defunct)	A41 in Birkenhead	A41 in Birkenhead	Downgraded in 1969 after the Queensway Tunnel approaches were rebuilt.
B5362 (defunct)	B552 near Holders Hill Circus	A500 (now A598) in Hinckley	Renumbered to B1462 in the 1950s after the A1 was rerouted (which would have put the B5362 out-of-zone).
B5363 (defunct)	A427 (now A4303) in Market Harborough	A6 in Market Harborough	Eastern end now part of the A508 and remainder unclassified.
B5364 (defunct)	B581 in Elmesthorpe	A47 in Earl Shilton	Declassified in 2009 after the A47 bypass was built.
B5364 (defunct)	A41 and A525 in Chemistry	B5398 in Whitchurch	Former section of the A525; renumbered as an extension of the B5398.
B5365 (defunct)	B582 in Enderby	A46 (now B4114) in Grove Park	Declassified after 1975.
B5366	A426, Raw Dykes, Leicester	B582 St. Thomas Road, Wigston, Leicestershire	Main subsidiary route into Leicester City Center. Also crosses A563, used as a diversionary route when the A426 is disrupted.
B5367	A34/A52 in Newcastle-under-Lyme	B5500 in Shraleybrook	
B5368	B5044 in Silverdale	B5370 in Wolstanton	Former portion of the A527.
B5369	A53 in Basford	B5500 in Chesterton	
B5370	A527 in Wolstanton	A500/A5271 in Longport	Includes a branch to the B5369.
B5371	A50 at Kidsgrove, Cheshire	A34 at Butt Lane near Kidsgrove	
B5372 (defunct)	B5105 Mwrog Street, Ruthin	A494 Corwen Road, Ruthin	Now a portion of a rerouted A494.
B5373	B5445 in Gresford	A550 in Hope	
B5374	A559 Chester Road in Greenbank	A533 Winnington Lane in Winnington	
B5375	A5209 near Appley Bridge	B5376 at Wigan	
B5376	A49 at Wigan	A49 north of Wigan	
B5377	A588 in Preesall Park	B5270 in Knott End-on-Sea	
B5378	A5183 in Elstree	A414 in London Colney	
B5379 (defunct)	Market Place, Bedford	St Loves Street, Bedford	Section past St Pauls Church is now part of the A600 loop.
B5380	A46 in Glenfield	A47 at Braunstone Crossroads	The original route was from the B582 in Desford via Kirby Muxloe to the A47 near Leicester Forest East. This is now unclassified, although it is shown on maps following completion of the M1 and well into the 1970s. What happened next is uncertain: either the B5380 number was moved onto the current route (with or without a gap in between), or it was rerouted east away from Kirby Muxloe onto its present route for reasons unknown, and then later cut back, probably due to completion of the A46 bypass.
B5381	A55/A470/A547 at Llandudno Junction	A525 in Trefnant	by way of Betws-yn-Rhos and St Asaph, Llanelwy Originally the first section of Derby's outer ring road, between the A516 and A514. Extended and renumbered in the late 1930s to the A5111.
B5382	A548 at Llangernyw	A543 at Denbigh	by way of Llansannan; former routing of the A543.
B5383	B5381 at Dolwen, Denbighshire	A547 at Old Colwyn	passes Colwyn Bay Football Club football ground Originally ran from St Asaph to Trefnant. Renumbered to a portion of the B5381 in 1935, then a portion of a rerouted A525 between the 1940s and 1970s, and is now back to the B5381.
B5384	A548 near Pandy Tudur	B5382 near Llansannan	Originally ran from Bylchau to Llanfair Talhaiarn. Upgraded to Class I status as the A544 in 1935.
B5385	A428 west of East Haddon	A5 at Watford Gap	Section in Watford formerly part of the B4036.
B5386	A49 Little Lane, Wigan	A571 Victoria Street, Wigan	Designated in 2020 along the former A49, which was rerouted. Originally ran along Westfield Road in Wellingsborough; formerly the B573. Now declassified.
B5387 (defunct)	A43 (now A6013) Northampton Road in Kettering	A6003 Rockingham Road in Barton Seagrave	Became a portion of a rerouted A6003.
B5388	A509 at Olney	A428 at Yardley Hastings	
B5389 (defunct)	A426 and A50 in Leicester	A6 in Leicester	Likely designated after the A6 was rerouted east (as it has a Zone 5 number), not shown as a B road on most maps as it was so short; now unclassified.
B5390	Blackpool, Lancashire	Blackpool, Lancashire	
B5391	A559 near Northwich, Cheshire	M6 J19	
B5392	Macclesfield, Cheshire	Jodrell Bank, Cheshire	
B5393	A56 near Frodsham, Cheshire	A54 near Tarvin, Cheshire	
B5394	A56 at Frodsham, Cheshire	B5152 at Frodsham, Cheshire	Fluin Lane, Frodsham
B5395	Malpas	Whitchurch	
B5396 (defunct)	A453 in Willesey	A50 near Ashby de la Zouch	Declassified in the 1980s after the A42 was built along a similar route.
B5397	A56 Cross Street in Sale	B5166 Northenden Road in Sale	Exists in two sections, connected by a multiplex with the A6144.
B5398	A525 Whitchurch bypass west of Broughall	A41/A525 in Chemistry	Former routing of the A525 through Whitchurch.
B5399 (defunct)	Silver Street, Tamworth	Gungate, Tamworth	Declassified due to town center improvement works; now partly pedestrianized.

== B5400 to B5499 ==
Road	From	To	Notes
B5400 (defunct)	A6 in Kegworth	A453 near Isley Walton	Rerouted to the south in 1970-1971 due to runway extension at East Midlands Airport (the road originally crossed the present runway), after which it was upgraded to the A5129 (now A453) shortly afterwards.
B5401 (defunct)	B5324 near Long Whatton, Leicestershire	A453 near Diseworth, Leicestershire	Section north of the B5400 split by East Midlands Airport and declassified; the remainder was declassified after the 1990s.
B5402 (defunct)	A5070 (now B4669) in Hinckley	A47 (now B4666)	Eastern half renumbered to B590 after the 1980s (possibly earlier) and the remainder declassified.
B5403	A6 in Oadby	B582 in Oadby	Former routing of the A6 through Oadby. Originally continued along Leicester Road back to the A6; this section is now unclassified.
B5404	A5 Watling Street at Wilnecote, Staffordshire (just off M42 J10)	A51 at Hopwas, Staffordshire	Includes part of the original A5 Watling Street, now bypassed through Tamworth
B5405	A519 at Woodseaves, Staffordshire	A5013 at Great Bridgeford, Staffordshire	
B5406 (defunct)	St. Georges, Telford	Oakengates, Telford	Ran along Watling Street; originally the A5 (and B5060 after that); now unclassified and partly pedestrianized.
B5407	A5147 in Lydiate, Merseyside	A59 at Aughton Chase, nr. Lydiate	
B5408	A6 in Blackrod, Manchester Road, Bolton	A6 Blackrod, Chorley Road, Bolton	
B5409	Rossall, Lancashire	A585 near Fleetwood, Lancashire	
B5410	B5261 in Henhouses	A563 at Peel Hill	Originally ran along Talbot Lane in Stretford. By 1946 it was the B6410 (an out-of-zone number as the route was west of the A6), but has since been upgraded to a portion of the A5014.
B5411	Preston, Lancashire	B5269 near Woodplumpton, Lancashire	
B5412	Cleveleys, Lancashire	Thornton, Lancashire	
B5413	Rainhill, Merseyside	A58 west of St Helens	
B5414	A426 in north-central Rugby, Warwickshire; A4304 in North Kilworth, Leicestershire	A428 in east-central Rugby, Warwickshire; A5199 north of Husbands Bosworth, Leicestershire	Road now in two sections separated by un-numbered classified roads
B5415	A53 in Red Bull	B5026 in Winnington	
B5416	A5121 in Burton upon Trent	B5018 in Burton upon Trent	Section along Wellington Street and Derby Street is now part of the A5121.
B5417	A522 in Cheadle	A52 near Cauldon	Unclassified road until the 1940s.
B5418	A563 and B5366 in Aylestone	A5199 and B582 in Wigston Magna	Formerly routed from east of Kirby Muxloe to the A46 (now A5460). Extended to and then over the B5419 by the 1970s; the western end was cut back piece by piece to the B5366. The western end (declassified in the 1960s) is now a part of the B5380 after the A46 bypass was built.
B5419	Widnes, Cheshire	A569 at Lea Green railway station, St Helens	Formerly the A568. Originally ran from the B5366 in Aylestone to the A50 (now A5199) in Wigston Magna; this is now part of an extended B5418.
B5420	Menai Bridge	Llangefni	by way of Penmynydd
B5421	Waterloo, Merseyside	Seaforth, Merseyside	
B5422	Maghull, Merseyside	Litherland, Merseyside	Bifurcates in Maghull
B5423	Mersey Square in Stockport	Bridgefield Street in Stockport	Prince's Street; the section from Heaton Norris to Stockport is now part of the A5145.
B5424	A565 north of Formby	A565 south of Formby	Former routing of the A565 through Formby.
B5425	B5102 in Llay	A5102 in Rhosddu, Wrexham	
B5426	B5605 at Pentre Bychan, Wrexham County Borough	A525 at Coedpoeth, Wrexham County Borough	
B5427	A470 at Llanrwst, Conwy County Borough	B5113 south east of Llanrwst, north west of Nebo	
B5428	Junction with A525 and A541 at Trefnant, Denbighshire	Junction with A543 at Groes, Conwy County Borough	via Henllan
B5429	A5151 at Rhuddlan	A494 at Pandy'r Capel	Portion of route former A55.
B5430	A525 north west of Coedpoeth	A494 south of Llanferres	
B5431	A525 at Nant-y-Garth Pass	B5430 in Llanarmon-yn-Iâl	
B5432	A5026 in Holywell	A5026 in Holywell	Halkyn Street, with a branch along Cross Roads; unsigned. May have previously been an extension of the B5121.
B5433	B5101 in Brymbo	B5101 in Caego	
B5434	A5 at Froncysyllte	A539 at Trevor	
B5435	A534 east of Bylchau	B4501 in Groesffordd Nant-y-cî	
B5436	B5437 in Carrog	A5104 in Fron-newydd	
B5437	A5104 in Clawdd Poncen	A5 in Llidiart-y-Parc	
B5438 (defunct)	Heath Road, Runcorn	Halton Avenue, Runcorn	Ran along Boston Avenue; upgraded to a portion of the A558 in the 1960s and is now unclassified.
B5439	B5412 in Thornton	B5268 in Trunnah	
B5440	B5404 in Wilnecote	B5000 in Glascote Heath	
B5441	B5129 in Queensferry	A548/A550 at Deeside Industrial Park	Former routing of the A548 and A550.
~~B5442~~	unused		
B5443 (defunct)	Llanddulas	Abergele	Originally a portion of the A55 before it was rerouted onto the Abergele bypass in 1968. Upgraded to an extension of the A547 in 1985 after the A55 Colwyn Bay bypass opened.
B5444	A4217 near Pentrechwyth	A4217 in Winch Wen	Out-of-zone and a duplicate number; area served by B5444 is bypassed by the A4217
B5444	A541 near Mold	A541 near Llong	Former routing of the A541.
B5445	A483 in Gresford	A483 in Belgrave	Former routing of the A483.
B5446	Bridge Street in Wrexham	Salop Street in Wrexham	Forms part of the Wrexham inner ring road, the rest being the A5152. Possibly created when the high street which had been part of the A5152 was declassified.
~~B5447~~ - ~~B5459~~	unused		
B5460	B5012 near Penkridge, Staffordshire	A460 near Rugeley Town Centre	Unsigned.
B5461	A5066 in Salford	A34 in Salford	Former section of the A5064.
~~B5462~~	unused		
B5463	A550 near Ledsham, Cheshire	A5032 junction with the M53 motorway in Ellesmere Port	in two sections broken up by the A41.
~~B5464~~	unused		
B5465	A560 in Cheadle Heath	A626 in Stockport	Originally routed along Shaw Heath and St Mary's Way until 2019; this is now the B6184 and A6188, respectively. The B5465 now follows Greek Street, Edward Street and Waterloo Road to the A626.
B5466 (defunct)	B5320 in Irlam	A57 in Irlam	Formerly a portion of the A57 Irlam bypass; now unclassified.
B5467	A582 Edith Rigby Way	B6241 north of Tanterton	
B5468	A582 Edith Rigby Way	B6241 south of Cottam	
~~B5469~~	unused		
B5470	Chapel-en-le-Frith	Macclesfield	by way of Whaley Bridge
B5471	B5320 in Cadishead	A57 in Cadishead	
B5472	A5020 near Crewe Hall	A500 and A531 at Meremoor Moss	Designated December 2015; former section of the A5020.
~~B5473~~ - ~~B5475~~	unused		
B5476	A528 in Harmer Hill	A49 in Whitchurch	Former A5113 (and A49 before that).
B5477	A551 in Wallasey, Merseyside	A554 in Wallasey, Merseyside	Former portion of the A551.
B5477	A49 at Little Stretton, Shropshire	A49 northeast of All Stretton, Shropshire	Was until 2004 the northern section of the B4370; it is anomalously numbered
~~B5478~~ - ~~B5489~~	unused		
B5490	A50 at Sideway	A5035 in Hem Heath	
~~B5491~~ - ~~B5492~~	unused		
B5493	A453 east of Tamworth	M42 J11 and A444 at Appleby Magna	Former A453. Originally continued to Measham, but this section was declassified around 2000. The DfT Road Index from around 2002 states that the route continues to Castle Donington.
~~B5494~~ - ~~B5499~~	unused		

== B5500 to B5999 ==
Road	From	To	Notes
B5500	A34 at Newcastle-under-Lyme	A531 at Balterley Heath	Former A52 now bypassed by the A500
B5569	Over Tabley	Millington	Allocated for the former A556 that was diverted onto a new dual carriageway between the M6 and M56
B5605	A5 near Pentre	A483 J3 at Rhostyllen	
B5704	A5 at Hockliffe, Bedfordshire	A507 at Ridgmont	Downgraded part of the A4012
B5790	A5505, Houghton Regis	B579, Houghton Regis	About 600 metres long
B5999 (defunct)	A500 in Porthill	A50 in Tunstall	Former routing of the A527. Maps show the route as part of the A5271, but this is rarely signed on the ground. The original renumbering, according to some maps, was B5999, but it is unclear if this number was actually used or if it was more of a copyright trap or a placeholder.
