= Ivonbrook Grange =

Civil parish in Derbyshire, England

Coordinates: 53.123°N 1.639°W

- Civil parish
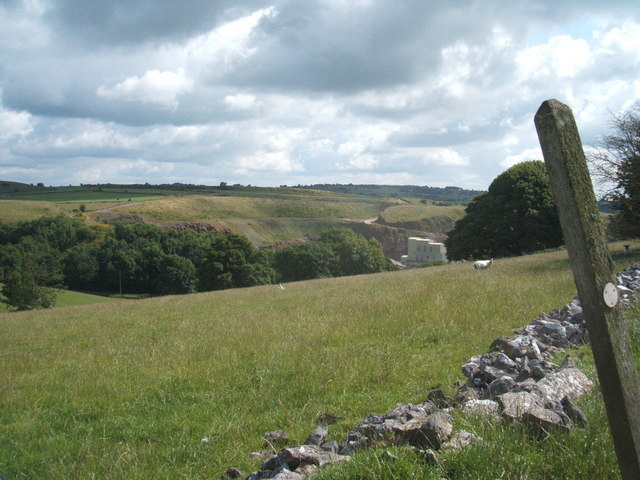
- Footpath post, fields and Ivonbrook Quarry

- Location within Derbyshire
- Interactive map of Ivonbrook Grange
- Area: 0.65 sq mi (1.7 km^{2}) (2021)
- Population: 14 (2021)
  - Density: 22/sq mi (8.5/km^{2})
- OS grid reference: SK 242585
  - London: 130 mi (210 km) SE
- District: Derbyshire Dales
- Shire county: Derbyshire
- Region: East Midlands
- Country: England
- Sovereign state: United Kingdom
- Settlements: Ivonbrook Grange; Grangemill
- Post town: MATLOCK
- Postcode district: DE4
- Dialling code: 01629
- Police: Derbyshire
- Fire: Derbyshire
- Ambulance: East Midlands
- UK Parliament: Derbyshire Dales

Ivonbrook Grange is a civil parish within the Derbyshire Dales district, in the county of Derbyshire, England. Largely rural, Ivonbrook Grange's population at the 2021 census was reported to be 14 people. It is 130 miles (210 km) north west of London, 15 miles (24 km) north west of the county city of Derby, and 3 1/2 miles (5.6 km) south west of the nearest market town of Matlock. Ivonbrook Grange is wholly within the Peak District national park on its southern edge, and shares a border with the parishes of Aldwark, Bonsall, Brassington, Ible as well as Winster. There is one listed structure in Ivonbrook Grange.

== Geography ==
=== Location ===
Ivonbrook Grange is surrounded by the following local areas:

- Winster to the north
- Ible and Brassington to the south
- Bonsall and Upper Town to the east
- Aldwark to the west.

The parish is roughly bounded by land features such as the disused Ivonbrook Quarry to the north, the quarry pond to the west, Tophill Farm in the east, while the A5012 Via Gellia road between Cromford and Newhaven, as well as the minor road to Ible lie to the south. This area lies in the centre of the Derbyshire Dales district and central west of Derbyshire county.

Ivonbrook Grange is completely within the Peak District National Park on its south eastern edge.

==== Settlements and routes ====
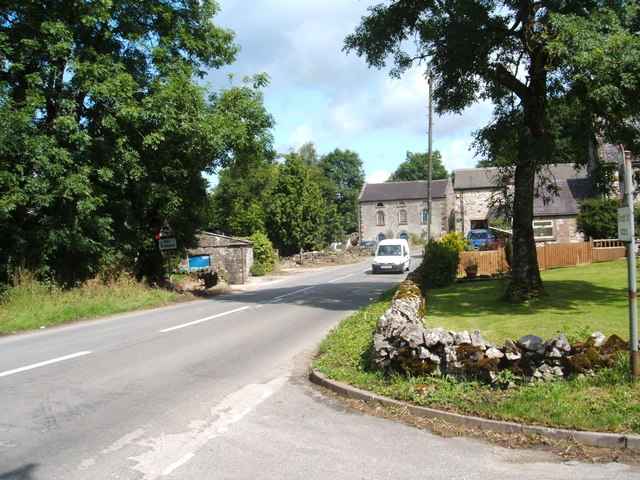
Grangemill, by the southern boundary of Ivonbrook Grange parish

There are two hamlets within the parish:

- Ivonbrook Grange is to the central north of the area along the B5056 road, comprising two farms;
- A cluster of residences and farms in the south at Grangemill along the B5056 road. However the immediate area around the Grangemill road junction is outside the boundary, mainly within Brassington parish, with a few residences on the fringes of Ible.

Outside of these settlements, Ivonbrook Grange parish is predominantly an agricultural and rural area, with Tophill Farm the only additional residence.

There are three roads throughout the parish, these however all meet outside Ivonbrook Grange at the Grangemill crossroads:

- A5012 Via Gellia route between Cromford and Newhaven which forms the south west edge of the area;
- B5056 which cuts through the middle of the parish north to south;
- Tophill Lane alongside Tophill Farm forms a brief portion of the south eastern parish boundary.

Stunstead Lane is an ancient track in the west of the parish.

The Limestone Way long-distance walking route skirts the south boundary by Grangemill.

=== Environment ===
==== Landscape and geology ====
Primarily farming and pasture land throughout the parish outside the sparsely populated areas, there is little forestry throughout, mainly around the fringes, the largest cluster alongside the quarry. The ground is a loamy soil with friable limestone.

==== Water features ====
There is one unnamed brook that begins south of Wigley Meadow Farm in the centre of the parish, and flows to Grangemill and through the Via Gellia valley to Cromford. The brook was once called Ivonbrook. A pond has formed from the mined out area of the quarry. A further small pond is formed from the Shothouse Spring in Grangemill, at the old mill location by Mill Farm.

==== Land elevation ====
The parish can be hilly to the east, but less steep in the west, the B5056 road nestled within a valley alongside the brook. The lowest points are around this valley from Grangemill to the Ivonbrook farms at ~240–250 metres (790–820 ft), the eastern area rises to ~310 metres (1,020 ft) near to Tophill Farm, with the parish peak in the western portion of the parish within the landscaped areas of the former Ivonbrook Quarry at 318 metres (1,043 ft).

== History ==
=== Toponymy ===
Ivonbrook Grange was recorded in the Domesday survey as Winbroc. It was named after the now-unnamed brook which rose in the middle of the parish and flowed south and east through the Via Gellia valley to Cromford. The grange portion was later added due to the medieval manorial ownership by a monastery. The place was known by and had many changes of name since, with Victorian era variations including Embrook, Ivenbrook and Ironbrook.

Grangemill was so named because it was the site of a mill owned by the monks from the monastery.

=== Local area ===
There is some evidence of a potential barrow feature, along with flint artefacts found throughout the parish, dating human occupation to between the early Mesolithic to late Bronze Ages (10000 BC to 701 BC). There is some existence of Roman routes through the parish, including the Derbyshire Portway along Stanstead Lane. At the time of Domesday in 1086 the wider area was held by Henry de Ferrers, Ivonbrook was reported as waste land with no residents, but was not said to be a manor. In the 12th century the land was granted to Buildwas Abbey in Shropshire by Henry Studley, or Henry de Ireton formerly de Eatington of the Shirley noble family from Derbyshire who were originally tenants of the Ferrers, and it became a monastic farm and grange, Buildwas being a Cistercian abbey. The Cistercians preferred grants of hassle-free and marginal land, with the Abbey clearing, draining and improving large tracts of lands and establishing sheep farms, the upland placement of Ivonbrook suggests it was almost certainly a sheep farm, with a number of historic sheepfolds recorded in the vicinity.

The mill in Grangemill was known as "the mill of the monks", and was mentioned in a charter dating from about 1247 of the deFerrers, the family later losing control of their manors around Wirksworth in 1269. After the Black Death and resulting impact on livelihoods and labour in the 14th century, many monasteries were forced to lease their granges to secular locals, until this point the Cistercians had little to no judicial or administrative involvement with the communities. Following the dissolution of the monasteries in the 1540s by Henry VIII, granges and their land were sold and given to favoured nobles. The manor was later granted by King Henry VIII to Edward Grey, eventually passing to Lord Powis, and through other landowners before ownership by Lord Scarsdale in the 19th century. Being former monastic land, the majority of Ivonbrook parish was exempt from tithes: the 1841 Tithe Map shows only two fields liable. The Rains were a notable late medieval farming family, residing in the area through to Victorian times. An infant school was recorded as being in Grangemill towards the end of the 19th century. The manor from Lord Scarsdale passed to a relation of the Scarsdale/Curzon family holding Lockington Hall, and individual plots sold off in 1918.

=== Industry ===
Limekilns locations have been recorded locally, suggesting limestone mining and processing taking place in the vicinity from medieval times, until the 19th century.

Lead mining activity took place in the far east of the parish in the 1540s.

Ivonbrook Quarry to the west was in operation since the 1940s, possibly reusing earlier mines. It produced a range of limestone aggregates, primarily for use in the manufacture of concrete products and asphalt, eventually expanding to two sites taking up much of this portion of the parish. Since the 2010s they have ceased mining and the area is being landscaped.

In Grangemill, as well as the medieval mill owned by Buildwas Abbey, there was a water powered 18th century corn mill at Mill Farm fed by Shothouse Spring to the north of the parish, the pond later being used as a trout farm.

== Governance and demography ==
=== Population ===
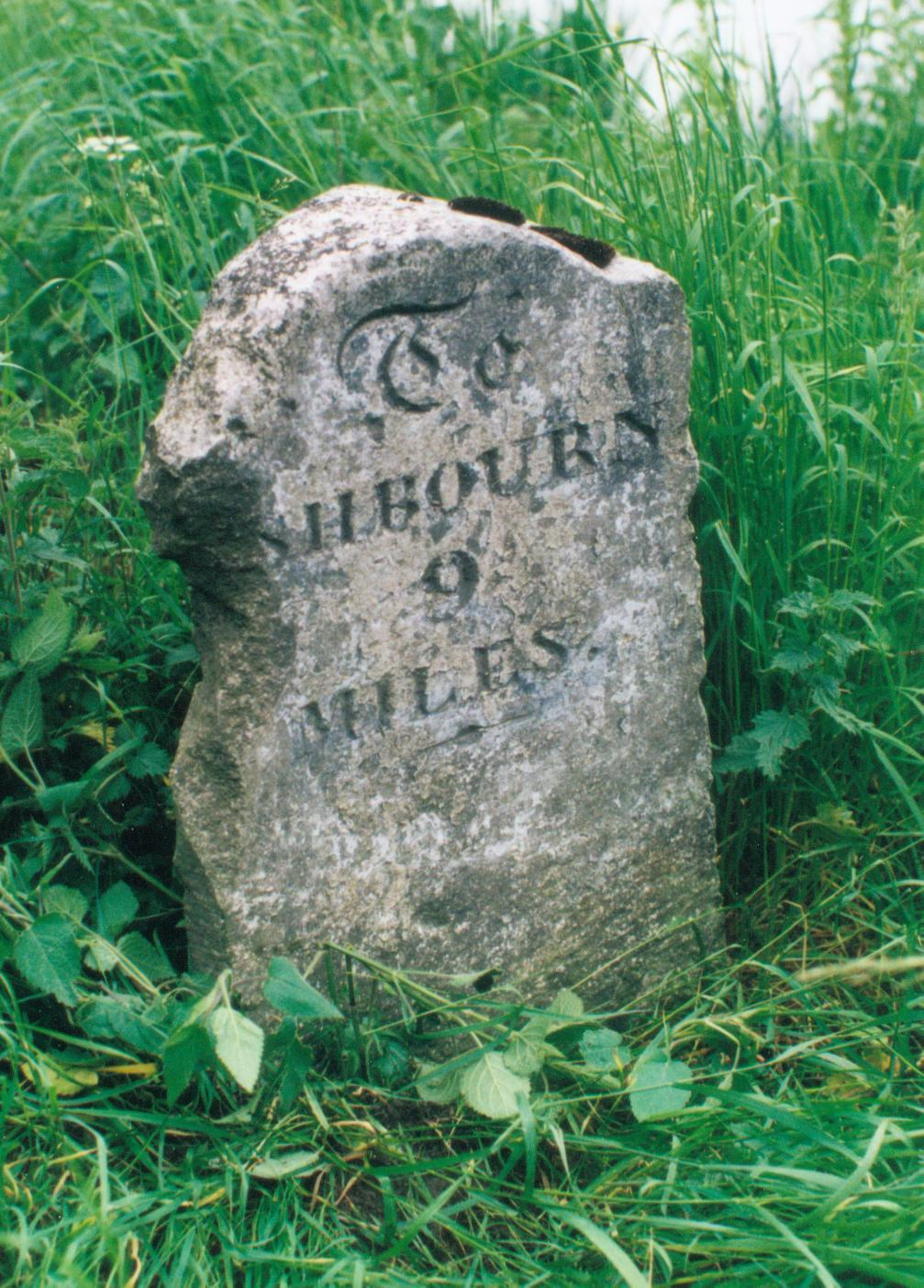
Listed milestone by the B5056 road, north of Grangemill

There are 14 residents recorded within Ivonbrook Grange parish for the 2021 census.

=== Local bodies ===
Because of its small population, Ivonbrook Grange is managed at the first level of public administration via parish meetings, there is no parish council. At district level, the wider area is overseen by Derbyshire Dales district council as part of the Bonsall & Winster ward, and because of its inclusion within a national park, the Peak District Park Authority. The parish is within the Wirksworth electoral division of Derbyshire County Council, which provides the highest level strategic services locally. Ivonbrook Grange is within the Derbyshire Dales constituency.

== Landmarks ==
There is one listed structure within the parish, a milestone by the B5056, north of Grangemill, at Grade II designation.
