= Grangemill =

Village in Derbyshire, United Kingdom

Coordinates: 53.11503°N 1.63841°W

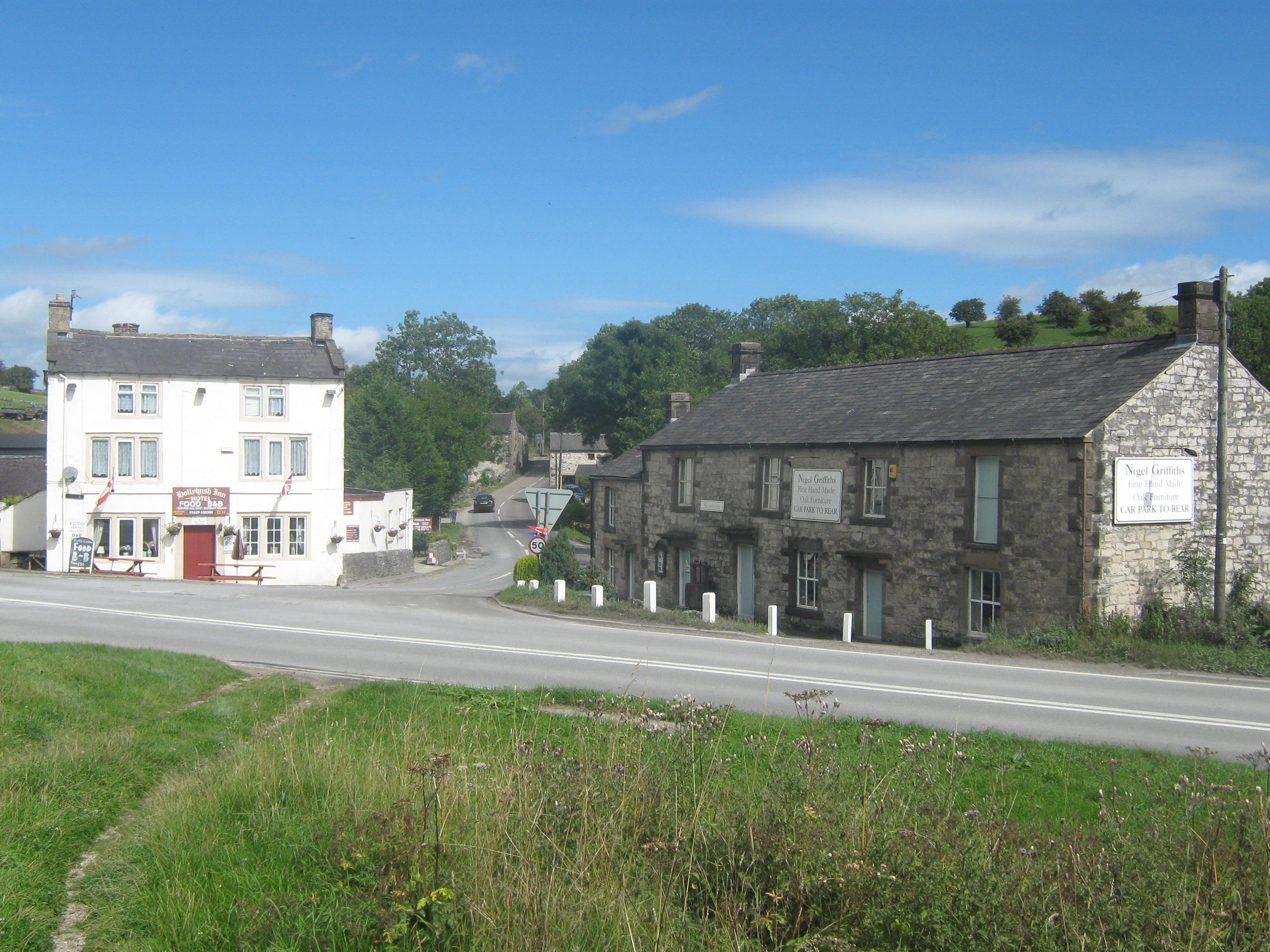
The crossroads

Grangemill is a village in the English county of Derbyshire. The hamlet is made up of a cluster of houses, a farm and a pub called the Hollybush. There is a former cheese factory in the village, and the workings of this are still on display. The population as taken at the 2011 Census is included in the civil parish of Aldwark, Derbyshire, The majority of the settlement is within the Ivonbrook Grange parish, however Grangemill lies at the crossroads of the A5012 and B5056 roads which is within Brassington parish. It is on the south-eastern boundary of the Peak District National Park. The Limestone Way long-distance bridleway passes through Grangemill. The Peak District Boundary Walk also runs through the village.

There are several quarries that surround Grange Mill, in which all extract limestone from the area. The most noticeable being the Brassington Moor Quarry.

== See also ==
- Listed buildings in Brassington
