= Harboro' Rocks =

Hill in the Derbyshire Peak District

- Harborough Rocks
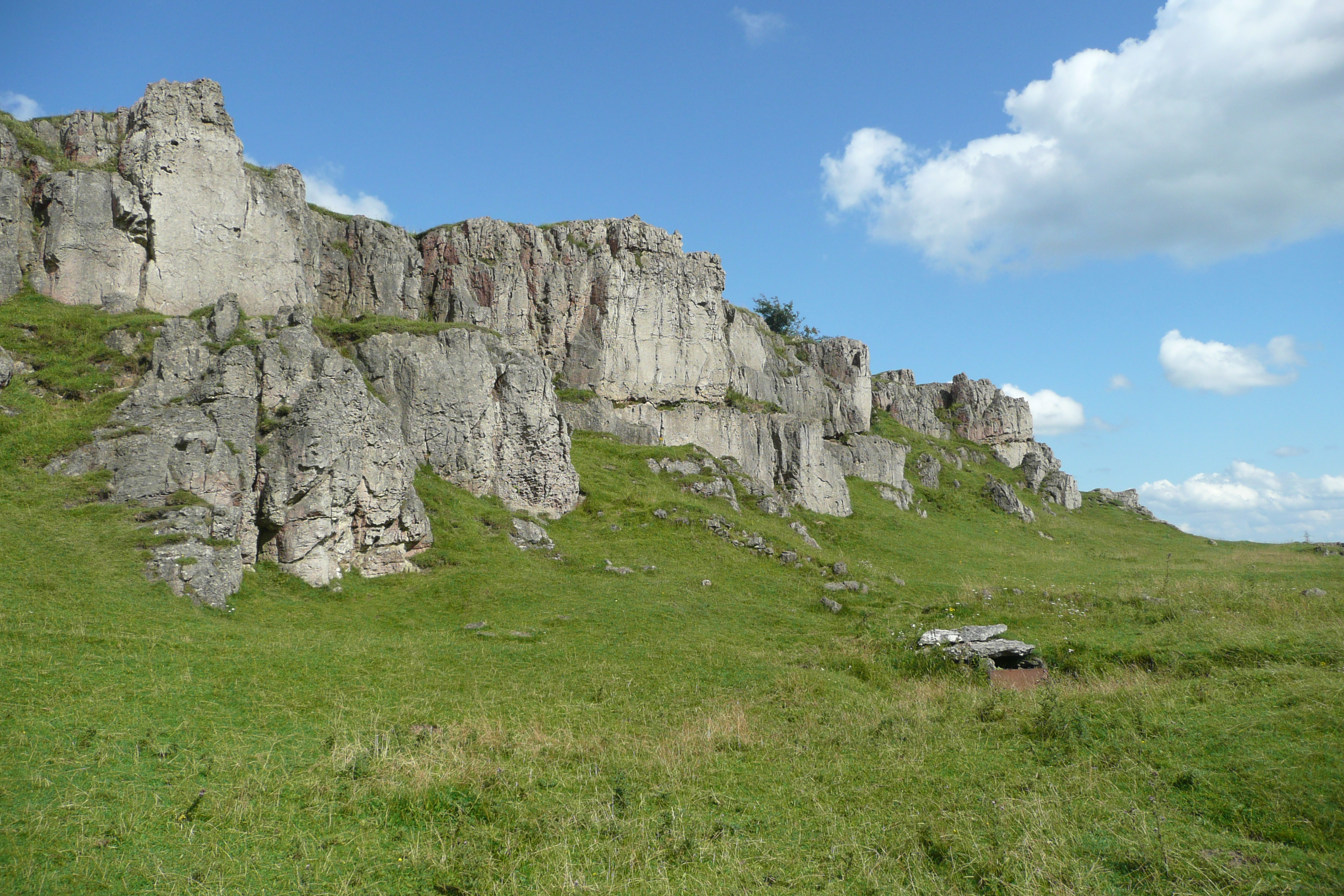
- Harboro' Rocks from the High Peak Trail

Highest point
- Elevation: 379 metres (1,243 ft)
- Coordinates: 53.0926°N 1.6530°W

Geography
- Location: Brassington, Derbyshire, England
- OS grid: SK243553
- Topo map: OS Explorer OL24

Harboro' Rocks (or Harborough Rocks) is a dolomitic limestone hill near the village of Brassington in the Derbyshire Peak District. The summit is 379 metres (1,243 ft) above sea level with views across to Carsington Water. On a clear day, the Wrekin and the Clee Hills in Shropshire can be seen.

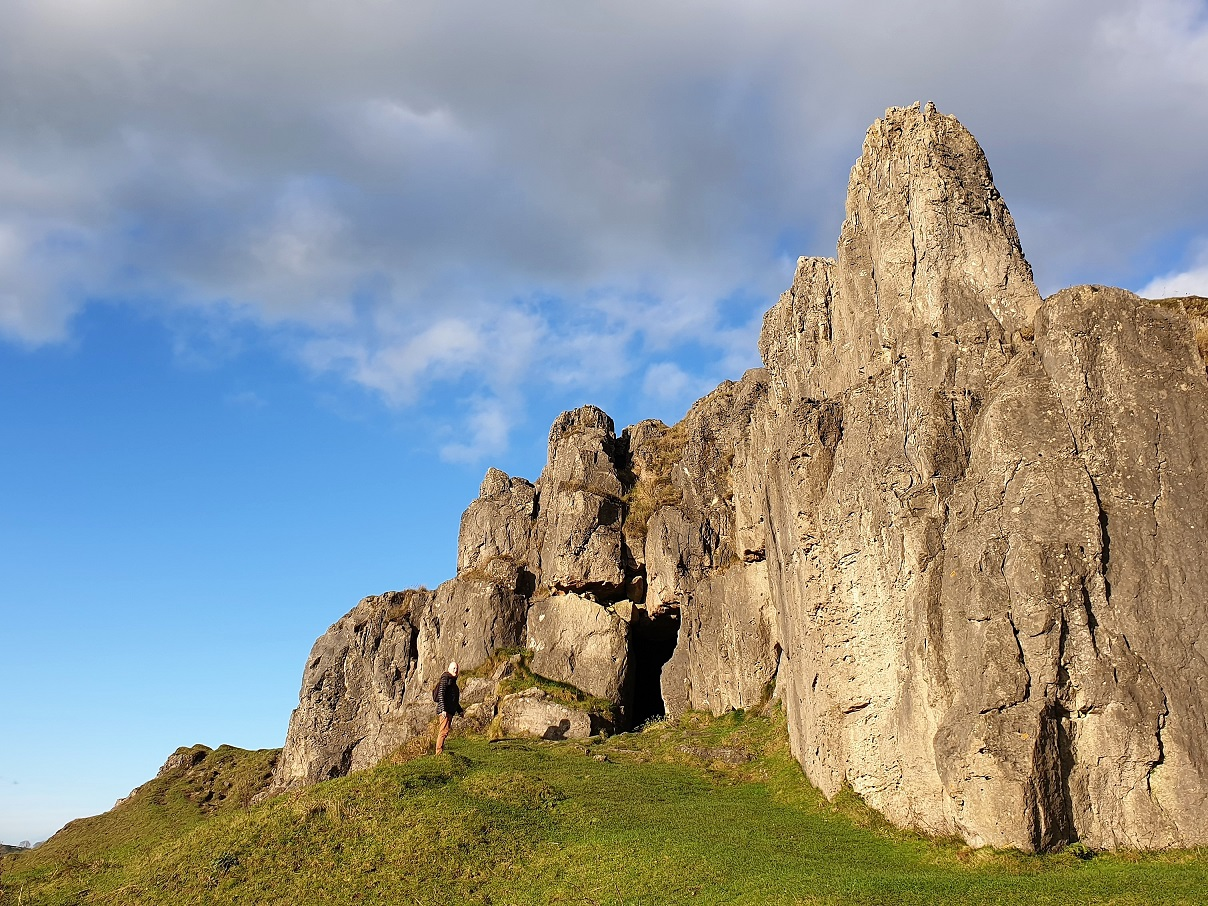
Harboro' Cave entrance

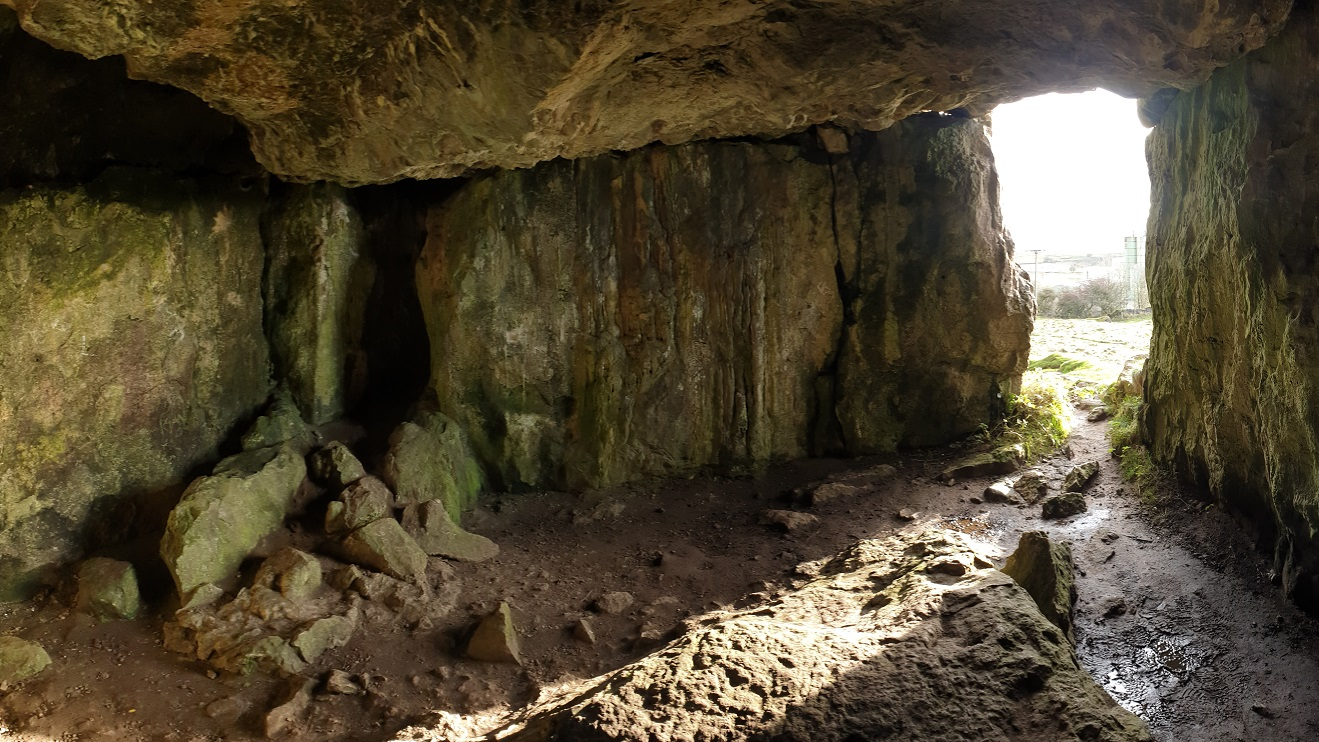
Cave interior at Harboro' Rocks

Harboro' Cave is a natural cavern in the rocks where archaeologists have found evidence of human occupants since the Ice Age. Satirist author Daniel Defoe reported in his book Tour thro' the whole Island of Great Britain (published in 1726) that a poor family of seven was living in the cave. Defoe described how the father was a lead miner and was "lean as a skeleton, pale as a dead corps" but that they "seemed to live very pleasantly". The cave is a protected Scheduled Monument. There is a settlement site and chambered cairns nearby.

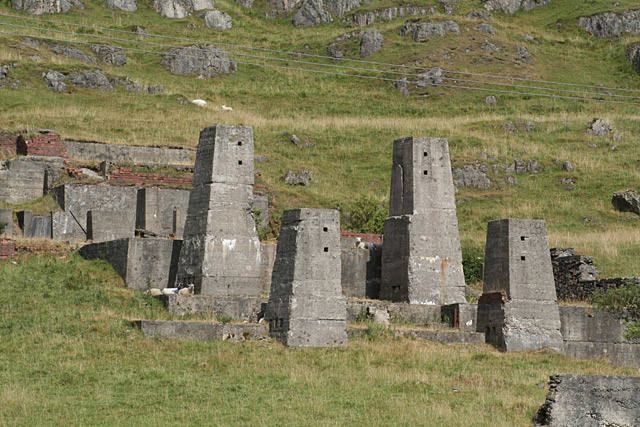
Former industrial works at Harboro' Rocks

The Golconda lead mine, on the north east side of the hill, was part of the Gell family's Griffe Grange mining liberty, which ran from the summit of Harboro' Rocks to Via Gellia. The mine dates back to the 1700s and the mine shaft is over 100 metres (330 ft) deep. Golconda is a name used for wealthy mines, after the famous Indian Golconda diamond mine. The mine's tunnels enter natural caverns such as the Great Shack. After closing in 1913, the mine was reopened in 1915 to mine baryte until 1953. Furnace-lining bricks have been manufactured from local quartz sand at Harborough brickworks for many years (recently by Hobens Minerals and previously by Swan Ratcliffe).

Most of the White Peak is a carboniferous limestone plateau. This unusual jagged outcrop of dolomitic limestone offers interesting buttresses, arêtes and pinnacles for rock climbing (and some easy bouldering) with over 100 graded routes.

Nearby Rainster Rocks is another dolomitic limestone crag and is the site of a Romano-British settlement and field system from the 3rd century. The remains include enclosures with walls made of upright boulders (orthostats) and earthwork terraces. Excavations have found pottery fragments, metalwork and coins. The site is a listed ancient Scheduled Monument. Rainster Rocks was also a popular rock climbing location (with over 80 graded routes) and has been climbed for over 100 years. However the landowners have imposed an outright ban on climbing there since 2018.

The land around Harboro' Rocks is designated as "Open Access" land for the public, following the Countryside and Rights of Way Act 2000.

The High Peak Trail and the Midshires Way footpaths follow the same route along the south west side of the hill. The Limestone Way long-distance footpath passes the north west side of the hill.
