= Longcliffe =

Hamlet in Derbyshire, England

Coordinates: 53.09803°N 1.66394°W

Longcliffe is a crossroads hamlet in the English county of Derbyshire.

It lies on the B5056 road where it is crossed by the Brassington-Elton road. The Midshires Way long-distance footpath and the Peak District Boundary Walk skirt the same route south and west of Longcliffe.

Longcliffe is close to Hoe Grange Quarry, the first Butterfly Reserve in Derbyshire. The company relinquished permitted reserves within Hoe Grange quarry in order to promote the site's wildlife. The reserve is managed by the Derbyshire Wildlife Trust.

== See also ==
- Listed buildings in Brassington
