= Belcher's Bar =

Hamlet in Leicestershire, England

Coordinates: 52.66°N 01.40°W

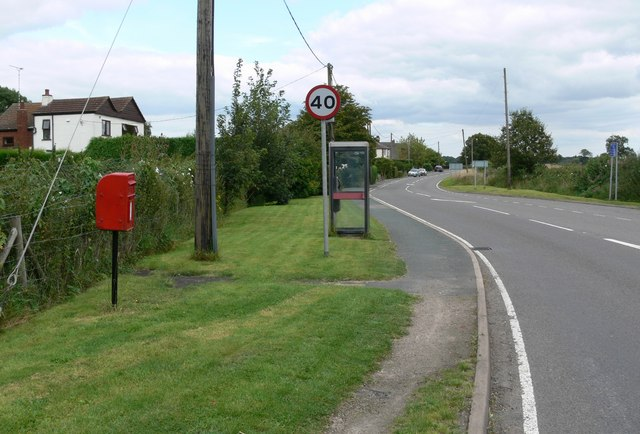
- Belcher's Bar in 2007

- Location within Leicestershire
- OS grid reference: SK4008
- Civil parish: Nailstone
- District: Hinckley and Bosworth
- Shire county: Leicestershire
- Region: East Midlands
- Country: England
- Sovereign state: United Kingdom
- Police: Leicestershire
- Fire: Leicestershire
- Ambulance: East Midlands

Belcher's Bar is a hamlet in Leicestershire, England.

Belcher's Bar is located at the junction of the A447 and B582 roads in the parish of Nailstone.
