= Listed buildings in Brassington =

Brassington is a civil parish in the Derbyshire Dales district of Derbyshire, England. The parish contains 37 listed buildings that are recorded in the National Heritage List for England. Of these, two are listed at Grade II*, the middle of the three grades, and the others are at Grade II, the lowest grade. The parish contains the village of Brassington, the smaller settlements of Grangemill and Longcliffe, and the surrounding countryside. In the parish are two surviving military buildings, an observation post and a monitoring station. The Cromford and High Peak Railway, now closed, ran through the parish, and the listed buildings associated with it are a station and a bridge. Most of the listed buildings are houses, cottages and associated structures, farmhouses and farm buildings. The other listed buildings include a church, a chapel, public houses, a former toll house, a milestone, and a former cheese factory.

== Key ==
Grade	Criteria
II*	Particularly important buildings of more than special interest
II	Buildings of national importance and special interest

== Buildings ==
Name and location	Photograph	Date	Notes	Grade
St James' Church; 53.08569°N 1.65756°W		Late 12th century	The church has been altered and extended through the centuries, and in 1879–81 the chancel was enlarged, and the north aisle was added. The church is built in limestone with gritstone dressings, and has a slate roof with decorative ridge tiles. It consists of a nave with a clerestory, north and south aisles, a south porch, a chancel with a partial clerestory, and a west tower. The tower is Norman, and has buttresses, a blocked west doorway, two-light Norman bell openings, a decorative string course, and an embattled parapet. In the porch is a Norman arch with a moulded surround, and at the east end is a rose window.	II*
Tudor House; 53.08515°N 1.65487°W		1615	The house, which was altered in 1820 when it was used as a workhouse, is in limestone with gritstone dressings, and a tile roof with coped gables and finials. There are two storeys and attics, and two gabled bays, the left bay projecting. The right bay contains a doorway with an inscribed and dated lintel and mullioned windows. The windows in the left bay are mullioned and transomed.	II
The Gate Inn; 53.08469°N 1.65821°W		1616	The public house, which was altered in 1874, is in limestone with a projecting eaves band and a tile roof. There are two storeys, three bays, and a single-storey gabled projection on the left with stone copings and kneelers. On the front is a projecting gabled porch with the date 1874 and initials in the gable, and a blocked doorway with a lintel dated 1616, partly infilled with a casement window. Elsewhere, there is a doorway, and windows, most of which are mullioned.	II*
Brassington Hall; 53.08410°N 1.65971°W	—	17th century	A house that was much altered in the 19h century, it is in limestone with gritstone dressings, quoins, a string course, and a tile roof. There are two storeys and attics, and a U-shaped plan, with a central range of three bays, and projecting gabled cross-wings. The ground floor of the central range projects, and contains a round-headed porch with a moulded architrave and three ball finials. Above it is a single-light window, and the other windows are mullioned, some with hood moulds.	II
Dragon Cottages; 53.08545°N 1.65520°W		17th century	A pair of cottages that were remodelled in the 18th century. They are in limestone on a plinth, with quoins, a floor band, a coved eaves band, and a tile roof with coped gables and moulded kneelers. There are two storeys and five bays. The doorways have plain surrounds and hoods, and the windows are mullioned with two lights.	II
Ivybank; 53.08519°N 1.65822°W	—	17th century	The house, which was much altered in the 19th century, is in limestone, partly rendered, with gritstone dressings, quoins, and a tile roof with coped gables, kneelers, and finials. There is an irregular plan, consisting of a main range with two storeys, and a cross-wing with two storeys and attics, and the main range has two gabled projections. On the front is a porch, and the windows vary.	II
House south of Ivybank; 53.08509°N 1.65819°W	—	17th century	The house, which was remodelled in 1737, is in limestone with a projecting eaves band and a tile roof. There are three storeys, two bays, and a two-storey two-bay extension on the left. The doorway has an initialled and dated lintel. The windows in the original part are mullioned with two lights, and in the extension they are casements.	II
House adjoining the Miners Arms; 53.08564°N 1.65660°W		17th century	The house, which was extended in the 18h century, is in limestone, with quoins, and coped gables with kneelers. The roof of the original part is tiled, and the extension has a slate roof. The earlier part has two storeys and attics, and the extension has two storeys. The windows are a mix; some are mullioned, some are casements, and the others are sashes.	II
Sundial Cottage; 53.08422°N 1.66246°W		17th century	A limestone house with quoins, and a tile roof with coped gables and kneelers. There are two storeys and two bays. On the front are two doorways, one with a chamfered lintel, the other with a hood mould. The windows are mullioned, those in the upper floor in gabled dormers. On the left return is a sundial.	II
Sycamore Farm; 53.08473°N 1.65432°W	—	17th century	A farmhouse in limestone with gritstone dressings, and a tile roof with coped gables. There are two storeys and three bays. The doorway has a quoined surround, and the windows are casements, most with mullions, and those in the ground floor with hood moulds.	II
The Cottage; 53.08660°N 1.65552°W	—	17th century	The house, which was remodelled in the 19th century, is in limestone with gritstone dressings, quoins, a projecting brick eaves band, and a tile roof. There are two storeys and three bays. The doorway has a quoined and chamfered surround and a massive lintel, and the windows vary.	II
The Green Cottage; 53.08399°N 1.65459°W	—	17th century	The house is in limestone with gritstone dressings, quoins, and a stone slate roof with coped gables and moulded kneelers. There are three storeys, two bays, and a single-storey extension on the left. On the left is a blocked doorway with a quoined surround and an inserted sash window. To the right is a doorway inserted into a former window opening, and the other windows are mullioned.	II
Church Gate Cottage; 53.08597°N 1.65669°W		18th century	Two cottages combined, with possibly an earlier core, the building is in limestone, with quoins, and a tile roof with coped gables and moulded kneelers. There are two storeys and attics, and to the west is a single-storey wing with gritstone dressings. On the front is a doorway with a chamfered surround, a blocked doorway with an inserted casement window, and mullioned windows, with some mullions removed.	II
Cottage behind Wash Hills Farm; 53.08385°N 1.65412°W	—	18th century	The cottage is in limestone with quoins, and a tile roof with coped gables and kneelers. There are three storeys and a front of a single bay, and a single-storey projection on the west. The windows are mullioned with two lights.	II
Hollybush Inn; 53.11548°N 1.63752°W		Mid 18th century	The public house is in rendered stone, and has a slate roof with coped gables and kneelers. There are three storeys, and an L-shaped plan, with a front of two bays and rear outshuts. The windows are mullioned with casements, and have three lights in the lower two floors, and two lights in the top floor.	II
Pleasant House; 53.08574°N 1.65602°W		18th century	The house is in limestone with quoins, a projecting eaves band, and a slate roof with coped gables and kneelers. There are three storeys, three bays, and a two-storey single-bay extension on the right. Above the central doorway is a single-light window, the other windows in the main part are mullioned with two lights, and in the extension is a sash window.	II
Rake House Farmhouse; 53.08608°N 1.65484°W	—	18th century	The farmhouse, with a possible earlier core, is in limestone, rendered on the front, with gritstone dressings and a tile roof. There are two storeys, a double pile plan, three bays, and two gables on the front. In the centre is a doorway with a stone hood on brackets, above it is a single-light window, the other windows are casements, and at the rear are the remains of a mullioned window.	II
Barns, Sycamore Farm; 53.08472°N 1.65469°W	—	18th century	The barns are in limestone with tile roofs. They are partly in two storeys, and partly in a single storey. The front flanking the road is blind, apart from a small window and vents.	II
The Green; 53.08420°N 1.65437°W	—	18th century	The house is in limestone with gritstone dressings, quoins, and a tile roof. There are three storeys and three bays. On the front are two doorways, and the windows are mullioned.	II
Well House; 53.08384°N 1.66165°W	—	18th century	A limestone house with gritstone dressings, quoins, and a tile roof. There are three storeys and three bays. On the front are two doorways, and most of the windows are mullioned and contain casements.	II
The Manor House; 53.08521°N 1.65760°W		1774	The house is in limestone with gritstone dressings, quoins, and a tile roof. There are three storeys, two parallel ranges, and a front of three bays. On the front is a porch, the windows are mullioned, and at the rear is a bay window. There are also datestones dated 1774 and 1860.	II
Brookfield Farmhouse; 53.08315°N 1.66252°W	—	Late 18th century	The farmhouse is in limestone, with quoins, a projecting eaves band, and a stone slate roof with coped gables and kneelers. There are three storeys and three bays. The central doorway has a massive lintel, and the windows are top-hung casements, those in the middle bay with a single light, and those in the outer bays with two lights and mullions.	II
House adjoining Green Cottage; 53.08407°N 1.65461°W	—	Late 18th century	The house is in limestone with gritstone dressings, quoins, and a tile roof. There are two storeys at the front and three at the rear, a front of three bays, and a single-bay extension on the right. The doorway in the left bay and the windows, which are casements, have plain surrounds, and in the right bay are a blocked doorway and a blocked window above.	II
Miners Arms and outbuildings 53.08565°N 1.65640°W		Late 18th century	The public house was extended to the right in 1882. The original part is mainly rendered, and the extension is in limestone with gritstone dressings and quoins, and the roofs are tiled. The original part has three storeys and two gabled bays, and it contains a doorway and sash windows. The extension has two storeys and three bays, the right bay recessed. It contains a doorway, casement windows in the left two bays, and mullioned windows in the right bay. To the left are projecting outbuildings with external steps.	II
Red Lion House; 53.08628°N 1.65655°W		Late 18th century	The house is in limestone with quoins, a projecting eaves band, and a slate roof with a coped gable and kneelers. There are three storeys and three bays. The windows are mullioned with two lights, and contain small-pane casements.	II
Tithe Farmhouse; 53.11202°N 1.67462°W	—	Late 18th century	The farmhouse is in rendered limestone with gritstone dressings, quoins, and a tile roof. There are three storeys and three bays. In the centre is a gabled porch, and the windows are sashes.	II
Toll Bar Cowshed; 53.11531°N 1.63795°W		Late 18th century	The former toll house has later been since been used for other purposes. It is in limestone, partly rendered, with gritstone dressings, and a tile roof with coped gables and kneelers. There is a single storey, and it contains a doorway with a flat hood, and windows, most of which are mullioned.	II
West End Manor; 53.08429°N 1.66221°W	—	1793	A limestone house with quoins, a projecting eaves band, and a tile roof. There are three storeys, two bays, and a two-storey single-bay extension on the left. In the centre is a doorway with a massive quoined surround, and under the eaves is a datestone. The windows are mullioned with two lights.	II
Griffe Walk Farmhouse; 53.10117°N 1.63791°W	—	Late 18th to early 19th century	The farmhouse is in rendered stone with a slate roof. There are two storeys, three bays, and a later bay added on the left. On the front is a porch, and above it is a single-light window. The other windows in the original part are mullioned with two casements, and in the extension they are modern.	II
Yew Tree Farmhouse; 53.08443°N 1.66109°W	—	Early 19th century	A limestone farmhouse with gritstone dressings, a projecting eaves band, and a tile roof. There are two storeys and three bays. The central doorway has a moulded canopy on brackets, and the windows are sashes. To the right are outbuildings containing a doorway with a quoined surround and a massive lintel, and a small window.	II
Longcliffe Station; 53.09799°N 1.66430°W		c. 1830	The station was built by the Cromford and High Peak Railway and is now closed. The station building is in limestone with gritstone dressings, quoins, overhanging eaves, and a tile roof. There is a single storey and a rectangular plan. The building contains double doors with a quoined surround.	II
Railway Bridge; 53.09824°N 1.66499°W		c. 1830	The bridge was built by the Cromford and High Peak Railway to carry its line over the B5056 road. The abutments are in limestone, and they carry fish-bellied cast iron beams and wooden decking. Above are later metal railings.	II
Primitive Methodist Chapel; 53.08541°N 1.65904°W		1834	The former chapel is in limestone with gritstone dressings, quoins, and a tile roof. There is a single storey and a rectangular plan. On the west is a gabled porch, and in the north front are two round-headed windows with keystones, imposts, and wooden shutters.	II
Milestone; 53.09853°N 1.66317°W		19th century	The milestone is on the north side of the B5056 road in Longcliffe. It consists of a rectangular stone slab with a shouldered and rounded head. The milestone is inscribed with the distances to Bakewell and Ashbourne.	II
Nigel Griffiths Furniture Workshop; 53.11533°N 1.63723°W		1875	A purpose-built cheese factory, later used as a workshop, it is in limestone with gritstone dressings, quoins, and a slate roof. There are two storeys and five bays, the left bay lower and recessed. On the front are four doorways with hoods, an inscribed and dated stone, and sash windows.	II
World War Two Observation Post; 53.09410°N 1.66253°W	—	1930s	The observation post is in red brick with a rectangular plan and two storeys, and is about 3.5 metres (11 ft) high. External steps lead to the upper floor, which is open-topped, and from it steps lead down into the interior. Attached to the north wall is an external toilet.	II
Cold War Underground Monitoring Station; 53.09319°N 1.66180°W	—	1964	The monitoring post is entirely underground, and covered by a grassy mound. It is constructed in concrete, with a ventilation shaft at each end, and an entrance shaft at the south end. Inside there are two rooms, one containing a chemical toilet, and the other is a larger operations room.	II
