= A447 road =

Road in Leicestershire

A447

Major junctions
- South end: Hinckley
- A47 A511
- North end: Coalville

Location
- Country: United Kingdom
- Constituent country: England
- Primary destinations: Ibstock; Ravenstone

Road network
- Roads in the United Kingdom; Motorways; A and B road zones
← A446	→ A448

The A447 is a road in Leicestershire, England, which links traffic from Hinckley to Coalville.

== Route ==
=== Hinckley - Ibstock ===
Starting on the A47 crossroad in Hinckley, it heads for Market Bosworth then passing the junction with the B585 then it heads for Ibstock.

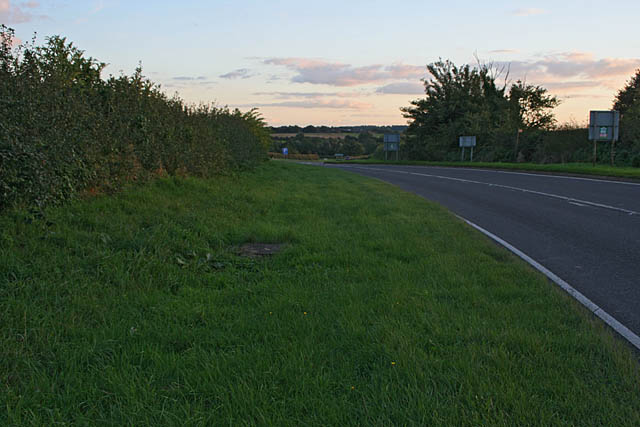
A447 Ibstock Road

=== Ibstock - Coalville ===
Leaving Ibstock, it heads for Ravenstone then it heads onto Coalville, ending here.

== History ==
The original (1922) route of the A447 was Wolvey to Tonge, via Hinckley, Ibstock and Coalville, but they were changes in the early years.

=== Wolvey to Hinckley ===
The route from Wolvey to Hinckley was renumbered B4109.

=== Coalville to Tonge ===
The route from Coalville to Tonge is unknown.
