= Gawthwaite =

Village in Cumbria, England

Coordinates: 54.254°N 3.120°W

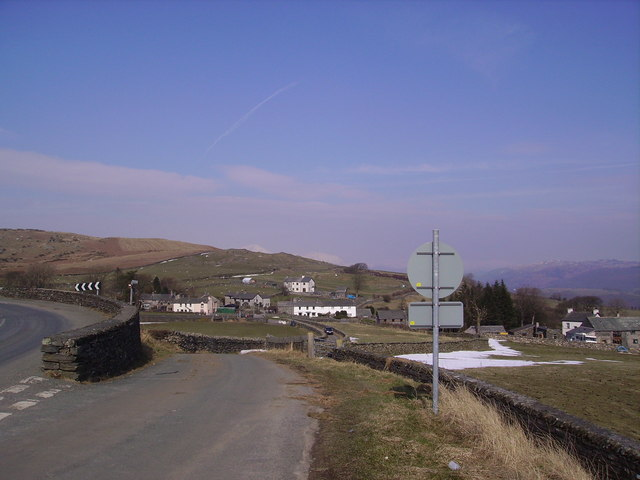
- Gawthwaite

- Location in South Lakeland Location within Cumbria
- OS grid reference: SD270848
- Civil parish: Blawith and Subberthwaite
- Unitary authority: Westmorland and Furness
- Ceremonial county: Cumbria
- Region: North West
- Country: England
- Sovereign state: United Kingdom
- Post town: ULVERSTON
- Postcode district: LA12
- Dialling code: 01229
- Police: Cumbria
- Fire: Cumbria
- Ambulance: North West
- UK Parliament: Westmorland and Lonsdale

Gawthwaite is a village in Cumbria, England. It is located along the A5092 road, 4.8 miles (7.7 km) north of Ulverston. It is on the Gawthwaite Beck stream, on the edge of Lake District National Park.

Gawthwaite High Quarry is in the vicinity.

Before it became the A5092, the road through the village was the B5280: this can still be seen on the two village roadsigns, which are clearly visible on Google Street View.
