= Ible =

Hamlet in Derbyshire, England

Coordinates: 53.111°N 1.630°W

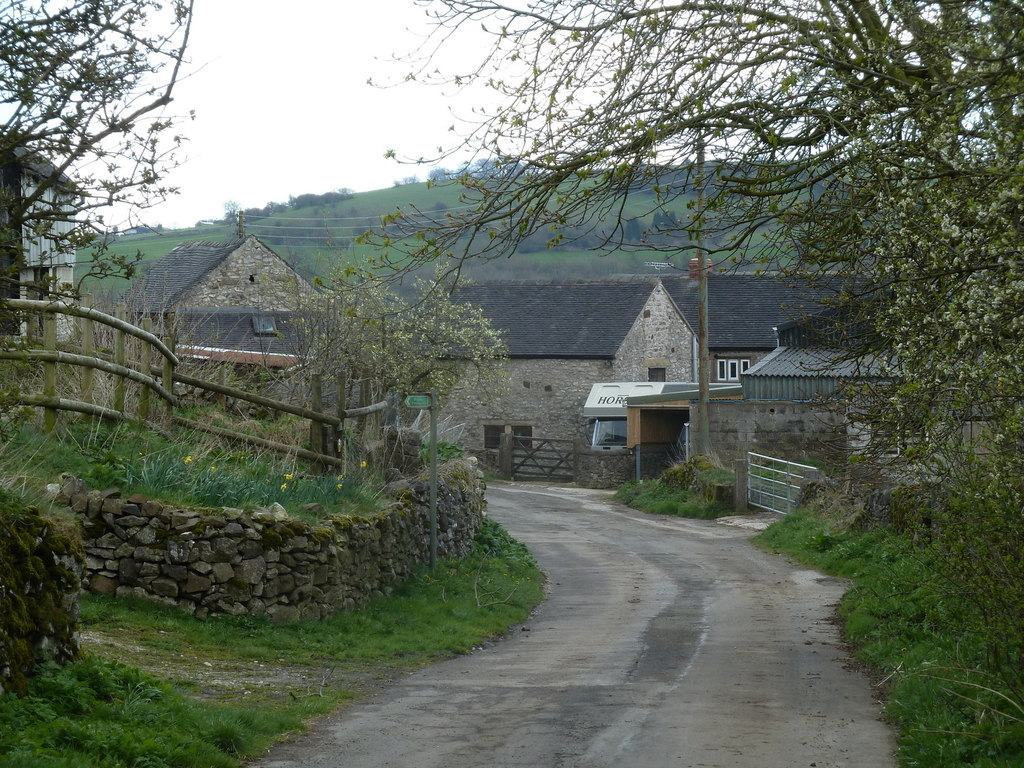
- Lane through Ible

- Location within Derbyshire
- OS grid reference: SK248571
- District: Derbyshire Dales
- Shire county: Derbyshire
- Region: East Midlands
- Country: England
- Sovereign state: United Kingdom
- Post town: MATLOCK
- Postcode district: DE4
- Police: Derbyshire
- Fire: Derbyshire
- Ambulance: East Midlands

Ible (pronounced 'eyebull', or 'ib-ull') is a hamlet in Derbyshire, England, just within the Peak District National Park.

It is near the Via Gellia valley, the historic market town of Wirksworth and village of Bonsall, and is on the route of the Limestone Way and the Peak District Boundary Walk.

The name of the hamlet is derived from the Old English for "Ibba's Hollow".
