= Brassington =

Village in Derbyshire, England

Coordinates: 53.085°N 1.656°W

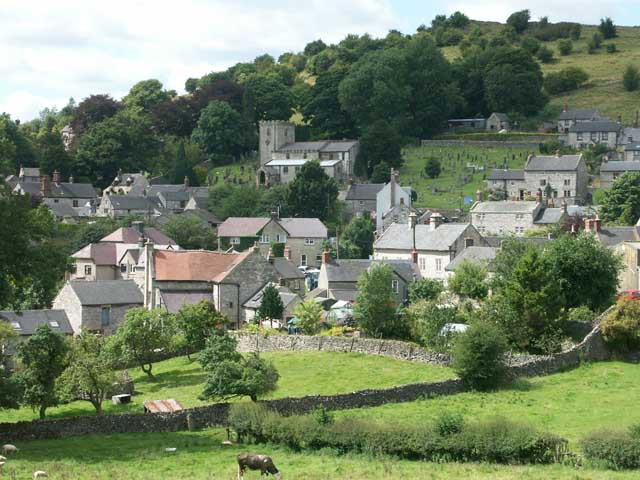
- Brassington village

- Location within Derbyshire
- Population: 573 (2011)
- OS grid reference: SK231542
- District: Derbyshire Dales
- Shire county: Derbyshire
- Region: East Midlands
- Country: England
- Sovereign state: United Kingdom
- Post town: MATLOCK
- Postcode district: DE4
- Police: Derbyshire
- Fire: Derbyshire
- Ambulance: East Midlands
- UK Parliament: Derbyshire Dales

Brassington is a village and civil parish in the Derbyshire Dales district of Derbyshire, 16 miles north west of Derby. The parish had a population of 573 at the 2011 census.

The name, spelled Branzinctun in the Domesday Book, is thought to mean "Brand's people's place". Most of the houses in the village are built of local limestone, and most are 200 or 300 years old; there are 20th-century houses at the south end of the village.

The oldest dated house, named Tudor House since the late 19th century, was built in 1615. It is located on Town Street (grid reference SK232543) and was an inn until 1820, when it was bought by the parish and was used as a workhouse until 1848. There were 15 inmates at the 1841 census, but the number rose considerably in 1845, when the Brassington Poor Law Union was wound up and Brassington joined the new Ashbourne Union. The Brassington workhouse, augmented by the nearby George and Dragon pub, served the new union while a new workhouse was built in Ashbourne. The workhouse could hold 130 inmates. The house has been a private house since 1848, and its owner in the 1890s added the words Tudor House to its 1615 datestone. This has the initials of Thomas Westerne, its builder, and his wife Anne.

The Norman church, repaired and enlarged in the 19th century, stands on the north side of the steep valley in which the village lies. There were formerly three Nonconformist chapels, two of which are now closed and one demolished. The former Congregational chapel, at the northern entrance to the village, is now the village hall; the Primitive Methodist chapel, built by its members in 1834 above the church on the hillside, is a private house; the Wesleyan Reform chapel, at the west end of the village, was demolished in 2007. A house built on the site incorporates a plaque formerly set high on the chapel's frontage and a brass commemorative plate. In addition to the village hall, a meeting place was provided in the 1990s by a British Legion building in the village centre. There are two pubs, the Olde Gate (where Bonnie Prince Charlie’s soldiers were billeted on their march to London and some of the oak beams came from ships of the Spanish Armada) which has a 1616 datestone and a largely 19th-century interior, and the Miners Arms, which was modernised thirty years ago, and which was once the venue for the manor court and the lead miners' Barmote Court. The school was built in 1872, after the passing of the Elementary Education Act 1870, and is now a primary school.

In addition to agriculture, which still provides employment for a few villagers, Brassington was for centuries dependent on lead mining. The rough ground to the east, west and north has the hillocks and hollows of hundreds of abandoned mines; there are also remains of the miners' buildings on some of the sites. There is current employment in the village in heavy goods transport, steel fabrication and furniture manufacture, though most of the villagers are employed elsewhere. Until recently, there was no shop, but in July 2014 the village became the second in the UK (after Clifton, Derbyshire) to have a 'Speedy Shop' installed by local business Villagevending.com. The shop sells a range of essentials and other items using an automatic retailing machine styled like a traditional shop. There are bus services to Ashbourne and Wirksworth.

The nearby Harboro' Rocks and Rainster Rocks are dolomitic limestone outcrops. Harboro' Rocks has a history of mining lead and baryte. Harboro' Cave is a natural cavern which was occupied as far back as the Ice Age and it is a Scheduled Monument. The remains of a Romano-British settlement at Rainster Rocks is also a protected Scheduled Monument.

The Limestone Way long-distance footpath passes close to the village.

== See also ==
- Listed buildings in Brassington
