= A5012 road =

Road in Derbyshire, England

A5012

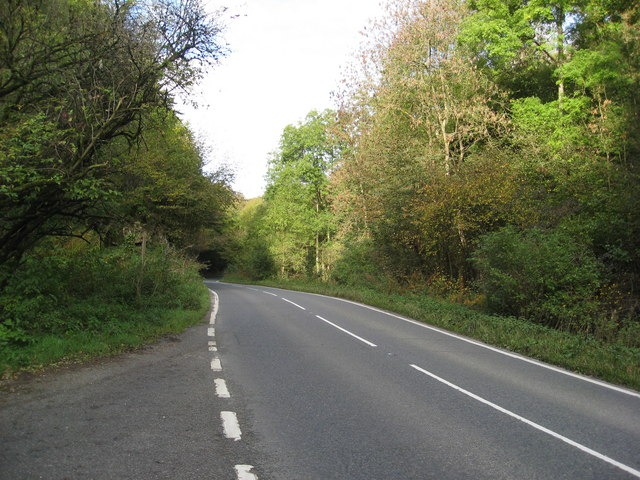
- The A5012, Via Gellia, passing through Griffe Grange Valley

Major junctions
- From: Newhaven
- To: Cromford

Location
- Country: United Kingdom
- Constituent country: England

Road network
- Roads in the United Kingdom; Motorways; A and B road zones

The A5012 road is a main road in the south of the English county of Derbyshire.

== Route ==
Around 9 miles (14 km) in length, it connects two primary north–south routes; the A6 at Cromford and the A515 between Buxton and Ashbourne. It passes through Pikehall and Grangemill and alongside Ible.

== Via Gellia ==
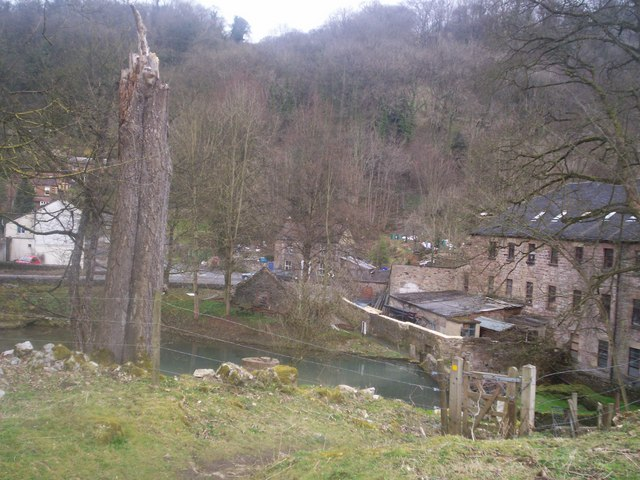
Former mill viewed from the footpath below Slinter Wood. The Via Gellia road is behind the pond and was used to transport lead from the mines above Bonsall to the smelter and canal wharf at Cromford.

The eastern part (Grangemill to Cromford, set in a deep valley) is known as the Via Gellia – a steep-sided wooded dry valley and road.

It is probably named after (or by) Philip Eyre Gell in a mock-Latin style; he was responsible for building the road through the valley, the name being a link to the Gell family's claim of Roman descent. They held lead-mining interests in and around Wirksworth. At its lower (eastern) end is the village of Cromford and its Georgian mill, built by inventor and entrepreneur Richard Arkwright. At the western end is the hamlet of Grangemill.

The road appears to have been constructed about 1790 to connect the Gells' extensive lead-mining interests around Wirksworth with a new smelter at Cromford. However, some sources say that the route was in use as early as 1720 for transporting stone from the family's quarries in the Hopton area.

In 1887, it was described as a "modern road, (in) Derbyshire, on route from Matlock Bath to Ashborne, in a deep winding valley, extending 4 miles from Cromford to Grange Mill; takes name from its constructors, the Gell family of Hopton Hall, near Wirksworth." in the Gazetteer of the British Isles.

=== Modern history ===
In modern times the Via Gellia developed a reputation as being a dangerous road with a disproportionately high casualty rate, particularly among motorcyclists. This was due in part to its relative narrowness, the number of large goods vehicles using it to access the quarries, and its canopy of overhanging trees resulting in a persistently damp surface. Remedial measures, including resurfacing, were carried out by Derbyshire County Council in 2006.

=== World War I ===
In World War I, the name Via Gellia was assigned to a communication trench between Kemmel village and the British and Canadian front lines facing the German front lines before Wijtschate in Belgium.

== Safety ==
The road has a poor safety record and is ranked the third-worst in Britain by EuroRAP. Average speed check cameras (SPECS) will be fitted early in 2025 along with a reduction in speed limits.

== Fabric viyella ==
The fabric Viyella, a wool and cotton mix, is named after the Via Gellia, the location of W. Hollins & Company's textile mill where it was originally produced.
