= List of road junctions in the United Kingdom: B =

This is a partial list of road junctions in the United Kingdom.

Many road junctions are named after pubs. For more information regarding the derivation of pub names, see pub names.

== B ==
Junction name	Type	Location	Roads	Grid reference	Notes
Babworth Crossroads	Crossroads	Babworth, Nottinghamshire	A620 Babworth Road; A620 Straight Mile; B6420 Mansfield Road; Sutton Lane	53°19′05″N 0°58′34″W	
Baillieston Interchange	Roundabout Interchange	Glasgow	M73 J2; M8 J8; A8 Glasgow and Edinburgh Road; A89 Coatbridge Road	55°51′10″N 4°05′22″W	webcam
Baker Street Interchange	Trumpet Interchange	Baker Street, near Orsett, Thurrock (formerly Essex)	A13; A1089 Dock Approach Road	51°30′9″N 0°21′13″E	A13 trunk road status transferred to the A1089, the route into Tilbury
Baker Street Junction	Crossroads	City of Westminster, London	A41 Baker Street; A501 Marylebone Road	51°31′20″N 0°09′27″W	
The Baker's Arms	Crossroads	Leyton, LB Waltham Forest	A104 Lea Bridge Road; A112 Hoe Street; A112 High Road	51°34′31″N 0°00′47″W	Named after the pub sited on the crossroads.
Balcombe Road Junction	Grade Separated Dumbbell Interchange	Crawley, West Sussex	M23 J10a; B2036 Balcombe Road	TQ300355	
Baldersby Gate Interchange	Dumbbell Interchange	Baldersby, North Yorkshire	A1(M) Leeming Lane; A61; A6055	SE355763	
Balloon Corner	Crossroads	Welham Green, Hertfordshire	Dellsome Lane; Parsonage Lane; Huggins Lane	TL229056	Named after the first stop on Vincenzo Lunardi's 1784 balloon flight from Moorfields to Standon Green End
Bancroft Roundabout	Roundabout	Bancroft, Milton Keynes	H3 (A422) Monks Way; V6 Grafton Street	52°03′14″N 0°47′09″W	
Bank junction	Crossroads	City of London	Queen Victoria Street; Poultry; Cornhill; Walbrook; Lombard Street; Princes Street; Threadneedle Street; Mansion House Street	51°30′48″N 0°05′21″W	The junction is where many roads converge in the centre of the City of London at the Bank of England
Bankfield Roundabout	Roundabout	Central Milton Keynes	Avebury Boulevard; Marlborough Gate	52°02′44″N 0°44′29″W	
Bankfield Roundabout	Roundabout	Ayr, South Ayrshire	A77; A713; A713 Dalmellington Road	NS355193	
Bankhead	Roundabout	Glenrothes, Fife	A92; B921; unclass.	NT288994	
Bankhead Interchange	Fork Interchange	Bankhead, Falkirk	M80 J5; M876	NS805805	
Bardills Island	Roundabout with Inner Slip Road	Stapleford, Nottinghamshire	A52; B6003 Toton Lane; Bardills Garden Centre entrance	SK495361	In the centre of the roundabout, there is an inner slip road that links any traffic from the A52 (Derby) to the B6003 (Toton/Long Eaton), to cut out the congestion of the A52 (Nottingham) junction.
Barlborough Links	Roundabout	Barlborough, Derbyshire	A616 Oxcr. Way; High Hazels Road; Slayley View Road; Midland Way	53°16′57″N 1°17′05″W	
Barley Cross	Roundabout	Wick St. Lawrence, North Somerset	Barley Cross	51°22′31.37″N 2°54′52.10″W	
Barley Mow Roundabout	Roundabout	Brackley, Northamptonshire	A43; A421; B4031	51°59′48″N 1°09′39″W	
Barnes Meadow Interchange	Roundabout with flyover	Northampton, Northamptonshire	A45 Nene Valley Way; A428 Bedford Road; A5095 Rushmere Road	SP772597	Named on road signage
Barnetby Top	Roundabout Interchange	Barnetby le Wold, Lincolnshire	M180 J5; A15; A18; unclass.	TA051111	
Barnhill Junction	Grade Separated Interchange of non standard design	Perth, Perth and Kinross	M90 J11; A85 Dundee Road; A90	NO133221	The M90 spur to the Craigend Interchange was formerly designated M85
Barnsdale Bar		Barnsdale, South Yorkshire	A1 Great North Road; A639 Doncaster Road; Wrangbrook Lane; Woodfield Road	53°37′02″N 1°13′48″W	
Barnstaple Cross	Staggered	West Sandford, Crediton, Devon	A377; unclass. Higher Road; unclass., to Raddon Down Cross	50.7993°N 3.6992°W	Named on the road signs at both junctions
Barton Turn		Barton-under-Needwood, Staffordshire	A38 Lichfield Road; B5016 Station Road	52°45′42″N 1°42′08″W	
Bassett's Pole		Sutton Coldfield, West Midlands	A38; A453; A446	52°35′27″N 1°47′02″W	
Bath Bridge Roundabout		Bristol	A4 Temple Gate; A4 Bath Road; A370 Clarence Road; A370 York Road; Cattle Market Road	51°26′50″N 2°34′55″W	
Batts Bridge Roundabout	Roundabout	Maresfield, East Sussex	A22; A272; Batts Bridge Road	TQ549238	
Baynards Green Roundabout		Baynards Green, Oxfordshire	A43; B4100 (formerly A41)	51°57′30″N 1°12′13″W	
Beacon Cross	Crossroads	St Ewe, Cornwall	unclass.; unclass.; paths	SW985458	
Beacon Road Roundabout		Heathrow, LB Hillingdon	Southern Perimeter Road; Beacon Road	51°27′24″N 0°27′17″W	
Beacon Roundabout	Roundabout	Bletchley, Milton Keynes	Watling Street; unclass.	52°00′07″N 0°43′27″W	
Bean Interchange	Roundabout Interchange	Bean, Kent	A2 Dartford Bypass; B255 Bean Lane	51°25′52″N 0°16′51″E	
Beare Green Roundabout	Roundabout	Beare Green, Surrey	A24; A29 Bognor Road; Horsham Road; Newdigate Road	TQ177428	
Bearwood: aka King's Head	Crossroads	Birmingham	A456 Hagley Road; A4030 Bearwood Road; A4040 Lordswood Road	SP022860	Junction located just south of Bearwood district
Beaverbrook Roundabout		Leatherhead, Surrey	A24 By-Pass Road; B2033 Reigate Road	51°17′12″N 0°18′42″W	Named for Max Aitken, 1st Baron Beaverbrook who lived nearby at Cherkley Court
Beckton Alps	Roundabout Interchange	Beckton, LB Newham	A13 Newham Way; A117	TQ429821	
Bedford Park Corner	Crossroads	Bedford Park, London	B491 The Avenue; B491 Turnham Green Terrace; B409 Bath Road; B409 South Parade	TQ212789	
Beddingham Roundabout	Roundabout	Beddingham, East Sussex	A27/A26 Ranscombe Hill; A27 Eastbourne Road; A26 Newhaven Road	TQ 44593 08052	Named on the road signs
Bedminster Bridge		Bristol	A38; A370 Clarence Road; A370 York Road; A370 Coronation Road; Commercial Road	51°26′45″N 2°35′30″W	A roundabout incorporating the Old and New Bedminster Bridges over the New Cut of the River Avon - Chris McKenna
Beech Hill Cross	T junction	Morchard Bishop, Mid Devon	unclass. roads to: Morchard Bishop; Three Hammers; Black Dog and Witheridge	50.8639°N 3.7355°W	Named on fingerpost at junction
Beech Lanes Cross: aka Warley Odeon	Crossroads	Warley, Sandwell	A456 Hagley Road West; A4123 Wolverhampton Road; A4123 Wolverhampton Road South	SP011853	Warley Odeon was the name of the cinema (later a bingo hall) that stood at the site, where the office block now is.
Beechwood Cross	Crossroads	Sparkwell, Devon	Ledgate Lane; unclass.	SX577574	
Beer Door	Crossroads	Beer, Somerset	A372 Beer Wall; Beer Drove	ST401313	
Beggar's Hill		Ewell, Surrey	A240 Kingston Road; A240 Ewell Bypass; Park Avenue West; Kingston Road	51°21′29″N 0°15′0″W	
Belfry Roundabout	Roundabout	Redhill, Surrey	A23 Brighton Road; A25 High Street; A23 Marketfield Way	TQ279503	Named on road signage
Belgrave Square		City of Westminster	B310; B319	51°29′57″N 0°09′13″W	
The Bell	Crossroads	Walthamstow, LB Waltham Forest	A503 Forest Road; A112 Hoe Street; A112 Chingford Road	51°35′25″N 0°01′03″W	Named after the pub on the junction
The Bell Roundabout	Grade Separated Dumbbell Interchange	London Colney, Hertfordshire	M25 J22; A1081 London Colney By-pass (formerly A6); B556 Bell Lane; Coursers Road; Barnet Road	51°43′03″N 0°16′42″W	
Bellfield Interchange		Kilmarnock, East Ayrshire	A77; A71 Riccarton Road; A735 Queens Drive; A76	55°35′50″N 4°28′34″W	
Bellman's Cross	Crossroads	Henstridge, Somerset	A30 Blazeland's Hill; Park Lane; unclass.	ST732207	
Belvedere Roundabout		Central Milton Keynes	H5 (A509) Portway; V8 (B4034) Marlborough Street	52°02′57″N 0°45′05″W	
Berkeley Roundabout	Roundabout	Scunthorpe, Lincolnshire	A18 Doncaster Road; Scotter Road; A18 Kingsway; Doncaster Road	SE872122	
Berwick Roundabout	Roundabout	Berwick, East Sussex	A27 Lewes Road; Station Road; Alfriston Road	TQ 52408 05228	
Berrygrove	Roundabout Interchange	Watford, Hertfordshire	M1 J5; A41 Otterspool Road; A4008 Stephenson Way	51°40′17″N 0°22′11″W	
Bewbush Manor Roundabout		Crawley, West Sussex	A264; A2220	51°05′52″N 0°13′42″W	
Bignell's Corner: aka South Mimms	Roundabout Interchange	South Mimms, Hertfordshire	M25 J23; A1(M) J1; A1; A1081 (formerly A6)	51°41′12″N 0°13′47″W	Also known as South Mimms, because of the service area on the junction.
Bilston Road Island		Wolverhampton, West Midlands	A4150 Ring Road; Bilston Street; A41 Bilston Road; A454 Middle Cross	52°35′01″N 2°07′17″W	Midland Metro light railway runs through centre of island using signal controlled level crossings.
Birchanger Green Roundabout	Roundabout Interchange with inner slip road	Birchanger, Essex	M11 J8; A120 Bishop's Stortford Bypass; A120 Thremhall Avenue; Dunmow Road (formerly A120)	TL515215	Named after nearby village of Birchanger Green
Birchley Island	Roundabout	Oldbury, West Midlands	A4123 Wolverhampton Road; A4034 Birchfield Lane; A4034 Churchbridge; Spur to M5 J2	SO986884	
Birchy Cross	Crossroads	Wood End, Stratford-on-Avon, Warwickshire	B4101 Broad Lane; Tom Hill; Tithe Lane	SP119719	
Black Cat roundabout	Roundabout	Bedfordshire	A1 Great North Road; A421; Bedford Road (formerly A421)	52°11′06″N 0°18′19″W	
Black Cross	Crossroads	near Indian Queens, Cornwall	Parka Road (formerly A39); unclass.	SW910607	
Black Down Roundabout	Roundabout	Maresfield, East Sussex	A22; A26	TQ468230	
Black Horse	Crossroads	LB Richmond Upon Thames	A305 Sheen Road; B353 Manor Road; B353 Queens Road	51°27′42″N 0°17′18″W	
The Black Prince Interchange		Bexley, LB Bexley	A2 East Rochester Road; A220 Gravel Hill; A223 Bourne Road	51°26′51″N 0°09′17″E	
Blackbrook Roundabout		Taunton, Somerset	M5 J25; A358	51°01′04″N 3°03′43″W	
Blackhorse Road	Crossroads	Walthamstow, LB Waltham Forest	A503 Forest Road; A1006 Blackhorse Road; B179 Blackhorse Lane	51°35′14″N 0°02′25″W	
Blacklands Cross	Crossroads	Sparkwell, Devon	unclass.; unclass.	SX582580	
Blacow Bridge		Bamber Bridge, Lancashire	M6 J30; M61	53°44′11″N 2°38′56″W	
Blakelands		Blakelands, Milton Keynes	H3 (A422) Monks Way; V10 Brickhill Street	52°04′01″N 0°44′19″W	
Bleak Hill Roundabout		Bleak Hill, Milton Keynes	H6 (A421) Standing Way; V6 Grafton Street	52°01′01″N 0°44′41″W	
Bletcham Roundabout		Fenny Lock, Milton Keynes	A5 (N/B); H10 Bletcham Way	52°00′27″N 0°42′48″W	See Caldecott Roundabout
Blind Lane Interchange		Chester-le-Street, County Durham	A1(M) J63; A167 Picktree Lane; A183 Blind Lane; A183 Chester Road; Picktree Lane	54°51′59″N 1°33′53″W	
Blochairn Interchange		Glasgow	M8 J14; unclass.	55°52′02″N 4°12′57″W	
Blue Star Roundabout	Roundabout	Angmering, West Sussex	Station Road; A259 Roundstone By-Pass; B2140 Station Road; A259 New Road	TQ065031	
Blyth Roundabout	Grade Separated Dumbbell Interchange	Blyth, Nottinghamshire	A1; A614 Bawtry Road; B6045 Bawtry Road	SK624883	
Blyth Bridge Roundabout	Roundabout	Blyth Bridge, Staffordshire	A50; A521	SJ964405	
Bockhampton Cross	Crossroads	Stinsford, Dorset	Bockhampton Lane; Hollow Hill; Islington Road	SY722914	
The Body Shop Roundabout	Roundabout	Littlehampton, West Sussex	Norway Lane; A259; B2187 Worthing Road; B2187 Horsham Road; A259 Worthing Road	TQ037033	Named after The Body Shop Headquarters, located adjacent to the Roundabout.
Bognor Road Roundabout	Roundabout	Chichester, West Sussex	A27 Chichester Bypass; Bognor Road; A27 Chichester Bypass; A259 Bognor Road; Vinnetrow Road	SU 87788 04143	
Bohemia Corner	Crossroads	Rookley, Isle of Wight	A3020 Main Road; Chequers Inn Road; Merstone Lane	SZ519835	
Bokenna Cross	Crossroads	Dobwalls, Cornwall	unclass.; unclass.	SX212662	
Bolney Crossways	Grade Separated Dumbbell Interchange	Bolney, West Sussex	A23; A272	TQ267224	
The Boot and Shoe		Micklefield, West Yorkshire	A1; A63 Selby Road	53°46′42″N 1°18′36″W	
Bordesley Circus	Roundabout	Bordesley, Birmingham	A4540 Bordesley Middleway; A4540 Watery Lane Middleway; A45 Small Heath Highway; B4128 Coventry Road	SP082872	Main junction for the A4540 towards Heartlands Hospital
Boshill Cross		Colyford, Devon	A358; A3052; B3172	50.729°N 3.045°W	
Boship Roundabout		Hailsham, East Sussex	A22; A267 New North Street; A271 Horsebridge	TQ571111	
Boskenna Cross	Crossroads	Boskenna, Cornwall	B3315; Rectory Road	SW426243	
Bosley Crossroads		Bosley, Cheshire	A54 roadA54; A523	53°11′50″N 2°07′51″W	
Botley Interchange		Botley, Oxfordshire	A34; A420	51°45′22″N 1°17′48″W	
Bottle Dump Roundabout	Roundabout	Tattenhoe Park, Milton Keynes	H8 (A421) Standing Way; unclass.	51°59′12″N 0°48′14″W	Named after the recycling centre at the roundabout
Bow Interchange	Roundabout Interchange	Bow, LB Tower Hamlets	A12 East Cross Route (formerly A102); A11 Mile End Road; A118 High Street (Stratford) (former A11)	51°31′47″N 0°00′50″W	
Bowburn Interchange		Bowburn, County Durham	A1(M) J61; A688; A177 Durham Road; B6291	54°43′49″N 1°31′12″W	
Bowd Corner		Newton Poppleford, Devon	A3052 Four Elms Hill; unclass.	50.6987°N 3.2747°W	
Bowd Cross		Bowd, Sidmouth, Devon	A3052; B3176 to Sidmouth; unclass. to Tipton St John (was B3176)	50.7024°N 3.2654°W	
The Bowl Roundabout		Knowlhill, Milton Keynes	H7 Chaffron Way; V4 Watling Street	52°01′09″N 0°46′05″W	Named after the National Bowl at Milton Keynes
Bowshaw Roundabout		Greenhill, South Yorkshire	A61 Chesterfield Road South; A61 Unstone Dronfield By-pass; B6057 Jordanthorpe Parkway; B6057 Sheffield Road	53°19′01″N 1°28′32″W	
Bowtrees Roundabout		Airth, Falkirk	M876 J3; A876 South Approach Road; A905	NS905859	
Box's Corner	T junction	Chawleigh, Mid Devon	B3042; unclass., dead end	50.8909°N 3.8243°W	
Boxgrove Roundabout: aka Tangmere Roundabout	Roundabout	Tangmere, Boxgrove, West Sussex	A27 Arundel Road; The Street, (Boxgrove); A27 Arundel Road; Meadow Way, (Tangmere)	SU 90751 06988	
Boxgrove Roundabout	Roundabout	Guildford, Surrey	A25 Boxgrove Road; A25 Parkway; A3100 London Road	TQ010510	
Bradbury Interchange		Bradbury, County Durham	A1(M) J60; A689	54°39′07″N 1°30′44″W	
Bradville Roundabout		Bradville, Milton Keynes	H2 Millers Way; V6 Grafton Street	52°03′31″N 0°47′21″W	
Brambling Fields	Non standard grade separated design	Malton, North Yorkshire	A64; B1248 Scarborough Road	SE819726	
Braehead	Fork Interchange	Renfrew	M8 J25a; unclass.	NS523662	webcam
Bramham Crossroads		Bramham, West Yorkshire	A1(M) J45; A64; unclass. (formerly A1)	53°51′22″N 1°20′42″W	
Bramley Roundabout		Bramley, South Yorkshire	M18 J1; A631 Bawtry Road	53°25′25″N 1°15′04″W	
Brampton Hut	Roundabout Interchange	Brampton, Huntingdonshire	A1; A14	52°19′57″N 0°14′53″W	
Brandis Corner	T junction	Bradford, Devon	A3072; unclass., to Bradford and Cookbury	50.8131°N 4.2573°W	Named on road sign at junction
Brandise Corner	T junction	Colebrooke, Devon	unclass. roads to: Copplestone N; Crediton E; Yeoford W	50.7812°N 3.7184°W	Named on fingerpost
Branscombe Cross	Staggered	Salcombe Regis, Devon	A3052; unclass. Beachtree Lane; unclass., to Branscombe	50.711°N 3.172°W	Named on road signs at both junctions
Branston Interchange: aka Burton South		Branston, Staffordshire	A38; A5121	52°47′21″N 1°40′31″W	
Braunstone Crossroads		Braunstone, Leicestershire	A47; B5380; Braunstone Lane	52°37′37″N 1°12′04″W	
Breakspears	Trumpet	Hemel Hempstead, Hertfordshire	M1 J8; A414 (formerly A4147)	51°45′23″N 0°25′0″W	
Breezehurst Roundabout		Crawley, West Sussex	A2220 Horsham Road; Breezehurst Drive; Pelham Drive	51°06′02″N 0°12′51″W	
Brenley Corner	Roundabout Interchange	Faversham, Kent	M2 J7; A2; A299; Brenley Lane; Homestall Lane	51°18′08″N 0°55′37″E	
Brent Cross Interchange	Roundabout Interchange	Brent Cross, LB Barnet	A41 Hendon Way; A406 North Circular Road	51°34′36″N 0°13′07″W	
Brent Knoll / East Brent Roundabout		Brent Knoll, Somerset	A38 Bristol Road; A370 Bridgwater Road	51°15′27″N 2°56′0″W	Named after the nearby Fort and Hill
Brettargh Holt	Roundabout Interchange	Kendal, Cumbria	A590; A591; unclassified lane	SD504870	
Bricklayers Arms	Roundabout Interchange with flyover	Southwark, LB Southwark	A2 Great Dover Street; A2 Old Kent Road; A201 New Kent Road; A100 Tower Bridge Road	51°29′40″N 0°05′09″W	Named after a former coaching inn on the site.
Bridge Road Roundabout	Roundabout	Littlehampton, West Sussex	A259 Bridge Road; Unclassified access road; A259; Broad Piece; B2187 Bridge Road	TQ 01654 02596	
Bridge of Earn	Diamond Interchange	Bridge of Earn, Perthshire	M90 J9; A912	NO137176	
Bridgewood Roundabout	Roundabout Interchange	Chatham, Kent	A229 Maidstone Road; B2097 Rochester Road; Walderslade Woods	TQ746633	
Briggate Lodge Roundabout	Roundabout	Brigg, Lincolnshire	A18 Broughton Lane; A18 spur to M180 J4; Ermine Street	SE957067	
Brinklow Roundabout		Brinklow, Milton Keynes	H8 (A421) Standing Way; V11 (A4146) Tongwell Street	52°02′03″N 0°41′31″W	
Britannia Junction	Crossroads	Camden Town, LB Camden	A400; A502; A503; A4200; A4201	51°32′21″N 0°08′34″W	
Broadfield Roundabout		Crawley, West Sussex	A2220 Horsham Road; Bewbush Drive	51°06′12″N 0°12′27″W	Gives access to Broadfield neighbourhood
Broadway Roundabout		Bournemouth, Dorset	A3060 Castle Lane West; B3063 Charmister Road; Broadway Lane	50.7544°N 1.8576°W	
Broad Street Junction		Wolverhampton, West Midlands	A4150 Ring Road; Broad Street; A4124 Broad Street	52°35′18″N 2°07′22″W	
Brockeridge Common		Twyning, Gloucestershire	M50 J1; A38	52°02′07″N 2°09′51″W	
Bromley Corner	Crossroads	Lawford, Essex	A137 Wignall Street (formerly A12); Bromley Road	TM093310	
Brook Street Interchange	Roundabout Interchange	Brentwood, Essex	M25 J28; A12 Colchester Road; A1023 Brook Street (former A12)	51°36′31″N 0°15′45″E	
Broughton Interchange	Grade Separated Fork	Preston, Lancashire	M6 J32; M55	SD541348	
Broughton Roundabout	Roundabout Interchange	Preston, Lancashire	M55 J1; A6 Garstang Road	SD529341	
Browns Corner		Winscombe, North Somerset	A371 Woodborough Road; Sandford Road; Hillyfields Way	51°18′53″N 2°49′59″W	
Brown's Corner		Wyddial, Hertfordshire	unclass.; bridleway	TL369312	
Brown's Green	Crossroads	Hockley Heath, West Midlands	B4101 Broad Lane; B4101 Pound House Lane; Umberslade Road	SP132718	
Browns Wood Roundabout: aka Browns Park		Browns Wood, Milton Keynes	H10 (A4146) Bletcham Way; V11 (A4146) Tongwell Street	52°01′07″N 0°41′04″W	
Broxden Junction	Roundabout	Perth, Scotland	M90; A9; A93	NO083228	
Brunel Roundabout		Bletchley, Milton Keynes	V7 (B4034) Saxon Street; B4034 Buckingham Road; Duncombe Street	51°59′39″N 0°44′05″W	
Buck Barn Crossroads		Horsham, West Sussex	A24 Worthing Road; A272 Cowfold Road	50°59′30″N 0°20′24″W	
Budletts Roundabout	Roundabout	Maresfield, East Sussex	A26; A272; London Road	TQ470235	
Bullington Cross		Bullington, Hampshire	A303; A34	51°10′37″N 1°20′21″W	
Bulls Bridge Roundabout	Roundabout	Cranford, LB Hounslow	A312 The Parkway; A437 North Hyde Road; Hayes Road	51°29′53″N 0°24′33″W	
Burford Bridge Roundabout	Roundabout	Westhumble, Surrey	A24 London Road; A24 Mickleham Bypass; B2209 Old London Road	TQ171519	
Burgh Heath	Crossroads	Burgh Heath, Surrey	A240 Reigate Road; A217 Brighton Road	TQ242578	
Burntcommon	Southbound on-slip only	Buntcommon, Surrey	A3 Ripley By-pass; A247 Clandon Road; Tithebarns Lane	TQ040544	
Burnt Mill Corner	Crossroads	Gilston, Hertfordshire	Eastwick Road (formerly A414); Burntmill Lane	51°47′08″N 0°05′46″E	
Burnt Tree Junction		Dudley, West Midlands	A461; A4123 New Burmingham Road; A4033 Tividale Road	52°30′49″N 2°03′47″W	Formerly all the roads met at a large roundabout. The A4033 now meets the A4123 at a separate part of the junction.
Burpham Interchange	Northbound on-slip only	Burpham, Surrey	A3; A3100; Clay Lane	TQ013527	
Burridge Moor Cross	T junction	Chawleigh, Mid Devon	B3042; unclass., to Cheldon	50.8905°N 3.7833°W	Named on fingerpost
Burtree Interchange		Darlington, County Durham	A1(M) J58; A68	54°33′24″N 1°35′37″W	
Bury Court		Gloucestershire	M50 J2; A417	51°59′46″N 2°21′35″W	
Bury Hill Roundabout: see Whiteways Lodge Roundabout
Busch Corner		LB Hounslow	A310 Twickenham Road; A315 London Road; B454 Spur Road	51°28′42″N 0°19′24″W	
The Bustard	Crossroads	Salisbury Plain, Wiltshire	unclass.	SU092461	Named after the inn at the junction, itself named after the great bustard, a bird which was once common on Salisbury Plain.
Butler's Cross	Crossroads	Babingley, Norfolk	A149 Lynn Road; B1439; unclass.	TF676264	
Butney Corner	Crossroads	near Kehelland, Cornwall	unclass.; unclass.	SW614425	
Butterley Junction		Butterley, Ripley, Derbyshire	B6179 Butterley Row (Butterley Hill); B6179 Derby Road; Butterley Lane		Situated between the Butterley Reservoir and Ironworks
Buttington Cross	Roundabout	Welshpool	A485; A483; Rhallt Lane	SJ242089	
Bylane End	Crossroads	near Trethew, Cornwall	B3251; B3252; unclass.	SX276598	
