= A41 road =

Road in England

A41

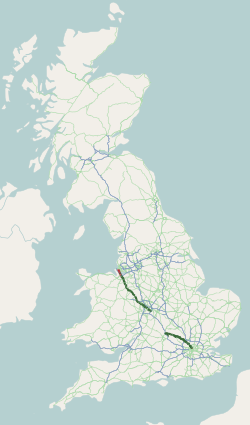

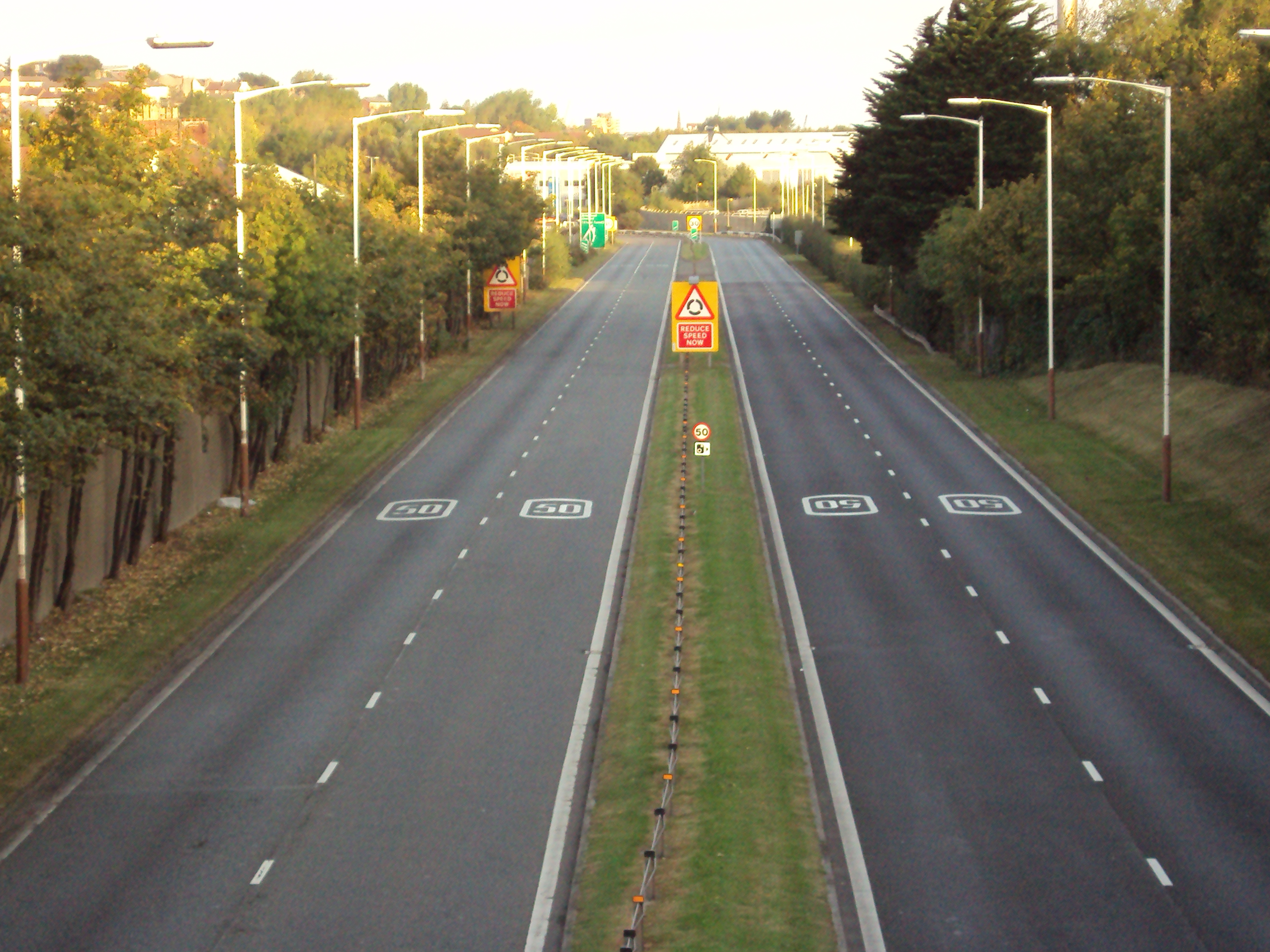
- Looking towards the northern end of the Rock Ferry bypass near Birkenhead

Route information
- Maintained by List: Birmingham City Council Buckinghamshire County Council Cheshire West and Chester Council Hertfordshire County Council National Highways Oxfordshire County Council Sandwell Metropolitan Borough Council Shropshire Council Solihull Metropolitan Borough Council Staffordshire County Council Telford and Wrekin Borough Council Transport for London Walsall Council Westminster City Council Wirral Metropolitan Borough Council Wolverhampton City Council
- Length: 155.2 mi (249.8 km)
- Existed: 1922–present

Major junctions
- Southeast end: London
- A1 in Barnet, London M1 near Elstree M25 near Abbots Langley M40 / A34 near Bicester M42 / A4141 near Solihull; M5 in West Bromwich M54 near Tong M53 near Hooton
- Northwest end: Birkenhead

Location
- Country: United Kingdom
- Counties: Greater London, Hertfordshire, Buckinghamshire, Oxfordshire, West Midlands, Staffordshire, Shropshire, Cheshire, Merseyside
- Primary destinations: London; West End; Brent Cross; Watford; Hemel Hempstead; Aylesbury; Solihull; Birmingham; West Bromwich; Wolverhampton; Whitchurch; Chester; Ellesmere Port; Birkenhead

Road network
- Roads in the United Kingdom; Motorways; A and B road zones

The A41 is a trunk road between London and Birkenhead, England. Now in parts replaced by motorways, it passes through or near Watford, Kings Langley, Hemel Hempstead, Aylesbury, Bicester, Solihull, Birmingham, West Bromwich, Wolverhampton, Newport, Whitchurch, Chester and Ellesmere Port.

With the opening of the M40 extension in 1990 from junction 8, much of the route was downgraded. The sections between Bicester and the M42 near Solihull in the Midlands have been re-classified B4100, A4177 and A4141.

== Route ==
=== London to Kings Langley ===
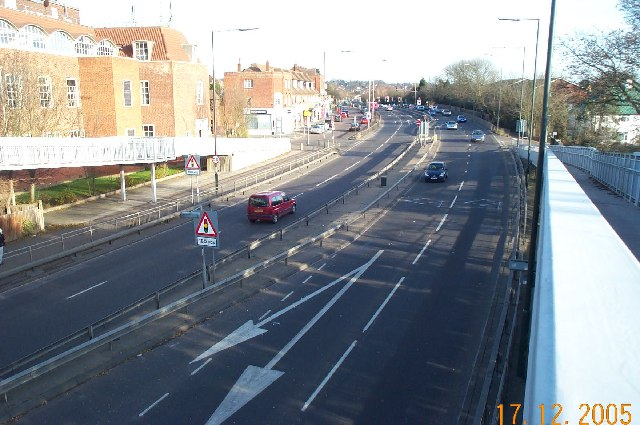
The A41 in Edgware

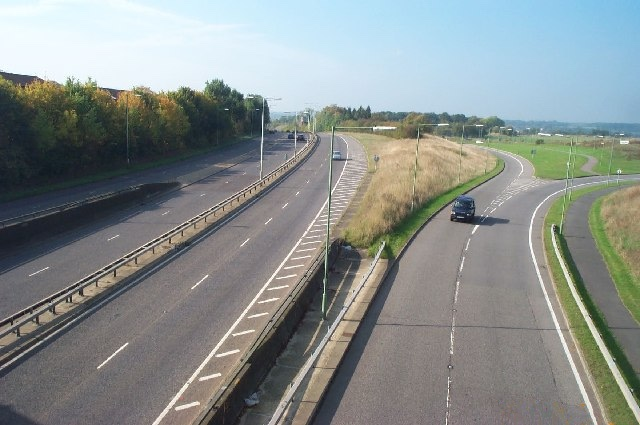
A41 north of Watford to the east of junction 19 of the M25

The route begins at Marble Arch from its junction on the A40 in central London with Portman Street/Gloucester Place (northbound) and Baker Street/Orchard Street (southbound). Through Swiss Cottage, the A41 runs along Finchley Road, before turning onto Hendon Way and becoming a dual carriageway. There is a grade separated junction with the North Circular Road at Brent Cross. The road passes through Hendon and after the junction with the A5150 (close to the Metropolitan Police's police college and the Royal Air Force Museum London), the A41 overlaps with the A1 through Mill Hill, between Fiveways Corner and the Apex Corner roundabout, with this section known as Watford Way. Immediately after Apex Corner the road crosses the M1, continuing as Edgware Way towards Elstree, where it links to the M1 at Junction 4, before meeting the A5 at a roundabout (where the A5 becomes the A5183). The A41 continues alongside the M1 into Hertfordshire. This section is known as Elton Way, as far as the roundabout with the B462.

Running parallel to the M1, it intersects with junction 5 (Berrygrove Interchange). The road continues north, passing over the River Colne, to the east of Watford, crossing the A412 near Garston at "the Dome roundabout". After passing under the junction with the A405, the A41 turns towards the west. At a roundabout, with the A411 to Watford to the south, and the M25 spur straight ahead to join the M25 westbound at junction 19, the A41 continues north through Hunton Bridge crossing the River Gade and the Grand Union Canal to meet the M25 at junction 20. The old route through Kings Langley is now classified A4251. It used to follow the route of the Roman road, Akeman Street, between Berkhamsted and Bicester. The London to Aylesbury section was a similar route to the Sparrows Herne Turnpike Road.

=== Kings Langley to Tring ===
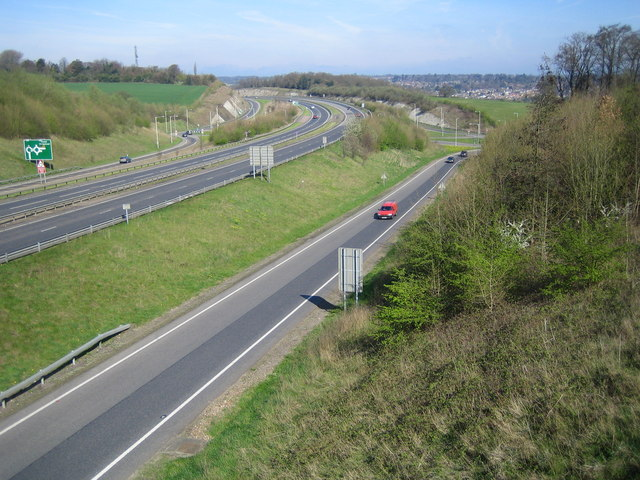
A41 west of Hemel Hempstead at its junction with the A414

North of the M25, the road is a near motorway standard "A" road with all junctions grade-separated via underpasses or flyovers, but curves and gradients a little steeper. There are no hard shoulders but frequent lay-bys. It climbs through the Chiltern Hills then descends into the valley of the River Bulbourne crossing water meadows just outside Hemel Hempstead at Boxmoor. There are grade-separated junctions with the A414, A4251 (the earlier route of the A41) and A416. The route returns to open country north of here, passing west of Berkhamsted. It passes the National Film Archive. Before Tring, near Wigginton, it crosses the Icknield Way Path and Chiltern Way. An arched footbridge spans the road just near the summit before it passes just east of Tring (for the Ridgeway footpath) and descends the Chiltern scarp into the Vale of Aylesbury.

The Tring bypass was built in 1973 as the first section of the Watford-Aylesbury A41(M) motorway. On 6 July 1987, this section was downgraded to A41. The Tring bypass ends with the junction with the B4635, B4009 (the former route through Aston Clinton) and B488.

The A41 from junction 20 of the M25 to the Tring bypass was built in the early 1990s and opened in two sections: the 7 miles (11 km) £23.9 million Berkhamsted bypass opened September 1993 and the 5 miles (8.0 km) £32.7 million Kings Langley bypass opened August 1993.

=== Tring to Bicester ===
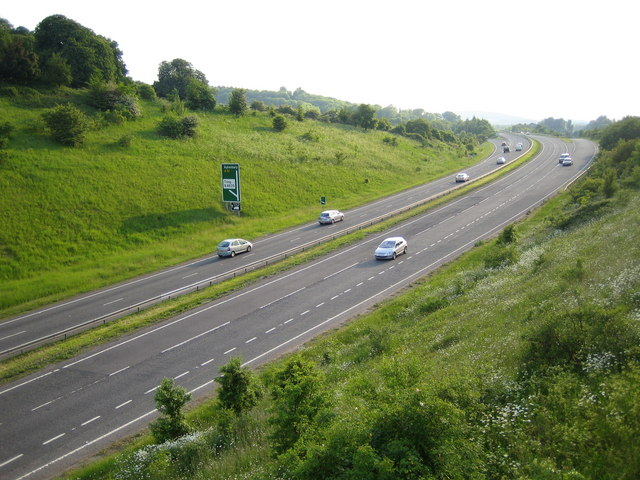
Former southern terminus of the Tring bypass

On 3 October 2003, the dual carriageway section was extended to the 3-mile (4.8 km) £25m Aston Clinton Bypass, which was originally intended to be built at the same time as the two sections further south. It enters Buckinghamshire and the district of Aylesbury Vale. It crosses the Grand Union Canal, and there is a junction with the B489, and finishes at a roundabout, becoming Aston Clinton Road. The road goes straight through Aylesbury, which is a bottleneck. It meets the A4157 at a junction as Tring Road, and the next roundabout is near Aylesbury Grammar School and a Tesco. It meets the A418 ring-road and becomes Exchange Street, then meets the A413 from Wendover at a roundabout and becomes Friarage Road, passing close to a Morrisons and the railway station. The A418 turns to the left and A41 continues straight ahead to become Gatehouse Road, then at the next roundabout, it leaves to left as Bicester Road near the Applegreen Aylesbury Service Station. After four roundabouts, it crosses the River Thame. It then meets a roundabout with access for the new Berryfields development as well as Aylesbury Vale Parkway before passing under a railway line, then through Waddesdon, then passes close to Westcott near the former airfield of RAF Westcott. At Kingswood, it passes the Crooked Billet (now the "Akeman Inn") and Plough and Anchor (now an Italian restaurant) pubs. It enters Oxfordshire and the district of Cherwell, and at Blackthorn it crosses the River Ray and meets a low bridge which was originally a 14-foot (4.3 m) limit but due to bridge strikes, the road was lowered and the bridge now has a 15-foot (4.6 m) limit.

=== Bicester to Solihull ===
The £5.7m 2-mile (3.2 km) first stage of the Bicester bypass opened in November 1990, with the 2-mile (3.2 km) £3.9m second stage (part of the A421 section to Wendlebury) opened in May 1993, and has many roundabouts. Since 1993, the road now heads south-west where it officially becomes part of the M40 at junction 9, meeting with the A34 (which also overlaps the M40 to Birmingham – to draw traffic off the previous routes). The former route went through Warwick. From here to the M42, the original route is now mainly designated as the B4100 (multiplexing at points with the current A361 and A422 through Banbury, plus the A452 and A425 approaching and through Warwick) followed by the A4177 and A4141, the latter two both excellent wide roads. At junction 5 of the M42, the A41 follows its old course. Further north, the road bypasses Solihull and goes through the city centres of Birmingham and Wolverhampton. This renumbering took place in 1991. The A4141 and B4100 are new designations, while the A4177 is an extension of an existing route.

=== Solihull to Wolverhampton ===
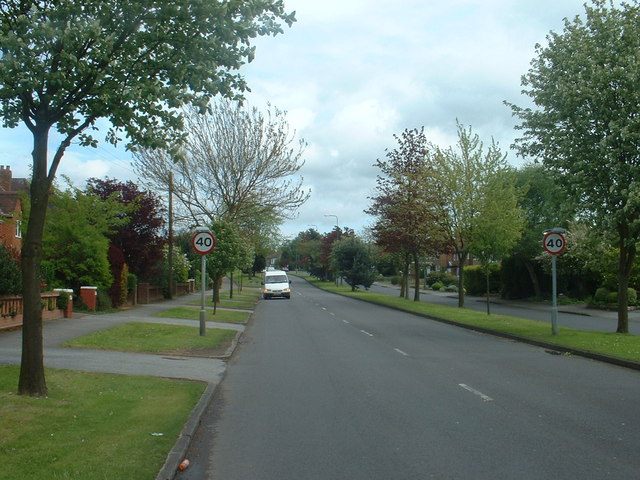
The A41 bypass of Solihull

The road manifests from the junction which opened in November 1976 with the A4141 and M42 near Berry Hall Farm, and crosses the River Blythe and bypasses Solihull. The former route through Solihull is now the B4025 and B425, which passes Solihull School. The A41 has a staggered junction with the B4102 (for Solihull and Catherine-de-Barnes) near the BUPA Parkway Hospital. At Lode Heath, there is crossroads with the B425 (for Solihull Hospital) where the road is the Seven Star Road. The A41 resumes the old route at another junction with the B425, becoming Warwick Road, which is the name of the route all the way into Birmingham. At Worlds End there is the Shell Solihull garage on the left. Next is Ulverley Green and it passes the BP Mereside garage on the right and passes under the Chiltern Main Line (for Leamington) near Olton station, Olton Library and Olton Reservoir. At the junction with the B4514, there is a Tesco petrol station and the road enters the city of Birmingham. The B4514 leads onto Olton Boulevard and can be used to bypass Acocks Green, although there is one section to be completed near Sparkhill. It passes Archbishop Ilsley Catholic School at Acocks Green, then meets the B4146 and B4217 at a roundabout near a Sainsburys. It meets the A4040 ring road at a staggered junction and crosses the Birmingham -Stratford Line near Tyseley station and the Tyseley Locomotive Works. At Sparkhill, it crosses the River Cole and meets the B4145 at a roundabout near Golden Hillock School. At Sparkbrook, it meets the A34 Stratford Road and there is a crossroads with the A4540 and B4126. The two main routes overlap around central Birmingham and meet The Middleway (A4540) inner ring road. The former route of the A41 through inner Birmingham is now the B4100 heading past the National Express Birmingham coach station, and passes near St Chad's RC Cathedral. The A41 previously resumed at Constitution Hill near Snow Hill train station but following downgrading of much of the former Inner Ring Road, resumes in Hockley where it meets the northern section of the A4540. (The section from the A4540 to city centre is another part of the B4100). There is a staggered junction with the A4040 as the road passes through Handsworth (at this point known as Soho Road) which is a particular bottleneck with narrow lanes, on-street parking, bad drivers and several close-set junctions, often very badly congested. Just before The Hawthorns football stadium, home of West Bromwich Albion F.C., it leaves Birmingham and enters the borough of Sandwell. It meets the M5 at junction 1, where it also meets the A4252.

In 2004, there were plans to re-route the road between Birmingham & West Bromwich along the current A457 via Smethwick & up to the M5 at Junction 1 along the current A4252. These plans were scrapped soon after. It bypasses West Bromwich on a dual-carriageway called the Expressway, which opened in 1973. There is a grade separated roundabout with the A4031. The grade separated roundabout opened over 20 years after the Expressway, relieving what had been a major bottleneck. At the next roundabout, the A41 follows a new route with the original route (Old Meeting Street) being designated as the A4196.

The new route opened in 1995 and is called the Black Country New Road, and crosses the West Midlands Metro tram line near Guns Village. There is a roundabout with the B4149 at Swan Village. From the roundabout with the A461 (for Dudley) at Great Bridge, it overlaps the A461 (to Walsall), crosses the Tame Valley Canal, meets the A4037 at a roundabout and goes under the West Midlands Metro near Wednesbury Parkway tram stop. The A461 heads off to junction 9 of the M6 and Walsall. The A41 follows the old route from the next roundabout and enters the borough of Walsall. At the junction with the A4444 (the final phase of the Black Country New Road) it crosses the Walsall Canal.

There are junctions with the A4098 (where the road enters the borough of Wolverhampton) and B4163. The road goes straight through the middle of Bilston, where it meets the dual-carriageway A463 Black Country Route at a busy roundabout. Close by is the Bilston Central tram stop, near Morrisons. There is a junction with the B4484 (for the A454) near The Crescent tram stop. At Priestfield, it meets the B4162, and passes the City of Wolverhampton College Wellington Road Campus (Bilston) near Priestfield tram stop. From here, the West Midlands Metro runs down the centre of the road. There is a signalised junction with the A4126 (trams and buses use the nearside lane towards Wolverhampton) and the road passes under the Wolverhampton loop of the West Coast Main Line at Monmore Green, and crosses the Birmingham Canal. It overlaps the A4150 Wolverhampton Ring Road, then passes West Park Hospital and crosses the Staffordshire & Worcestershire Canal. It passes through Tettenhall, past Tettenhall College.

=== Wolverhampton to Newport ===
After leaving the borough of Wolverhampton, it crosses the River Penk, then runs into Staffordshire passing Perton, Codsall and the golf course at Wrottesley Hall. Next is a junction with the A464 (for Shifnal), and the road enters Shropshire. It crosses the Wolverhampton to Shrewsbury Line on the Albrighton bypass. The road passes close by the Royal Air Force Museum Midlands at Cosford. After junction 3 of the M54 motorway, the road passes through Tong. The road meets the A5 at a roundabout, which is on the border with Staffordshire. At Weston Heath, there is a junction with the B5314. At the junction of the B4379, the road enters Telford and Wrekin. The 5-mile (8.0 km) £6m Newport bypass opened in early 1985. The former route went through Chetwynd Aston. The A41 meets the A518 for Telford at a roundabout, followed by another roundabout with the A518 for travelling east, and then a roundabout with the A519 and the B5062.

=== Newport to Whitchurch ===
The road rejoins the old route and passes Chetwynd Park. The £1.5m Hinstock Bypass opened in late 1983. The day before the bypass opened for traffic, a Hinstock local named David Williams flew his Saab 91D Safir airplane under the Pixley Lane bridge in an unsanctioned stunt. The road then passes through Standford, Standford Bridge and over the River Meese. It passes High Heath, Shakeford, Crickmery which is near Wistanswick. Nearby is the former wartime fighter base RAF Ternhill, now an army base known as Clive Barracks. The road crosses the River Tern, meets the A53 at a roundabout at Ternhill. After Bletchley Manor, there is 3 miles (4.8 km) of dual carriageway. The road passes through Prees Higher Heath near a former airfield (RAF Tilstock), and meets the A49 at a roundabout near Tilstock. The 3-mile (4.8 km) £13.7m Whitchurch Bypass opened in July 1992, where the road meets the A49.

=== Whitchurch to Birkenhead ===
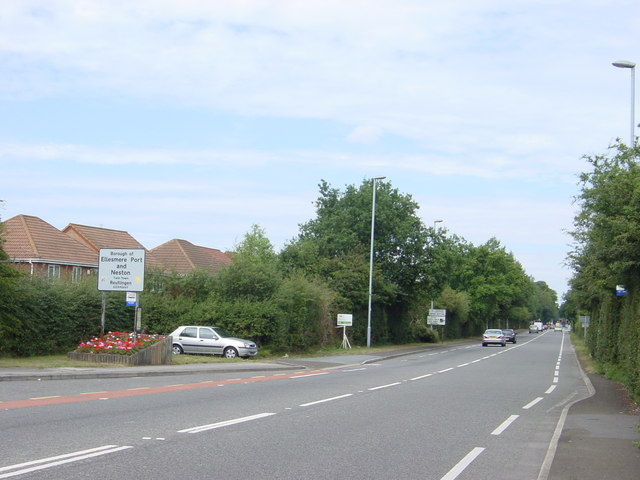
Looking north from Backford Cross roundabout towards Great Sutton

The final stretch of the road leaves Shropshire and heads north through Cheshire on a modern alignment bypassing the villages of Tushingham cum Grindley and No Mans Heath before reaching a nineteenth century bypass of the stagecoach road through Broxton. The road crosses the A534 at Broxton Roundabout before passing Beeston, Bolesworth and Peckforton Castles. The road bypasses Chester, before running through the suburbs of Ellesmere Port (where the road was downgraded for safety reasons in the early 1990s). It heads to junction 5 of the M53 motorway and the Merseyside county boundary at Hooton. From this junction it is named New Chester Road, passing through Eastham and Bromborough. At Port Sunlight the A41 diverts onto a dual-carriageway section bypassing New Ferry and Rock Ferry before rejoining New Chester Road at Tranmere Oil Terminal. After passing Green Lane railway station, a 2.3 miles (3.7 km) spur of the A41 separates at the southern approach to the Queensway Tunnel, which passes under the River Mersey and enters Liverpool to meet the start of the A59.

The road then passes a junction with the A554 near Hamilton Square railway station, terminating at the bus station at Woodside. The end of the road has views over the Mersey to Liverpool and transport links to Mersey Ferry services.

== Major junctions ==
=== First segment ===
County	Location	mi	km	Destinations	Notes
Greater London	Westminster	0.0	0.0	North Audley Street	Southern terminus; no access to A40
Greater London	Westminster	0.1	0.16	Wigmore Street (A5204)	No access from A41 north-west to A5204 east
Greater London	Westminster	0.6	0.97	A501 (Ring Road) to A40 / A4 – Paddington	No access from A41 south-east to A501 east; no information signed north-west
Greater London	Westminster	1.3	2.1	Prince Albert Road (A5205 east) – Camden Town	Camden Town signed south-east only; South-eastern terminus of A5205 concurrency
Greater London	Westminster	1.4	2.3	A5205 west (St. John's Wood Road) – Paddington, St Johns Wood	No access from A41 south-east to A5205 west; north-western terminus of A5205 concurrency
Greater London	Camden–Barnet borough boundary	4.0	6.4	A598 north (Finchley Road) – Finchley, Golders Green	Finchley signed north-west only; Southern terminus of A598
Greater London	Barnet	4.3	6.9	A407 (Cricklewood Lane) to A598 – Willesden, Cricklewood, Golders Green	To A598 and Golders Green signed southbound only
Greater London	Barnet	5.3– 5.7	8.5– 9.2	A406 (North Circular) to M1 / M11 / A10 / A40 – The North, Watford, Wood Green, Wembley	The North and Watford signed north-west only; To M11, A10, and A40 south-east only; grade-separated junction
Greater London	Barnet	6.5	10.5	A504 (Station Road / The Burroughs) – Colindale	Information signed south-east only
Greater London	Barnet	6.7	10.8	A5150 west – Colindale	Grade-separated junction; no south-east exit
Greater London	Barnet	7.6	12.2	A1 south to A406 east (North Circular) – Finchley, Central London	To A406 and Central London signed south-east only; south-east terminus of A1 concurrency
Greater London	Barnet	8.8	14.2	A5100 west (The Broadway) / Lawrence Street – Burnt Oak, Edgware	Edgware signed north-west only; eastern terminus of A5100
Greater London	Barnet	9.4	15.1	A1 north (Barnet Way) / A5109 (Selvage Lane) to M25 east – The North, Hatfield, Borehamwood, Edgware, Totteridge	North-west terminus of A1 concurrency
Greater London	Barnet	10.9	17.5	A410 west (Spur Road) to A5 – Harrow, Stanmore, Edgware	To A5 and Edgware signed south-east only; eastern terminus of A410
Greater London	Barnet	11.8	19.0	M1 north to M25 – The North, Lufton	Grade-separated junction; north-west exit and south-east entrance
Hertfordshire	Elstree	12.0	19.3	A5 south-east (Brockley Hill) / A5183 north-west (Elstree Hill South) – Edgware, Elstree	North-western terminus of A5; south-eastern terminus of A5183
Hertfordshire	Hertsmere	12.9	20.8	A411 (Elstree Road) to A409 – Harrow, Bushey, Barnet	Bushey signed north-west only, Barnet south-east only
Hertfordshire	Hertsmere	15.6– 16.0	25.1– 25.7	A4008 to M1 / M25 east – Watford, Bushey	Grade-separated junction; To M25 signed north-west only, Bushey south-east only
Hertfordshire	Watford	17.1	27.5	A412 (St Albans Road) to M1 / A405 – North Watford, Garston	To M1 signed north-west only
Hertfordshire	Watford	17.8– 18.5	28.6– 29.8	A405 east to M1 – The North, Abbots Langley, Leavesden, St Albans	Grade-separated junction; St Albans signed south-east only; western terminus of A405
Hertfordshire	Abbots Langley	18.7	30.1	M25 east to M40 / M4 – Heathrow Airport, Rickmansworth A411 south – Watford	Rickmansworth signed north-west only; western terminus of A411; M25 junction 19
Hertfordshire	Abbots Langley–Kings Langley boundary	20.0	32.2	M25 to M40 / M4 / M1 / M11 – Heathrow Airport, Stansted Airport A4251 north-west (Watford Road) – Kings Langley	South-eastern terminus of A4251; M25 junction 20
Hertfordshire	Abbots Langley–Kings Langley boundary	20.0	32.2	Begin freeway	
Hertfordshire	Dacorum	22.7– 23.3	36.5– 37.5	A414 east – Hemel Hempstead	Western terminus of A414
Hertfordshire	Dacorum	24.5– 24.6	39.4– 39.6	A4251 – Bourne End, Berkhamsted, Boxmoor	
Hertfordshire	Bovingdon	25.2– 25.5	40.6– 41.0	Bourne End Mills Industrial Estate	
Hertfordshire	Berkhamsted	27.2– 27.5	43.8– 44.3	A416 – Chesham	
Hertfordshire	Wigginton	31.6– 32.1	50.9– 51.7	A4251 south-east to B4635 – Northchurch, Berkhamsted, Wigginton, Tring	To B4635 and Tring signed north-west only, Berkhamsted and Wigginton south-east only
Hertfordshire–Buckinghamshire boundary	Drayton Beauchamp–Tring boundary	33.7– 34.1	54.2– 54.9	B488 / B4009 / B4635 to B489 – Wendover, Dunstable, Tring	
Buckinghamshire	Drayton Beauchamp–Buckland	35.3	56.8	A489 – Marsworth, Pitstone, Ivinghoe, Aston Clinton	South-east exit and north-west entrance
Buckinghamshire	Aston Clinton	36.5	58.7	College Road North	
Buckinghamshire	Weston Turville	37.4	60.2	End freeway	
Buckinghamshire	Aylesbury	39.1	62.9	Ring Road (A4157 west) to A418 / A413	To A418 and A413 signed north-west only; eastern terminus of A4157
Buckinghamshire	Aylesbury	39.8	64.1	A418 north-east / A413 north – Leighton Buzzard, Milton Keynes, Buckingham	A413 and Buckingham signed north-west only; south-eastern terminus of A418 / A413 concurrency
Buckinghamshire	Aylesbury	40.0	64.4	A413 south (Walton Street) to A4010 – Amersham, Wycombe	North-western terminus of A413 concurrency
Buckinghamshire	Aylesbury	41.5	66.8	A418 south-west / Oxford Road (A4156 north-east) to M40 – Oxford, Bicester, Thame, Stone	Only Oxford signed south-east; north-western terminus of A418 concurrency; south-western terminus of A418
Buckinghamshire	Aylesbury	41.1	66.1	Haydon Road (A4157 east) / Bicester Road to A413 / A418 – Buckingham, Leighton Buzzard, Milton Keynes, Watermead	Watermead signed north-west only; western terminus of A4157
Buckinghamshire	Berryfields	42.4	68.2	Paradise Orchard (A4199 east) / Sir Henry Lee Cres to A413 – Buckingham	Information signed north-west only; western terminus of A4199
Oxfordshire	Ambrosden–Bicester boundary	55.9	90.0	A4421 north (Wretchwick Way) / B4100 (London Road) / Gravenhill Road North – Buckingham, Bicester, Aynhoe, Launton	Aynho signed north-west only; southern terminus of A4421
Oxfordshire	Wendlebury	59.1	95.1	M40 – Midlands, Banbury, London; A34 south – Newbury, Oxford	North-western terminus; northern terminus of A34; M40 junction 9
1.000 mi = 1.609 km; 1.000 km = 0.621 mi

=== Second segment ===
County	Location	mi	km	Destinations	Notes
West Midlands	Solihull			M42 / M1 / M5 / M6 / M40 – The North, The South West, Coventry, London, Warwick, Stratford A4141 south-east (Warwick Road) – Knowle	South-eastern terminus; north-western terminus of A4141; M42 junction 5
West Midlands	Solihull	0.3	0.48	B4025 – Solihull	Grade-separated junction; north-west exit and south-east entrance
West Midlands	Birmingham	5.0	8.0	A4040 south (Fox Hollies Road) – Hall Green, King's Heath	No access from A41 north-west to A4040 south or from A4040 north to A41 south-east; south-eastern terminus of A4040 concurrency
West Midlands	Birmingham	5.1	8.2	A4040 north to A45 – Yardley, Stechford	North-western terminus of A4040 concurrency
West Midlands	Birmingham	6.8	10.9	A34 south (Stratford Road) – Stratford, Shirley, Hall Green	No access from A41 north-west to A34 south or from A34 north to A41 south-east; south-eastern terminus of A34 concurrency
West Midlands	Birmingham	7.7	12.4	A4540 (Ring Road) / Camp Hill (B4100) to M5 / A38(M) / M6 / A38 / A435 / A47 / A45 – Bromsgrove, Redditch, Lichfield, Coventry, Balsall Heath, Highgate	North-western terminus of A34 concurrency; south-eastern terminus of A4540 concurrency
West Midlands	Birmingham	7.7	12.4	Gap in route around Birmingham	
West Midlands	Birmingham	7.7	12.4	A4540 / Soho Hill to A38(M) / M6 / M5 / A456 / A45 / A34 – Coventry, Wolverhampton, Kidderminster, Dudley, Walsall	North-western terminus of A4540 concurrency
West Midlands	Birmingham	8.8	14.2	A4040 south (Boulton Road) – Winson Green, Bearwood	South-eastern terminus of A4040 concurrency
West Midlands	Birmingham	8.9	14.3	A4040 north (Rookery Road) / Queens Head Road to A34 / A38 – Walsall, Sutton Coldfield, Handsworth Wood, Perry Barr	Only Handsworth Wood and Perry Barr signed south-east; north-western terminus of A4040 concurrency
West Midlands	Birmingham	9.7	15.6	A4040 east (Island Road) to A453 – Sutton Coldfield, Handsworth Wood, Perry Barr	No access from A41 north-east to A4040 east
West Midlands	West Bromwich	10.6	17.1	M5 to M6 / M1 / M42 – The South West, The North West, Worcester, London A4252 south (Kenrick Way) – Oldbury, Smethwick	M5 junction 1; northern terminus of A4252
West Midlands	West Bromwich	11.2	18.0	A4031 south – Smethwick, Oldbury	Grade-separated junction; south-eastern exit and north-western entrance; south-eastern terminus of A4031 concurrency
West Midlands	West Bromwich	11.5– 11.9	18.5– 19.2	A4031 north – Walsall, West Bromwich	Grade-separated junction; north-western terminus of A4031 concurrency
West Midlands	West Bromwich	12.2	19.6	A4196 north (Old Meeting Street) / Carter's Green – West Bromwich, Hill Top	Hill Top signed north-west only; southern terminus of A4196
West Midlands	West Bromwich	13.4	21.6	A461 south-west / George Henry Road – Dudley, Great Bridge, Tipton	Tipton signed north-west only; south-eastern terminus of A461 concurrency
West Midlands	Wednesbury	14.6	23.5	Leabrook Road (A4037 south) / Atlantic Way – Tipton	Northern terminus of A4037
West Midlands	Wednesbury	14.9	24.0	A461 north-east (Dudley Street) / Hallens Drive to M6 / M5 – Walsall, Wednesbury	North-western terminus of A461 concurrency
West Midlands	Wednesbury	16.0	25.7	A4444 north (Black Country New Road) / A4038 east (Moxley Road) to M6 – Walsall, Dudley, Darlaston	Southern terminus of A4444; western terminus of A4038
West Midlands	Bilston	16.4	26.4	A4098 south (Great Bridge Road) – Great Bridge	Northern terminus of A4098
West Midlands	Bilston	17.0	27.4	A463 (Black Country Route) / Brook Street to M6 / M5 / A454 – Dudley, Walsall, West Bromwich, Birmingham, Ettingshall, Coseley, Willenhall, Wednesfield	
West Midlands	Wolverhampton	18.6	29.9	A4126 south (Ettingshall Road) / Dixon Street – Ettingshall	Northern terminus of A4126
West Midlands	Wolverhampton	19.5	31.4	A449 north (Ring Road / A4150) / A454 east (Middle Cross) to M5 / M6 / M54 / A460 – City centre, Telford, Stafford, Cannock, Walsall	South-eastern terminus of A449 / A454 / A4150 concurrency
West Midlands	Wolverhampton	19.8	31.9	A4123 south-east to M5 / A459 – Birmingham, Dudley, Coseley, Sedgley	North-western terminus of A4123
West Midlands	Wolverhampton	20.1	32.3	A449 south (Penn Road) to School Street / A491 – City centre, Kidderminster, Penn, Wombourne, Stourbridge	North-western terminus of A449 concurrency
West Midlands	Wolverhampton	20.4	32.8	Ring Road (A4150) / Darlington Street to M54 / M6 north / A449 / A460 / A454 – City centre, Connock, Walsall	North-western terminus of A4150 concurrency
West Midlands	Wolverhampton	20.7	33.3	A454 west (Compton Road) / Bath Road – Bridgnorth, Compton	No access from A41 south-east to A454 west; north-western terminus of A454 concurrency
Staffordshire	Perton–Codsall boundary	25.4	40.9	A464 west (Holyhead Road) – Shifnal	Eastern terminus of A464
Shropshire	Tong	21.9	35.2	M54 to M6 – Telford, Birmingham	M54 junction 3
Shropshire–Staffordshire boundary	Weston-under-Lizard–Shropshire–Sheriffhales boundary	32.3	52.0	A5 – Telford, Cannock, Weston-under-Lizard	
Shropshire	Chetwynd Aston	37.3	60.0	A518 west – Telford, Newport	Newport signed north-west only; south-eastern terminus of A518 concurrency
Shropshire	Newport	38.0	61.2	A518 east / Stafford Road – Stafford, Newport	North-western terminus of A518 concurrency
Shropshire	Newport	38.9	62.6	A519 north / B5062 (Forton Road) – Eccleshall, Newport, Shrewsbury	Southern terminus of A519
Shropshire	Hinstock	44.0	70.8	A529 north (Chester Road) – Hinstock, Goldstone	Southern terminus of A529
Shropshire	Ternhill	49.4	79.5	A53 to A442 – Shrewsbury, Shawbury, Hodnet, Newcastle-under-Lyme, Market Drayton, Telford	
Shropshire	Prees Heath	56.4	90.8	A49 south – South Wales, Shrewsbury	South Wales signed south-east only; south-eastern terminus of A49 concurrency
Shropshire	Whitchurch	58.0	93.3	A525 east / B5476 (Tilstock Road) to A530 – Newcastle, Nantwich, Wem, Whitchurch	South-eastern terminus of A525 concurrency
Shropshire	Whitchurch	59.5	95.8	A525 west / B5364 (Wrexham Road) to A495 – Wrexham, Oswestry, Whitchurch, Ellesmere	North-western terminus of A525 concurrency
Shropshire	Whitchurch	60.3	97.0	A49 north / B5395 (Chester Road) – Warrington, Whitchurch	North-western terminus of A49 concurrency
Cheshire	Broxton	69.0	111.0	A534 (Broxton Road / Barnhill Road) – Wrexham, Nantwich, Farndon, Holt, Bulkeley	
Cheshire	Great Boughton–Christleton boundary	77.4	124.6	A55 west / A5115 west / Caldy Valley Road to A483 – North Wales, Wrexham, Chester, Huntington	Eastern terminus of A5115; M55 east junction 39
Cheshire	Great Boughton–Christleton boundary	78.0	125.5	A51 (Vicars Cross Road) to M6 / M53 / M56 / A483 – Chester, Nantwich, Ellesmere Port, Manchester, North Wales, Wrexham, Northwich, Winsford	To M6, M53, M56, Ellesmere Port and Manchester signed north-west only; To A483, North Wales and Wrexham south-east only
Cheshire	Chester	79.0	127.1	A56 (Warrington Road) to M53 / M56 / A483 – Chester, Helsby, Frodsham, North Wales, Wrexham	Helsby and Frodsham signed north-west only; To A483, North Wales and Wrexham south-east only
Cheshire	Moston	81.2	130.7	A5116 south (Liverpool Road) – Chester	Northern terminus of A5116
Cheshire	Backford	82.4	132.6	A5032 north (Whitby Lane) to M53 / M56 – Ellesmere Port	To M53 and M56 signed north-west only; southern terminus of A5032
Cheshire	Ellesmere Port–Backford boundary	83.3	134.1	A5117 to M53 / M56 / A550 / A5032 – North Wales, Queensferry, Ellesmere Port, Runcorn, Warrington, Manchester	To M53, A5032 and Ellsmere Port signed north-west only; To M56, Runcorn, Warrington and Manchester south-east only
Cheshire	Hooton	86.8	139.7	A550 south (Welsh Road) – North Wales, Queensferry	Information signed south-east only; northern terminus of A550
Merseyside	Birkenhead	87.3	140.5	M53 – Wallasey, Liverpool, Ellesmere Port, Wrexham, Warrington	Wrexham and Warrington signed south-east only; M53 junction 5
Merseyside	Birkenhead	93.8	151.0	A5227 west – Town centre Borough Road (A5227 west) to A5027 / A553 / A552 – Town centre, Wallasey, Hoylake, Heswall	A5227 signed north-west only; To routes, Wallasey, Hoylake and Heswall southwest only; grade-separated junction
Merseyside	Birkenhead	93.8	151.0	A41 north-west to A554 / A5027 – Wallasey	North-west exit and south-east entrance; grade-separated junction
Merseyside	Birkenhead–Liverpool boundary	94.0– 96.0	151.3– 154.5	Queensway Tunnel under River Mersey	
Merseyside	Liverpool	96.1	154.7	Byron Street / Dale Street / Whitechapel (A57 / A5038) / William Brown Street to A59 – Southport	North-western terminus
1.000 mi = 1.609 km; 1.000 km = 0.621 mi: Concurrency terminus; Incomplete access

== History of the road number ==
The original (1923) route was Stanmore north-west of London to Oakengates, west of Wolverhampton, in Shropshire, meeting the A5 at both ends.

The A41 was extended by numbering as follows:

The northern extension dates from 1935; in Shropshire, it swapped with a combination of the A464/A529; from Kingswood Common to Nantwich, Cheshire and the original A529 ran from Hinstock to Chester. North of Chester, the A41 replaced part of the A51.

The southern extension dates from after the Second World War using Watford Way which opened in about 1930 as the A5088. In the remaining years after 1935, it was renumbered A500.

== See also ==
- Great Britain road numbering scheme
- Sparrows Herne Turnpike Road
- Wirral Line
