= List of road junctions in the United Kingdom: I-K =

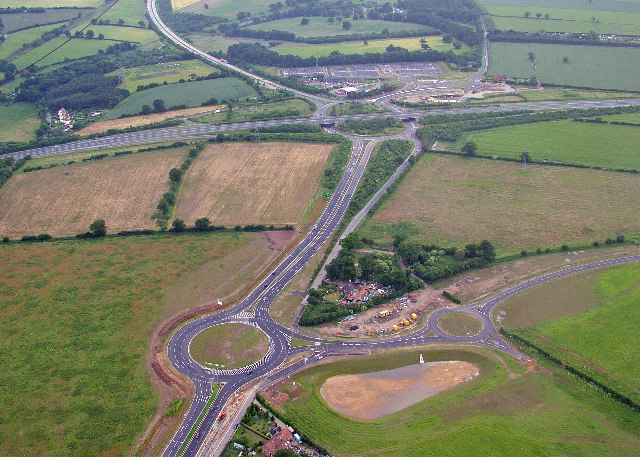
Thickthorn Interchange

This is part of the list of road junctions in the United Kingdom.

Many road junctions are named after pubs. For more information regarding the derivation of pub names see pub names.

== I ==
Junction name	Type	Location	Roads	Grid reference	Notes
Ickles Roundabout		Rotherham, South Yorkshire	A630 Centenary Way; A6178 Sheffield Road; A6021 Sheffield Road	53°25′28″N 1°21′49″W	
Illston Cross Roads		Illston on the Hill	B6047 New Inn Lane; Illston Road; Noseley Road	SP720990	
Innis Downs Roundabout		Bodmin, Cornwall	A30; A391; A389 Truro Road	SX030630	
Inveralmond Roundabout		Perth, Scotland	A9; A912 Dunkeld Road; Ruthvenfield Road	NO097262	
Iron Bridge		Southall, LB Ealing	A4020 Uxbridge Road; A4127 Windmill Lane; A4127 Greenford Road	51°30′34″N 0°21′20″W	
Iron Bridge Cross	T junction	North Tawton, Devon	B3215; unclass., to Taw Green	50.784°N 3.914°W	Named on road sign
Islington Green	Roundabout	Islington, London	A1 Upper Street; A104 Essex Road	51°32′10″N 0°06′12″W	
Ivy Bush	Crossroads	Birmingham	A456 Hagley Road; B4124 Chad Road; B4124 Monument Road; Vicarage Road	SP047860	

== J ==
Junction Name	Type	Location	Roads	Grid Reference	Notes
Jack Olding's Roundabout: aka Oldings Corner	Roundabout Interchange	Hatfield, Hertfordshire	A1(M) J4; A414 Great North Road; A1001 Comet Way (formerly A1); A6129 Great North Road	51°46′41″N 0°13′17″W	named after Jack Olding, who had a factory on this site (the land now being occupied by Tesco)
Jay's Green: aka Linton		Ross-on-Wye, Herefordshire	M50 J3; B4221	51°56′02″N 2°29′03″W	
Job's Corner		Hickstead, West Sussex	Jobs Lane; Stairbridge Lane	TQ273203	
Johnson's Corner		Hamstreet, Kent	A2070; C628 Marsh Road	51°03′02″N 0°51′17″E	named after a heroic pilot who lost his life trying to crash land here rather than bail out and risk the plane crashing into the village - AdamGColton
Joiners Square		Stoke-on-Trent, Staffordshire	A50; A52		
The Jolly Farmer		Camberley, Surrey	A30 London Road; A325 Portsmouth Road; B3015 The Maultway	SU897619	

== K ==
Junction Name	Type	Location	Roads	Grid Reference	Notes
Keir Roundabout	Roundabout	Dunblane, Fife	M9 J11; A9; B8033 (formerly A9); B824	NS778992	near Keir Home Farm
Kelty Junction		Kelty, Fife	M90 J4; A909; B914	NT134939	
Kenninghall		Edmonton, LB Enfield	A406 Angel Road; Montagu Road (spur of A1055)	51°36′49″N 0°03′03″W	
Kennington Roundabout		Oxford, Oxfordshire	A423 Southern By-pass Road; A4144 Abingdon Road	SP520035	
Kents Hill		Kents Hill, Milton Keynes	H8 (A421) Standing Way; V10 Brickhill Street	52°01′53″N 0°42′26″W	
Kents Hill Park		Kents Hill, Milton Keynes	V10 Brickhill Street; Hawkhurst Gate	52°01′44″N 0°42′24″W	
Kersbrook Cross		Cornwall	B3257; unclass.	SX310752	
Keston Mark		Keston Mark, LB Bromley	A232 Croydon Road; A233 Oakley Road; A233 Westerham Road	51°22′02″N 0°02′20″E	
Kew Bridge Junction		Chiswick, LB Hounslow	A205 Kew Bridge; A315 Kew Bridge Road	51°29′20″N 0°17′16″W	
Kew Green		Kew, LB Richmond upon Thames	A205 Mortlake Road; A205 Kew Road; A307 Kew Road	51°28′59″N 0°17′14″W	
Keyford Roundabout		Yeovil, Somerset	A37 Dorchester Road; Church Lane; Pavyotts Lane	50°55′21″N 2°38′06″W	
Keymelford Cross	T junction	Colebrooke, Devon	unclass. roads to: Brandise Corner E; Yeoford SW; Colebrooke NW	50.7815°N 3.7209°W	Named on fingerpost
Kidbrooke Interchange	Crossroads	Kidbrooke, Royal Borough of Greenwich	A2 Rochester Way Relief Road; A2213 Kidbrooke Road	51°27′46″N 0°01′45″E	
Kidney Wood Roundabout	Roundabout	Luton, Bedfordshire	M1 J10a (Spur); A1081 Airport Way; A1081 London Road (formerly A6)	51°51′34″N 0°24′53″W	
Killingworth Interchange	Diamond interchange	Killingworth, Tyne and Wear	A19 road; A1056 road	55°02′45″N 1°33′06″W	
Kiln Farm Roundabout		Fullers Slade, Milton Keynes	V4 Watling Street; H2 Millers Way	52°02′47″N 0°49′59″W	
Kilsby		Kilsby, Northamptonshire	M1 J17; M45	52°19′34″N 1°08′33″W	
King's Cross		Kings Cross, LB Camden	A501 Euston Road; A501 Pentonville Road; A5200 Gray's Inn road; A5203 Caledonian Road	51°31′48″N 0°07′26″W	See Kings Cross entry for a history of the naming of the junction.
King's Head: see Bearwood
Kingsbury Circle		Kingsbury, LB Brent	A4006 Kingsbury Road; A4006 Kenton Road; A4140 Honeypot Lane; A4140 Fryent Way	51°35′06″N 0°16′54″W	
Kingsmead Roundabout		Kingsmead, Milton Keynes	H7 Chaffron Way; V1 Snelshall Street	51°59′51″N 0°47′54″W	
Kingston Roundabout		Kingston, Milton Keynes	H8 (A421) Standing Way; A5130; H9 Groveway	52°01′59″N 0°40′43″W	
Kinross Junction		Kinross, Perth and Kinross	M90 J6; A977; A922	NO110027	
Kipping's Cross		Royal Tunbridge Wells, East Sussex	A21; B2160; unclass.	51°08′07″N 0°20′57″E	
Kirkliston Interchange		Kirkliston, City of Edinburgh	M9 J1a; M9 Kirkliston Spur	NT115745	
Kitterford Cross		Ugborough, Devon	A3121, North and SW; B3196, South; unclass., NE to Avonwick	50.3914°N 3.8440°W	
Knaves Beech Interchange		High Wycombe, Buckinghamshire	M40 J3; A40; A4094	51°36′14″N 0°41′37″W	
Knebworth Roundabout		Giffard Park, Milton Keynes	V10 Brickhill Street; Knebworth Gate; Wedgwood Avenue	52°04′23″N 0°44′41″W	
Knoll Roundabout		Leatherhead, Surrey	A24 Leatherhead Road; A24 By-Pass Road; A243 By-Pass Road; B2122 Epsom Road	TQ174568	
Knowlhill Roundabout		Knowlhill, Milton Keynes	H6 Childs Way; V4 Watling Street	52°01′22″N 0°46′37″W	
