= A449 road =

Major road in England and Wales

Coordinates: 52.23989°N 2.22731°W

A449

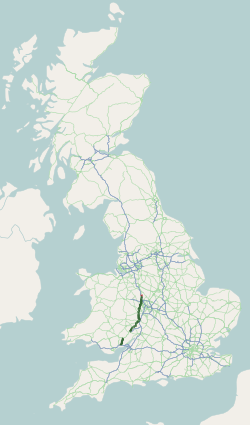

Route information
- Maintained by National Highways, English local authorities and South Wales Trunk Road Agency
- Length: 104 mi (167 km)

Major junctions
- North end: Stafford
- M6 J13 M54 J2; M5 J6 M50 J4; M4 J24; A34; A5 A460 A4150 A4124; A41 A454 A4123 A459 A463 A491 A4101 A458 A451 A456 A448; A38 A4440 A417; A40 A472
- South end: Newport

Location
- Country: United Kingdom
- Primary destinations: Wolverhampton; Kidderminster; Worcester; Ross-on-Wye; Monmouth

Road network
- Roads in the United Kingdom; Motorways; A and B road zones
| ← A448 | → A450 |

The A449 is a major road in the United Kingdom. It runs north from junction 24 of the A48 road at Newport in South Wales to Stafford in Staffordshire.

The southern section of the road, between Ross on Wye and Newport forms part of the trunk route from Stafford to Newport, avoiding the Severn Bridge

== Route ==
=== Newport – Ross-on-Wye ===
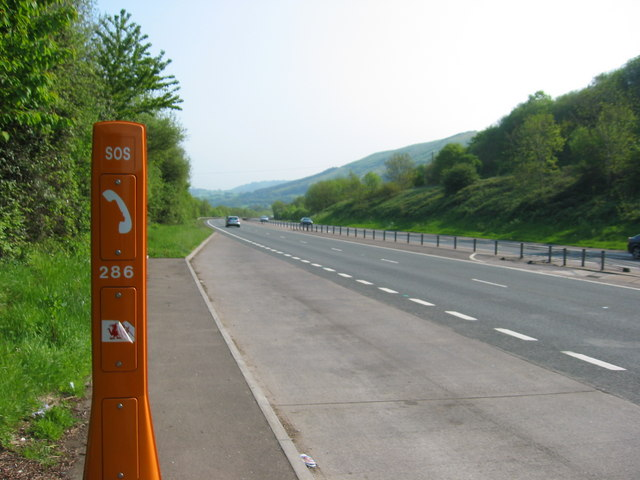
The A449 on the outskirts of Newport.

The A449 starts on the M4 at the Coldra Interchange (J24) in Newport and is dual carriageway all the way to Raglan.

The section from the A40 junction at Raglan to the A472 junction at Usk, known as the New Midlands Road, was one of the first sections to be dualled, opening on 16 October 1970. A special postmark dated 8 December 1972 was produced showing the opening of the A449 by The Secretary of State for Wales.

Between Raglan and Ross-on-Wye the A449 is concurrent with the A40.

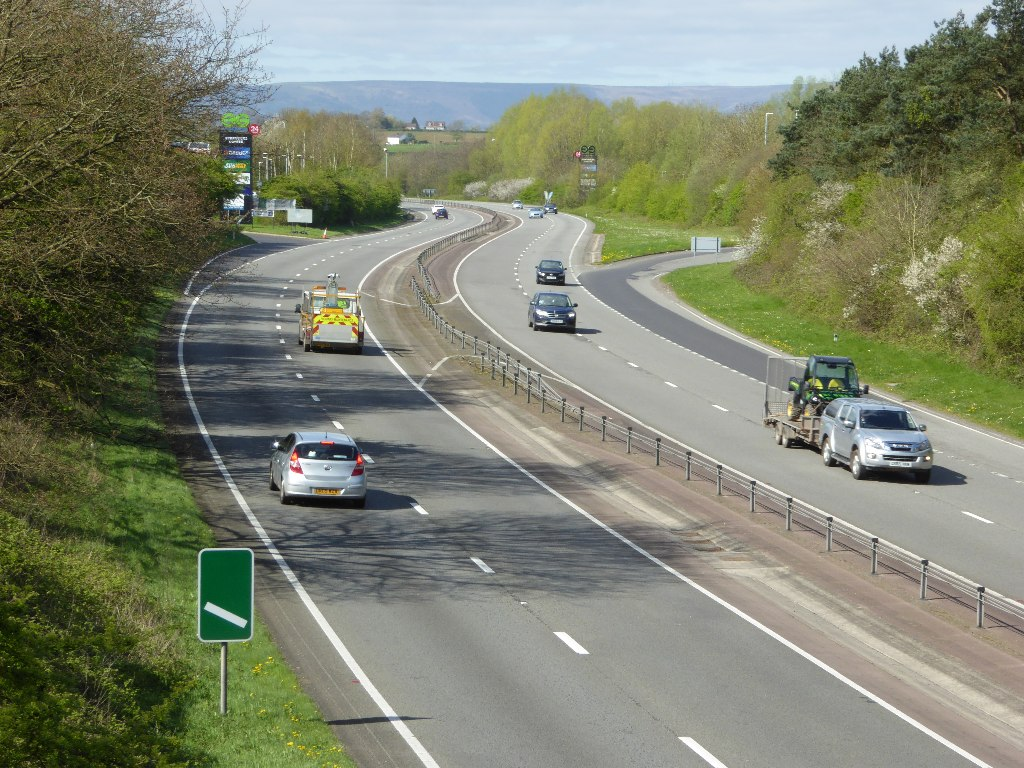
Raglan services in April 2017

The Raglan to Mitchel Troy section opened on Saturday 1 February 1969, being five miles of dual carriageway.

The Monmouth to Mitchel Troy section, directly south of Monmouth opened on Friday 30 June 1967. There was 2.5 miles of dual carriageway, costing £2.25m, and included a tunnel. It was the first of four sections to Newport, being 20 miles, costing £11m in total.

The Dixton Church to Wye Bridge section, forming the Monmouth bypass started in early August 1965. The £574,315 contract, north of Dixton, was awarded to Tarmac Civil Engineering. A worker was killed. It opened around February 1967, costing £750,000 for one mile, and was six months early.

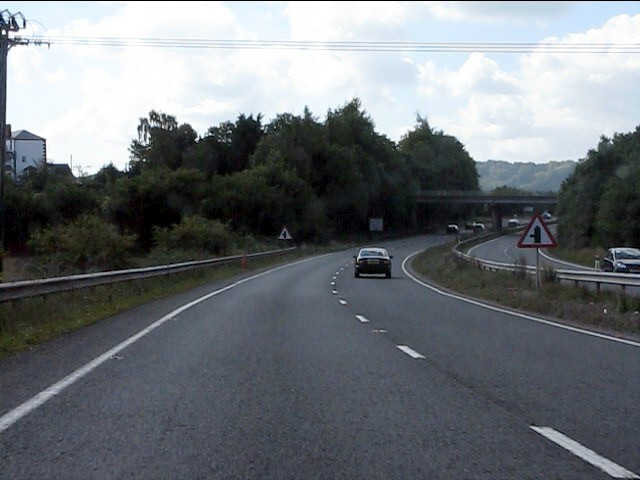
Goodrich Cross in August 2010

The Goodrich Cross to Hereford county boundary section started around early 1962, being part of the 'Ross to Monmouth Improvement'. The contract of £1,409,827 was awarded in late August 1961 to Turiff Construction for 4.4 miles of dual carriageway.

The contract of £600,655 for 3.5 miles of dual carriageway of the Ross to Goodrich Cross Improvement was awarded in 1961 to Hadsphaltic Construction, of Hatchlands Road, Redhill in Surrey.

=== Ross-on-Wye – Worcester ===
The road becomes quite twisty on departing Ross-on-Wye, but straightens out a little before arriving at Ledbury. The road turns northwards upon crossing into Worcestershire at Little Malvern and skirts the eastern slopes of the Malvern Hills through the town of Great Malvern. It then crosses Worcester's ring road, the A4440, at a roundabout near Powick.

=== Worcester – Wolverhampton ===
North of Worcester, a spur road of the same number heads towards the M5 Junction 6, while the main route continues towards Kidderminster, concurrent with the A442. Between Claines and Hartlebury the A449 is once again dual carriageway, but much tinkering has left the road with a single lane each way and 50 miles per hour (80 km/h) speed restriction. The road becomes urban again while passing through Kidderminster. It then heads north into Staffordshire, passing between Kinver and Stourbridge and crossing the A458 at Stourton. The A491 meets it just north of Kingswinford. Continuing northwards, it passes Wombourne (becoming dual carriageway once more) being joined by the A463 before turning sharply north-east into the outskirts of Wolverhampton and meeting the Ring Road.

=== Wolverhampton – Stafford ===
The road resumes its journey northwards, passing Molineux Stadium (home of Wolverhampton Wanderers F.C.) and leaving the city just south of Junction 2 of the M54. It originally ran through the centre of Wolverhampton until the 1980s, when all roads within the ring road were declassified. Around the same time, the section of Waterloo Road on which Molineux Stadium stands was declassified and the A459 Stafford Street (north of the Ring Road) and Lower Stafford Street became part of the A449.

From there it forms part of the link between the M54 and the M6 North. It crosses the A5 at the Gailey Roundabout near the village of Gailey, a short distance west of M6 Junction 12, at which point it reverts to a single carriageway. It passes through Penkridge before crossing the M6 at Junction 13, reaching its terminus at its junction with the A34 in Stafford.

Originally turnpiked under the Stafford, Worcester and Warwick Roads Act 1760 (1 Geo. 3. c. 39), the Wolverhampton-Stafford road was part of the historic London-Liverpool coach route. Notoriously narrow in the 19th century, much of it was turned into dual carriageway between the world wars. The Gailey Roundabout was improved in 1929 and again in 1937, removing parts of the churchyard and the historic Spread Eagle Inn (although the latter was replaced by a new building). Widening at Penkridge between 1932 and 1934 reshaped the western part of the town, resulting in the demolition of many ancient buildings. The dual carriageway between Wolverhampton and Gailey was constructed between 1936 and 1939. This section of the road was featured in Citizen Khan episode "Alia's University".

== Former routes ==
- The original routing of the road was from Bromsgrove – Stourbridge – Wolverhampton – Stafford
- The villages of Hartlebury and Ombersley have been bypassed
- Part of Ledbury is now bypassed
- Between Raglan and Newport the A449 used to run through the towns of Usk and Caerleon, along a now mostly unclassified road to the west, terminating at junction 25 of the M4

== Water crossings ==
- River Trothy, Monmouth
- River Monnow, Monmouth
- River Wye, Ross-on-Wye
- River Leadon, Ledbury
- River Severn, Worcester
- Stourbridge Canal, Stourton
- River Stour, Kinver
- Wom Brook, Wombourne
- Birmingham Canal, Wolverhampton
- Staffordshire and Worcestershire Canal, Coven
- River Penk, Penkridge

== See also ==
- Trunk roads in Wales
