= Wolverhampton Ring Road =

Road in Harlow

Coordinates: 52.5806°N 2.1286°W

A4150
- Wolverhampton Inner Ring Road
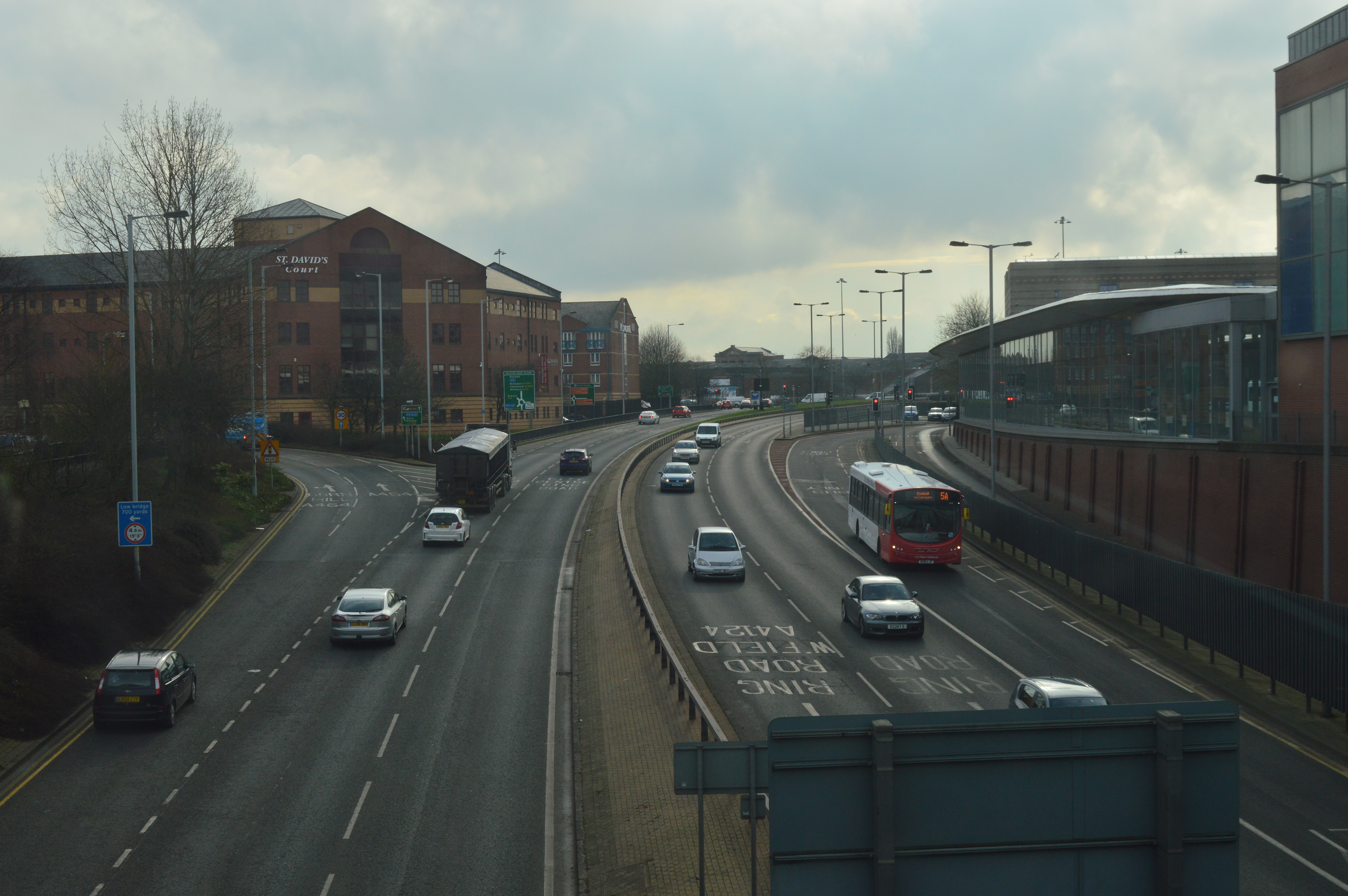
- A4150 - Wolverhampton Ring Road

Route information
- Length: 2.3 mi (3.7 km)

Major junctions
- Southwest end: Wolverhampton
- A449; A41; A449; A4124; A454; A41; A4123
- South end: Wolverhampton

Location
- Country: United Kingdom

Road network
- Roads in the United Kingdom; Motorways; A and B road zones
← A4148	→ A4151

The A4150 Wolverhampton Inner Ring Road is a ring road that encircles the city centre of Wolverhampton in the West Midlands, England. The circumference of the road is around 2.1 miles (3.4 km). Technically, the route is listed as an "Inner Ring Road", although only a tiny section of the "Outer Ring Road" was ever constructed with only one of the two designed carriageways built. A second carriageway was built in 2017 along a short stretch between Patshull Avenue and Stafford Road. The section of outer ring road is called Wobaston Road and locally classified by Wolverhampton City Council as U119.

== Sections ==
It is divided into seven sections, between seven junctions with nearly all of the main routes into the city. The seven sections are all named after saints (e.g. "Ring Road St John's"). Originally the names chosen referred to nearby churches; however, with one section still to be built, it was noticed that St George, St Andrew and St Patrick (the patron saints of England, Scotland and Ireland respectively) were included, but St David (of Wales) was not. Thus the final section was named after St David, but not for any local reason. At the time there was a call for it to be named St. James after the church and square which once occupied the site.

Clockwise from the south-west corner, the sections are as follows:

- Ring Road St Mark's (between the A449 Penn Road and A41 Chapel Ash);
- Ring Road St Andrew's (between the A41 and Waterloo Road);
- Ring Road St Peter's (between Waterloo Road and the A449 Stafford Street);
- Ring Road St Patrick's (between the A449 and A4124 Wednesfield Road);
- Ring Road St David's (between the A4124 and A454 Middle Cross/A41 Bilston Street);
- Ring Road St George's (between the A454/A41 and A4123 Birmingham Road/Dudley Road;
- Ring Road St John's (between the A4123 and A449).

The slip road off the southbound Ring Road St. Davids links to Horseley Fields which formed part of the original A454 route into the City Centre.

Three main roads into the city do not meet the Ring Road, these being the A454 Compton Road from the west, the A459 from the south and the A460 Cannock Road from the north-east; they meet the A41, A4123 and A449 respectively slightly further away from the Ring Road, but within 1/4 mi (0.40 km) in each case. The A459 used to meet the Ring Road at the junction of Dudley Road and Snow Hill but following the introduction of the A4123 gyratory system as part of the construction of the St. George's section of the Ring Road, it has terminated at Grove Street although some maps still show it as continuing to the Ring Road. The A459 also used to continue along Stafford Street (after passing through the city centre) to Five Ways Island along the former A460, B4158 and B4160 before the A449 was rerouted down Stafford Street instead of Waterloo Road which was then declassified.

== History ==
The Ring Road was constructed in stages between 1960 and 1986. The St John's and St Mark's sections were the first to be built in the 1960s. The St David's section to was the final section to be completed, and passes under a bridge connecting the east of the city centre to Wolverhampton railway station. The St John's section was originally single carriageway but was later dualled. It was built as a dual carriageway with very wide central reservations to allow for future grade separation of the junctions, which has never happened. As a result, most of the road has a very green appearance, except for Ring Road St Mark's which has a car park in the centre, reached by an underpass from the city centre. The St. George's Roundabout has a wishbone bridge running through it which carries the Metro light rail line from the City Centre to Bilston Road. Ring Road St. David's has a contraflow bus lane allowing access to the rebuilt bus station which is part of the Interchange project.

== A4150 designation ==
It officially carries the designation A4150, although this does not appear on any signs with the exception of at the junction of Waterloo Road and Jack Hayward Way, near to Molineux stadium, and not on the Ring Road itself.

== Josef Stawinoga ==
The southern section of the ring road was home to Josef Stawinoga, a Polish immigrant known locally as "Fred the Tramp". He set up home in a tent on the ring road's central reservation soon after it opened in the 1960s, and lived there until his death in October 2007 at the age of 87.

== Wolverhampton Station ==
When Ring Road St. David's was built, a bridge over the Ring Road provided the only road route to the railway station. As part of the rebuilding of Wolverhampton Railway Station, a new road access and taxi rank was built off Sun Street with the existing bridge now used by the Midland Metro extension as well as access for parking for station staff.
