= A454 road =

Road in the West Midlands

A454

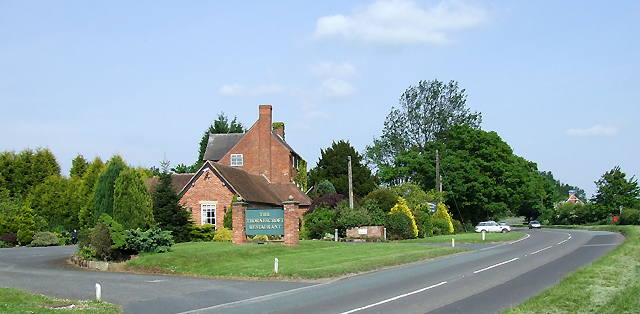
- The A454 between Bridgnorth and Wolverhampton

Route information
- Length: 28.9 mi (46.5 km)

Major junctions
- west end: 52.5292°N 2.3841°W
- A458; A41 A4150 A449 A4124 A463 J10 → M6 motorway A4148; A34 A461 A452 A4026 A5127
- east end: 52.5791°N 1.8296°W

Location
- Country: United Kingdom
- Primary destinations: Wolverhampton; Walsall

Road network
- Roads in the United Kingdom; Motorways; A and B road zones
← A453	→ A456

The A454 is a major road in central England. It runs 28.9 miles (46.5 km) from Bridgnorth to Sutton Coldfield and is an important primary route linking Wolverhampton and Walsall with the M6 motorway.

== Route ==
Starting from Bridgnorth, Shropshire, it runs eastwards, crossing a narrow part of Staffordshire, to Wolverhampton, West Midlands. It then by-passes Willenhall where it becomes the eastern section of "The Black Country Route" before meeting the M6 motorway at Junction 10 on its way to Walsall. It then runs through Aldridge and the Staffordshire village of Little Aston before heading south-east to Four Oaks, to the north of Sutton Coldfield. Due to its course following part of the ring roads around Wolverhampton and Walsall it has overlapping sections with the A41, A4150, A449, A4148, A34 and A461 roads.

== History ==
Re-numbering has taken place along the route since the 1970s. First, The Keyway was opened to the south of Willenhall town centre and became part of the A454, as did Bilston Lane - previously the A463.

In the 1980s, the final stub of the route into Bridgnorth was downgraded to become the B4363 when a by-pass (part of the A458) was opened around the south of the town and a new section of the A454 built meeting the A458 near Stanmore.

Then, in 1995, the Black Country Route was completed between Bilston and Junction 10 of the M6. The final section of this route (which began as the A463) was numbered the A454, which led to Wolverhampton Road West on the Willenhall-Walsall border being downgraded to a B-road, as had happened to the rest of the original A454 through Willenhall when The Keyway was opened some 20 years previously.
