= A4148 road =

Road in England

Coordinates: 52.5885°N 1.9826°W

A4148
- Walsall Ring Road
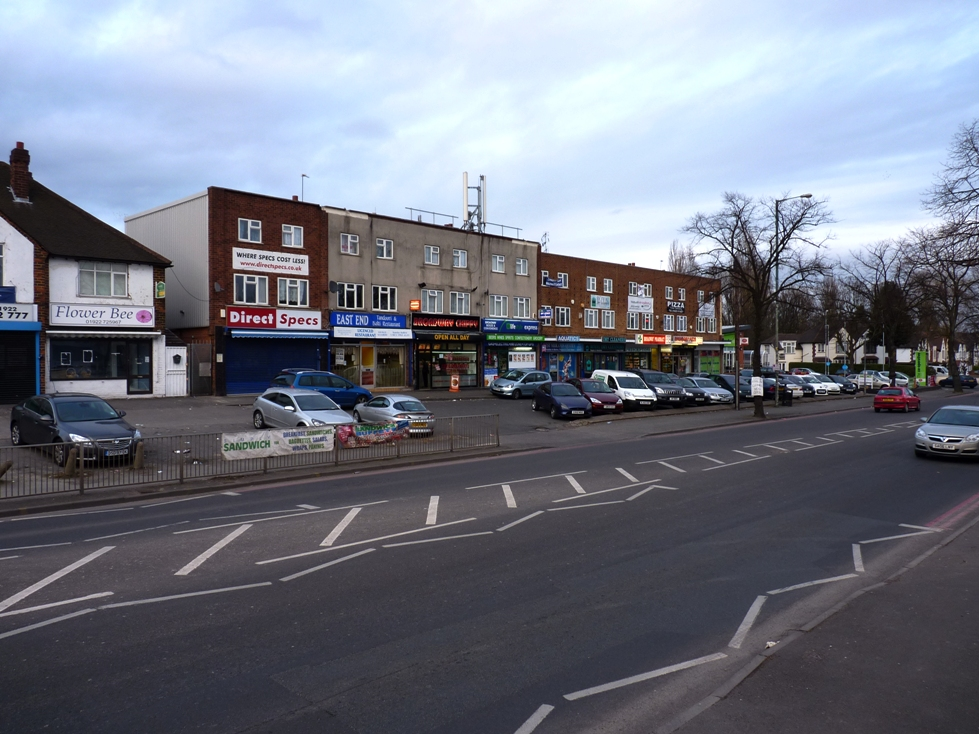
- Parade of shops on the A4148 Broadway West

Route information
- Length: 5.3 mi (8.5 km)

Major junctions
- Orbital around Walsall, West Midlands
- A461; A4038; A454; A34; A4031

Location
- Country: United Kingdom

Road network
- Roads in the United Kingdom; Motorways; A and B road zones
← A4147	→ A4150

The A4148 is an A-class road in the town of Walsall, West Midlands, England. It serves as the town's ring road, as it encircles the town centre, and no road inside it has a number. Major junctions occur where it meets the A34, A454 and A461.

Rather than a purpose-built ring road, such as the nearby A4150 Wolverhampton Inner Ring Road, the A4148 consists of existing streets marked as a ring road. Since 2006, Walsall Council has implemented a number of roadwork projects in an attempt to improve traffic flow. This included eliminating the large roundabout near the Arboretum which was replaced by traffic lights.
