= Black Country Route =

Route information
- Existed: 1986-1988–present

Major junctions
- From: Bilston
- To: Walsall

Location
- Country: United Kingdom

Road network
- Roads in the United Kingdom; Motorways; A and B road zones

The Black Country Route is a road in the West Midlands region of England.

Original plans for an urban motorway were drawn up in 1962 to ease congestion in the Black Country towns of Bilston and Willenhall, as well as giving the residents of Dudley, Coseley and Sedgley a more direct link with the new M6 motorway. A town centre by-pass for Bilston, planned to form a spur road to the main route, was given the go-ahead in 1964. By 1968 work had yet to start on any of the route, but it was appearing on maps as a "proposed motorway" and work was expected to start in the early 1970s. However, none of this happened and within a few years the plans were shelved. However, neighbouring Willenhall did gain a dual carriageway southern by-pass, The Keyway, during the 1970s, which would have linked up to the planned motorway and formed an ideal link road to any further "urban motorway".

However, plans to build the Black Country Route project were revived in the early 1980s, since the congestion in the surrounding area was gradually worsening, and given the go-ahead in 1986. It was necessary to dig up a short section at the end of the existing but unopened continuation of The Keyway which had been built by Walsall Council due to changes to the design of the junction with the Black Country Route.

The route was scheduled to be open to the west of Bilston by the end of the 1980s and fully operational by the early 1990s, although ultimately this would take longer as funding difficulties delayed the construction of the route between Bilston and Walsall.

== Sculptures en route ==
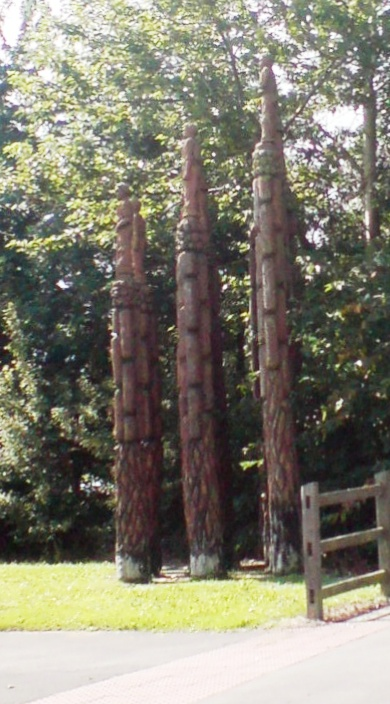
'Steel columns' sculpture, August 2008

At points along the Black Country Route large sculptures can be seen. Some are very large and located in the roundabouts. An example of one of the smaller well-hidden ones is the group of wooden statues designed by Robert Koenig called "Steel Columns." "This sculpture was made from 15 lengths of sweet chestnut which stretch up to 6 metres in height. The male and female figures depicted are based on those found in old Victorian photographs of Bilston. The title "Steel Columns" is a reference to Bilston’s steel making background and the connection the figures had with this history."

As re-development and new development commence along the road route more artworks are commissioned as part of the local planning policy, a strategy the Dudley MBC has employed for many years. This strategy a form of Percent for Art requires the developers to include a budget in their scheme to purchase and commission an artform as part of the development. For example on the tower of the new Citadel building a stainless steel hovering kestrel, beady eyes focused, talons outstretched, hovering and ready to strike, can be found suspended 14m from the ground. The sculpture was design by the British Sculptor John Mckenna and his artistic associate Steve Field of the Dudley Borough Public Art unit at Himley Hall.

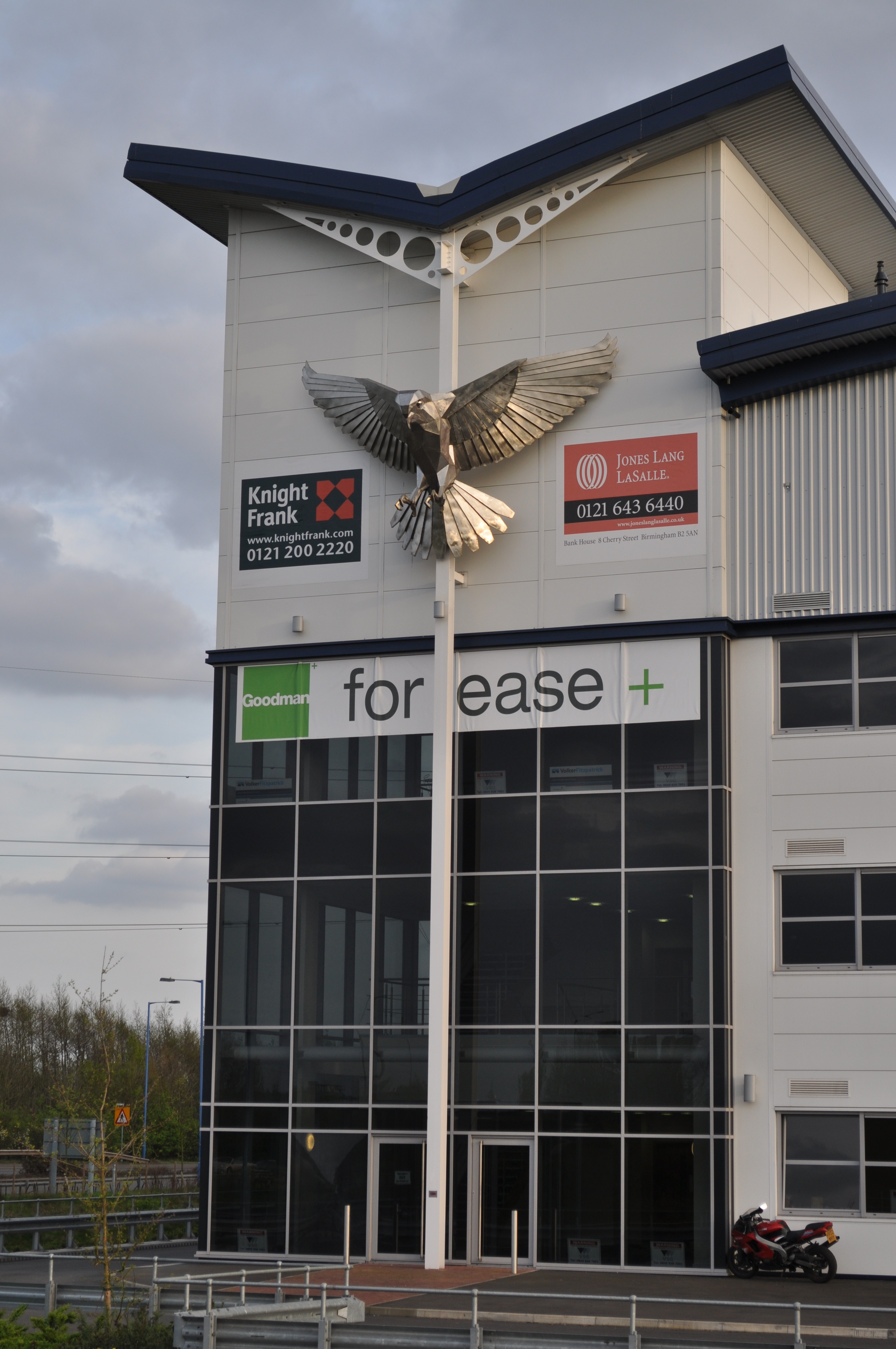
'Hovering kestrel' by John McKenna sculptor 2009

The Kestrel theme came about due to the proximity of abundant wildlife adjacent to the new build development. A small stream, the natural habit of wildlife in the area was diverted around the building as a feature rather than being hidden underground in a culvert beneath the building. The large 6 metre span bird of prey was fabricated in 316 grade sheet stainless steel, at the A4A art for architecture studios, in Ayrshire, Scotland and installed in February 2009. The sculpture was satin polish finished so as not to be too reflective and distractive, when seen by passing motorists from the new road and sympathetic in span shape to the design by Webb Gray of the buildings' butterfly roof.

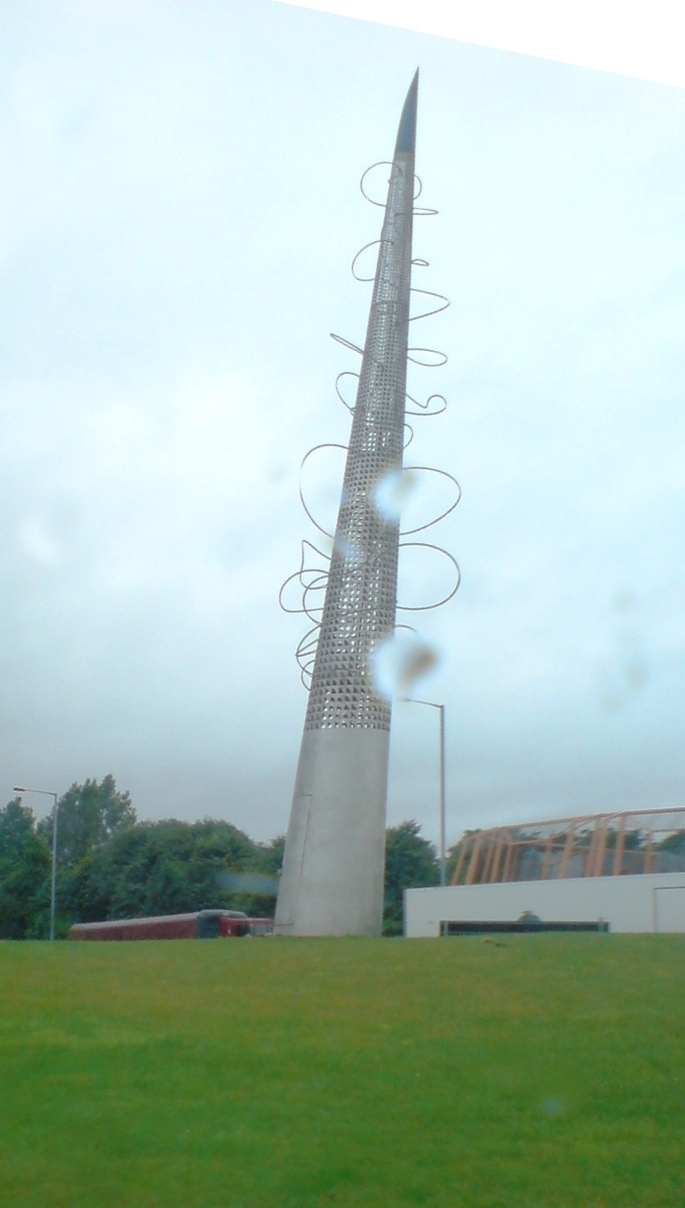
'Tower of Light' by Eillis O’Connel, July 2008

An example of a larger work is the tapering steel column designed by Eillis O’Connel called "Tower of Light". It "is a futuristic design which comprises a spectacular tower of stainless steel mesh, interwoven with fibre optic cables that light at night and a translucent blue resin casting at the apex."

== Route completion ==
The first phase of the Black Country Route, connecting the A4123 Birmingham New Road with the new Sedgmoor Park housing estate, was opened in 1986. The second phase, crossing the Main Line railway and the Birmingham Canal and joining up with Bilston town centre, was opened in 1988.

The third phase by-passed the south of Bilston town centre and reached the A41 on its completion 1991. Curiously, a short stretch of the route between the two completed stretches did not open until December 1992.

The next phase was opened in February 1995, between Oxford Street and Hare Street, followed by the link between The Keyway south of Willenhall and Junction 10 of the M6 motorway on the border of Willenhall and Walsall. The completion of an overbridge crossing Darlaston Lane on 21 July 1995 saw the full route opened by European Commissioner and former Labour Party leader Neil Kinnock.

Its completion coincided with the completion of another substantial road project - the Black Country New Road - which linked Bilston with West Bromwich.

The building of the route is criticised for reaching maximum vehicle capacity within weeks of opening, especially in the area East bound towards junction 10 of the M6 motorway, which has severe tailbacking in rush hour periods. Due to financial cut backs over the intervening years of planning, the route was downgraded with surface level roundabouts around the town of Bilston, thus hardly alleviating any of the traffic congestion that the split level junctions were designed to help avoid. Traffic signal systems were installed for one Bilston roundabout with more planned due to the overwhelming traffic around the town, thus adding to the congestion problems that are particularly problematic at rush hours. To try and combat the congestion, work started in 2020 to widen the bridges over the M6 at Junction 10.
