= A4040 road =

A4040

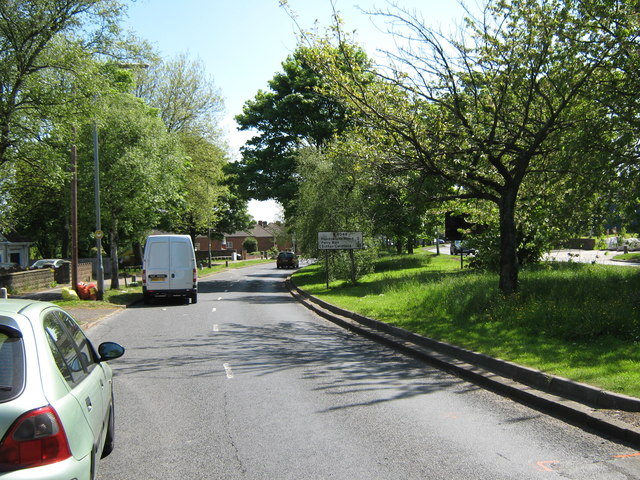
- Photo of the A4040 in Handsworth

Route information
- Length: 54.61 mi (87.89 km)

Major junctions
- Orbital around Birmingham
- A457; A41; A34; A38; A47; A45; A41; A34 A435 A441; A38 A456 A5127

Location
- Country: United Kingdom

Road network
- Roads in the United Kingdom; Motorways; A and B road zones

The A4040 is the Outer Ring Road in Birmingham. It is the route followed by the Birmingham Outer Circle bus route. It is a major road in Birmingham which is 54.61 miles long which connects different areas of Birmingham via 8 different segments. Parts of the road have become notorious for having mobile speed cameras along its route. It is also the road with the most crashes per 1 million vehicle-miles driven in the West Midlands and outside of London.

== History ==
The A4040 was formed mainly of redesignated old roads. It came across due to the number 11 bus, which itself came across in 1923. However the A4040 designation did not come until around the 1960s. When exactly it came across is unclear, but the first OS map that included it was published in 1967. Some parts of it were originally a 40mph road. However, these have all become 30mph roads, with none of the A4040 being a 40mph road, explicitly starting from March 2025.

== Safety ==
The A4040 is the most dangerous road (per most crashes per 1 million vehicle-miles driven) in the West Midlands, and also the most dangerous outside of London, with 3.3 average accidents per 1 million vehicle-miles driven. It has also been known to have many fatal crashes on the route as a whole.

== Route ==
The route of the A4040 passes through a lot of area's in Birmingham, some of these including:

- Harborne
- Selly Oak
- Smethwick
- Edgbaston
- Handsworth
- Aston
- Erdington
- Kings Norton
- Kings Heath
- Acocks Green
- Tyseley
- Yardley
- Stechford
- Washford Heath

These areas are all also places which the 11 Bus follows.

== West Midlands Bus route 11 ==
The West Midlands Bus Route 11 mostly follows the A4040. At one point, the bus route was the longest urban bus route in Europe (after Coventry's 360 Bus Route ceased on the 23rd July 2016.) This was until the bus route split into two due to delays caused by roadworks at Perry Barr, however, as of June 2026, these measurements are still in place, causing outrage among locals. These 2 separate routes however, do still follow the A4040 for most of its length.
