= A491 road =

Road in UK

A491

Route information
- Length: 12 mi (19 km)

Major junctions
- South end: Lydiate Ash; 52.3788°N 2.0473°W
- M5 J4; A38 A456 A4036 A458 A451 A461 A449
- North end: Wall Heath; 52.5083°N 2.1721°W

Location
- Country: United Kingdom
- Primary destinations: Stourbridge

Road network
- Roads in the United Kingdom; Motorways; A and B road zones

The A491 is an A road in Zone 4 of the Great Britain numbering scheme.

== History ==
The road north of Oldswinford forms part of an ancient road, probably of Anglo-Saxon origin, joining the burhs of Worcester and Stafford. The crossing of the River Stour was probably the swine-ford that gave rise to the placenames Kingswinford and Oldswinford, and later to the name Stourbridge.

The road from Wordsley Green to the Market House in Stourbidge and so to Bromsgrove was turnpiked by the Hagley and Birmingham Road Act 1753 (26 Geo. 2. c. 47). The same act also dealt with several other roads from that Market House, as well as the road from Birmingham through Halesowen and Hagley to Blakedown Pool, but that was managed by separate trustees from the Worcester and Warwick Roads (No. 2) Act 1773 (13 Geo. 3. c. 107). Its continuation north of Wordsley Green, through Wolverhampton, and Stafford to Stone, much of it now part of A449 road was turnpiked by the Wolverhampton Turnpike Act 1760 (1 Geo. 3. c. 39).

In the original 1922 road numberings, A491 was assigned to the Shrewsbury, Welshpool, Mallwyd and Cemmaes Road route, now part of the A458 and A470. The route between Wall Heath and Bromsgrove was assigned the A449 number.

== Route ==
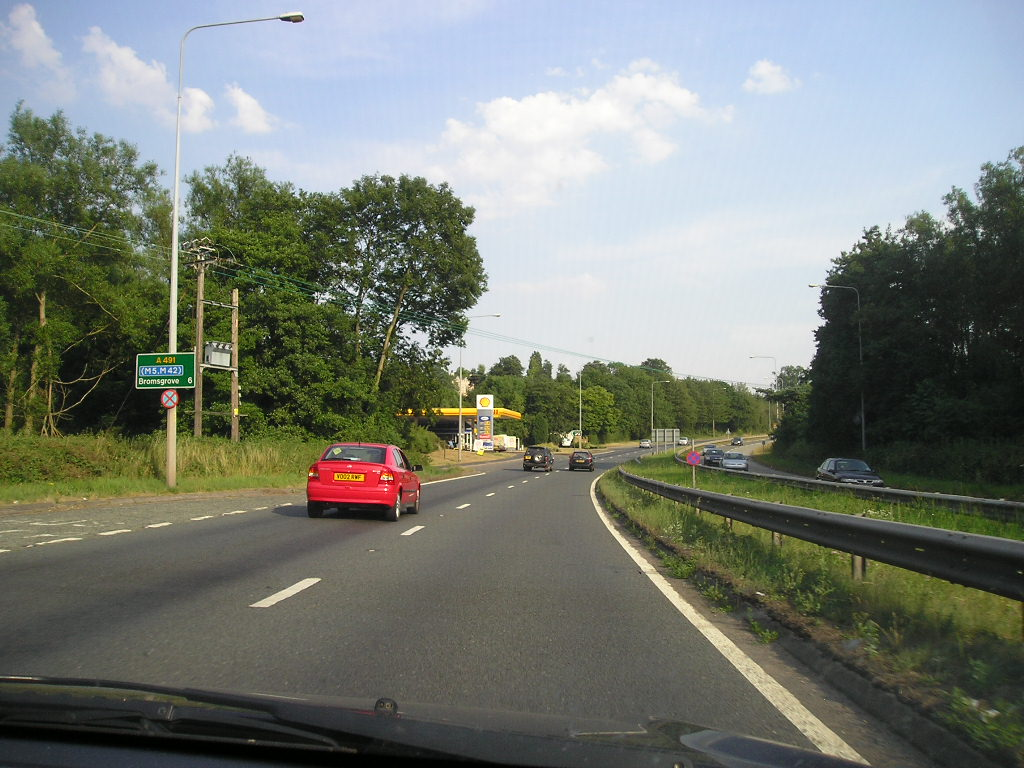
The dual carriageway near Fairfield, Worcestershire

=== Lydiate Ash – Stourbridge ===
Starting at junction 4 of the M5, the road heads West on a single carriageway alignment, meeting the B4091 at a roundabout, then becoming a dual carriageway. There are local accesses for the villages of Belbroughton, Clent, Romsley and Holy Cross. Following a roundabout in Hagley the A491 is concurrent with the A456 for a short period before heading north towards Stourbridge. At Pedmore the A4036 leaves at a roundabout towards Dudley. The former northern section of the A450 (now B4187) from Worcester joins from the left. The A491 then continues to join the Stourbridge ring road. The one-way ring road forms part of the A491 and is concurrent with the A458 and forms the starting point of the A451 to Kidderminster.

=== Stourbridge – Wall Heath ===
The original route of the A491 resumes on the northern side of the Stourbridge ring road. This final section is entirely single carriageway, apart from a short distance between the staggered junction with the A461, in an urban environment causing major delays. The road passes through Amblecote, Wordsley and Kingswinford, passing numerous traffic light controlled junctions including those with the A4101 and B4175, before terminating on the A449 at a roundabout just north of Wall Heath.

== Former routes ==
=== Bypasses and realignments ===
- Holy Cross, Clent (Now bypassed by a dual carriageway to the North). A cutting through Button Hill, in Holy Cross—through which the road used to pass–was finished in 1834. It was built by men from Lye and Stourbridge during a local recession as a form of poor relief.
- Stourbridge Town Centre (Traffic now uses the ring road)

=== Downgrading ===
- Fairfield – Finstall (Part of this route is now B4091, A448 and unclassified)
