= M50 motorway (England) =

Motorway in England

M50
- M50 highlighted in blue
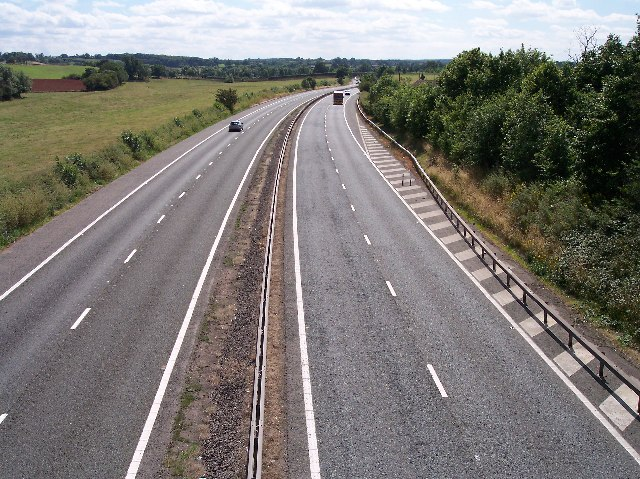
- Looking south-west towards Wales, 2005

Route information
- Maintained by National Highways
- Length: 21.6 mi (34.8 km)
- Existed: 1960–present
- History: Constructed 1958–62

Major junctions
- East end: Strensham
- M5 motorway
- West end: Ross-on-Wye

Section 1
- Major intersections: A449 road

Location
- Country: United Kingdom

Road network
- Roads in the United Kingdom; Motorways; A and B road zones
← M49	→ M53

The M50 is a motorway in Worcestershire, Gloucestershire, and Herefordshire, England. Sometimes referred to as the Ross Spur, it is a 22 miles (35 km) connection of the M5 motorway to a point near Ross-on-Wye, where it joins the A40 road continuing westward into Wales. The motorway was fully opened in 1962.

== Route ==
The M50 runs between junction 8 of the M5 motorway, 4 miles (6.4 km) NNE of Tewkesbury on the Gloucestershire-Worcestershire border; and the junction with the A449, the A40 and the A465 ("Heads of the Valleys Road") taking traffic into South Wales.

Leaving the M5 at junction 8, it passes north of Tewkesbury then south of Ledbury. Between junctions 1 and 2 chiefly for these towns respectively, it crosses the River Severn on the Queenhill Bridge and Viaduct over the flood plain. After passing north of Newent, the motorway terminates at junction 4.

== History ==
M50 under construction in 1960
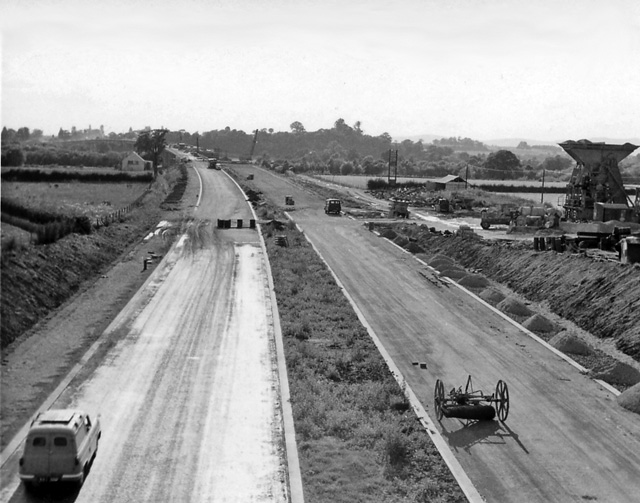
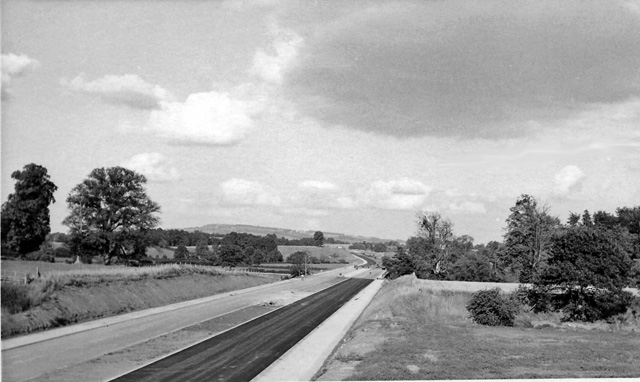

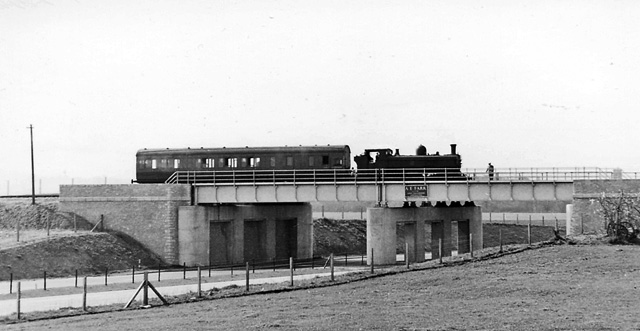
A train using the newly constructed viaduct on the Tewkesbury and Malvern railway – the line was to be dismantled a few years later

The construction works for the M50 were let under four contracts:

- Contract 1 was awarded to Tarmac Construction
- Contracts 2 and 3 were awarded to R M Douglas Construction
- Contract 4 was awarded to A E Farr Ltd

Both contracts were undertaken between 1958 and 1962:

On 3 March 1958, Harold Watkinson, the Minister of Transport and Civil Aviation fired a starting flare during the inauguration ceremony in Herefordshire to signal the start of construction of the M50. Junctions 1 to 4 opened in 1960 and the section between the M5 to junction 1 opened in 1962.

The route forms a strategic (that is, trunk or main) route from the Midlands and northern Britain to South Wales (also including the A449 and A40 and so was constructed as an early priority.) It is one of the few British motorways not to have been widened, instead retaining its original layout of two lanes in each direction.

=== Murder of Marie Wilks ===
In 1988, a woman was abducted from the hard shoulder of the M50 and found murdered three miles further up the motorway.

== Junctions ==
Data from driver location signs are used to provide distance and carriageway identifier information.

M50 motorway junctions
mile	km	Eastbound exits (B carriageway)	Junction	Westbound exits (A carriageway)	Coordinates
0.0	0.0	The Midlands, Worcester, Birmingham, The South West, Tewkesbury, Bristol M5	M5, J8; Terminus	Start of motorway	52.0477°N 2.1355°W
1.7	2.8	Tewkesbury A38	J1	Malvern A38	
10.9	17.5	Gloucester A417	J2	Ledbury A417 Hereford (A438)	
18.0	28.9	Newent B4221	J3	Newent B4221	
21.6	34.7	Start of motorway	J4; Terminus	South Wales, Monmouth, Ledbury, Ross-on-Wye A449	51.9302°N 2.5623°W
1.000 mi = 1.609 km; 1.000 km = 0.621 mi

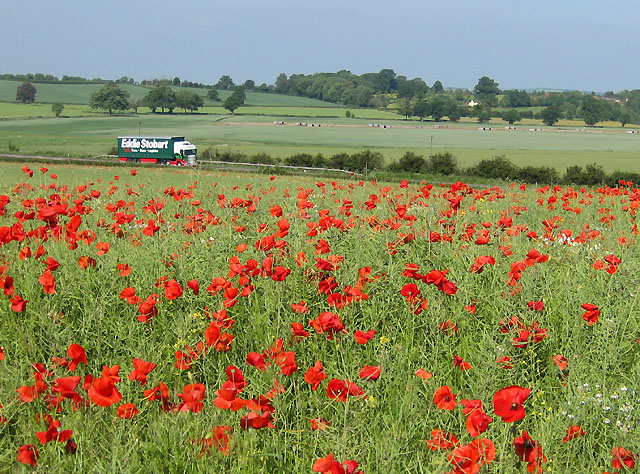
In Herefordshire the road passes cultivated fields and pastures

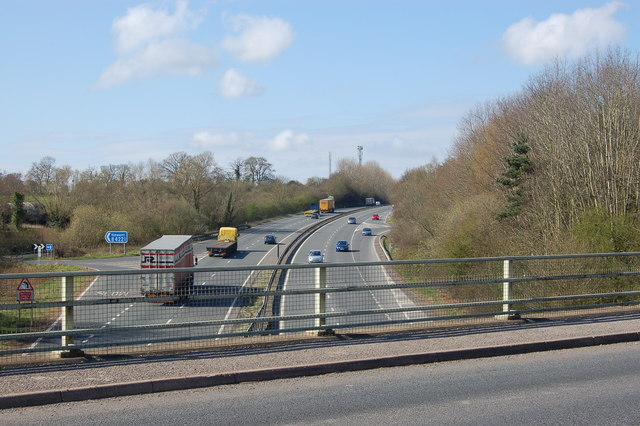
The minor Junction 3 exits, viewed from the adjoining minor road bridge

=== Services ===
After both ends of the M50 are motorway service stations:

- Strensham services operated by RoadChef, north of the M50's northeastern terminus at junction 8 of the M5.
- Esso garage on the combined short section of the A449 road and A40 remains westbound.

==== History ====
Instead of the latter, beyond junction 4 was a larger Ross Spur Services operated by Welcome Break which closed in the 2000s.

=== Descriptions ===
The starting junction (junction 8 of the M5) was originally a free-flowing trumpet-style, then converted to a roundabout with M5 flyover when the M5 was widened in the 1990s. Junction 1, where the M50 meets the A38, is a partial cloverleaf. Junction 2 has full slips roads from the deceleration lane into the slip roads save the kinked eastbound exit to local roads. Junction 3 consists of dual-carriageway-style 90° exits due to cost, low traffic volume and the style of road; however this has been the scene of various accidents.

The long disused railway bridge over the motorway which carried the Tewkesbury and Malvern Railway was dismantled in 2012 and donated to the Bluebell Railway.

== See also ==
- List of motorways in the United Kingdom
- Murder of Melanie Hall – another unsolved murder of a woman who, similarly to Marie Wilks, was found dead by the nearby and conjoining M5 motorway
