= A459 road =

Road in the West Midlands

A459

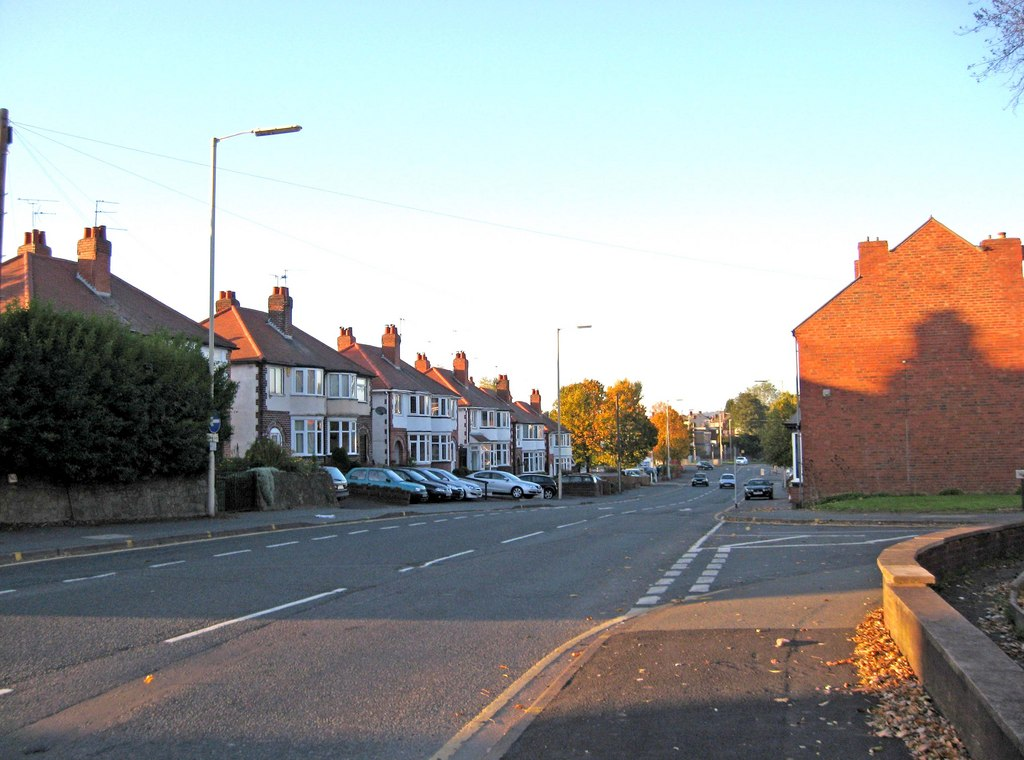
- A459 in Halesowen Town Centre

Route information
- Maintained by Metropolitan Borough of Dudley and Wolverhampton City Council
- Length: 19 mi (31 km)

Major junctions
- South end: Halesowen; 52.4443265°N 2.044534°W and 52.4473798°N 2.0525263°W
- A456; A458; A4099; A4100; A461; A4037; A4168; A457; A463; A4123
- North end: Wolverhampton; 52.5781279°N 2.1255383°W

Location
- Country: United Kingdom
- Primary destinations: Halesowen; Cradley Heath; Dudley; Wolverhampton

Road network
- Roads in the United Kingdom; Motorways; A and B road zones
← A458	→ A460

The A459 is a main road in the West Midlands of England, which runs from Halesowen to Wolverhampton City Centre. Is also a primary route connecting Wolverhampton and Dudley.

== Route ==
=== Halesowen–Dudley ===
The road begins at a roundabout south of Halesowen with the A456 and the B4551. It starts as Grange Road and passes Halesowen Cricket Club as it runs slightly east of the town centre. It then meets the A458 and the road continues to run north of Halesowen College meeting the A4099 in the village Coombeswood. It then passes Haden Hill Parks and runs through Cradley Heath where it meets the A4100 in the town centre.

As the road leaves Cradley Heath Town Centre and begins to head north towards Dudley and Wolverhampton, it runs through the centre of Netherton and meets the B4173. Finally, the road passes the northeast edge of the Saltwells Nature Reserve and runs into Dudley Town Centre.

=== Dudley–Wolverhampton ===
Entering into Dudley Town Centre, the road becomes concurrent with the A461 at Blowers Green as Duncan Edwards Way: the main dual-carriageway through the town. It then resumes heading north at a junction with the A4037 and meets the B4171 (the original route of the A461) and passes Dudley Zoo & Castle. Then, the road passes Priory Park and Dudley College, and also meets the A4168. It then begins to head towards Sedgley as The Broadway and meets the B4588 on its way. The road then passes the villages Upper Gornal, Ruiton and Woodsetton before running through Sedgley where it meets the A457 and A463. The road then passes Sedgley Park and enters into Wolverhampton. It runs parallel to the A4123 passing Ettingshall Park and Phoenix Park before signage indicates the road terminates at the junction with Grove Street, part of the A4123 Gyratory route created with the construction of Ring Road St. George's.

=== Former Sections ===
Previously the A459 continued to Wolverhampton Ring Road (and is still shown as such on some maps) but road signs in the area indicate this to no longer be the case. Until the 1980s the A459 continued to Five Ways terminating on the A449 and running via Snow Hill, Garrick Street, Princess Street and Stafford Street. Until the late 1960s the A459 ran down Snow Hill and Dudley Street ending in Queen Square.
