= A460 road =

Road in the West Midlands

A460

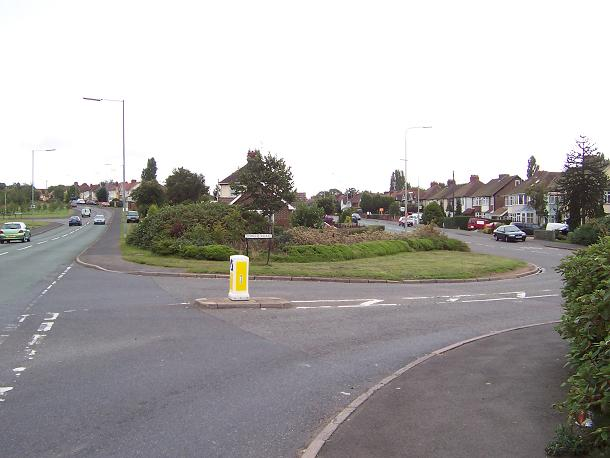
- The A460 in Cannock, Staffordshire.

Route information
- Length: 17.1 mi (27.5 km)

Major junctions
- Southwest end: Wolverhampton
- M54 J1; M6 J11; M6 Toll T8; A449; A462; A5; A34; A4601; A5190; A51
- Northeast end: Rugeley

Location
- Country: United Kingdom
- Primary destinations: Wolverhampton; Cannock; Hednesford; Rugeley

Road network
- Roads in the United Kingdom; Motorways; A and B road zones
← A459	→ A461

The A460 is a main road in the Midlands of England. It runs from Wolverhampton in the West Midlands to Rugeley in Staffordshire. It is also a primary road linking Wolverhampton and Cannock with the M54, M6 and M6 Toll.

== Route ==
=== Wolverhampton – Cannock ===
The road begins at the Elephant and Castle Junction with the A449 in Wolverhampton City Centre (although it originally began in Princes Square). The junction is named after a pub which once stood at the junction and was controversially demolished overnight. The A460 begins as Cannock Road and passes a Home Bargains and an Iceland Foods at Phoenix Retail Park. It then heads northeast towards the outskirts of the city passing Springfield and Fallings Park. It passes a McDonald's and then meets B4156 to form the Scotlands Roundabout. It then passes Wood Hayes and leaves Wolverhampton entering into Staffordshire. It becomes the main road through the hamlet of Westcroft and then runs to the west of Essington. The road then meets the M54 at Junction 1 and passes Featherstone and Shareshill. Then it meets the A462 and M6 at Junction 11. This is where it makes the primary road for people travelling northeast and southwest between the two motorways. The amount of traffic travelling along the A460 between the two motorways has led to the government announcing that they will create a new link road between the M6 and the M54 avoiding the current A460 route.

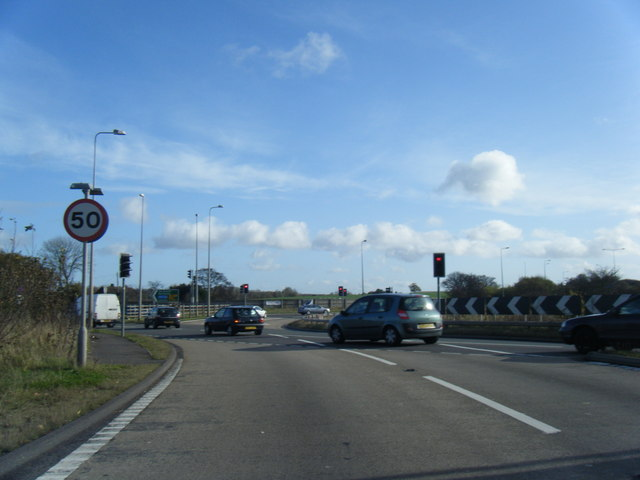
A460 at Junction 11 of the M6

At Junction 11, the road heads towards Cannock as Wolverhampton Road. It enters into Saredon at a roundabout with Tollbooth 8 of the M6 Toll and the A4601, which was the original route of the A460 through Cannock Town Centre. Prior to construction of the M6 Toll the A460 used the single carriageway road running to the east of the current dual carriageway which continued onto the present A4601. The road heads east from the roundabout as Lodge Lane and is parallel to the M6 Toll. It then meets the A5 and A34 entering into Cannock.

=== Cannock – Rugeley ===
The A460 begins to head towards Rugeley into Cannock passing Orbital Retail Park and Designer Outlet West Midlands as Eastern Way. It meets the A5190 and then passes a McDonald's and a Texaco as it runs through Hawks Green. It then begins to run further northeast as Old Hednesford Road as it meets the north end of the A4601 and passes a KFC. It then runs to Hill Top Roundabout as East Cannock Road passing a Texaco and The Plough and Harrow pub. It then becomes Uxbridge Street and runs through Hednesford. Then it leaves the town as Rugeley Road and heads into Cannock Chase.

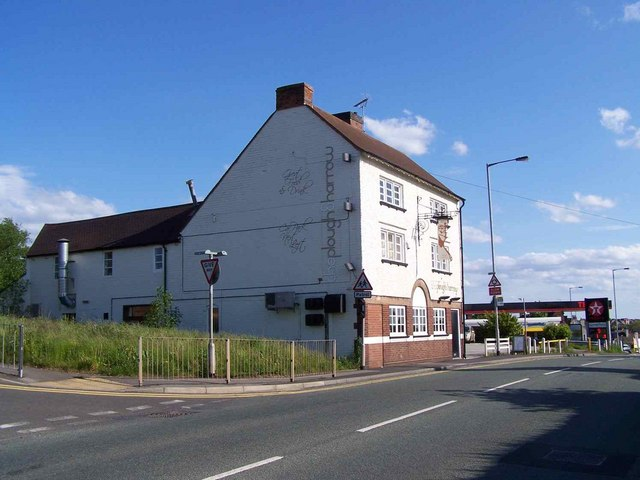
The Plough and Harrow Pub on the A460 in Hednesford

The A460 runs directly through Cannock Chase and becomes the primary road linking Cannock and Rugeley. It becomes the Hednesford Road and runs directly into Rugeley Town Centre, passing Peartree Estate and meeting the B5013 near Elmore Park. It passes through the town centre as Western Springs Road, then becomes Wolseley Road past the Stag's Leap pub, and then terminates at the A51 north of the town.
