= A4123 road =

Road in England

A4123

Route information
- Length: 12 mi (19 km)
- History: Construction completed 1927

Major junctions
- Northwest end: Wolverhampton Ring Road; 52.579389°N 2.125453°W
- A4150 A4039 A463 A457 A461 A4034; M5 Jnc. 2 A456 A4040
- Southeast end: Harborne, Birmingham; 52.458971°N 1.963203°W

Location
- Country: United Kingdom
- Primary destinations: Birmingham, Dudley, Wolverhampton

Road network
- Roads in the United Kingdom; Motorways; A and B road zones

The A4123, is a major road in the West Midlands of the UK linking Wolverhampton with Birmingham via Dudley, also known as the Birmingham New Road (Wolverhampton to Dudley) and Wolverhampton Road (Dudley to Birmingham). It was one of the first major new roads constructed for use by motor traffic, and was designed as an unemployment relief project. It runs roughly northwest to southeast from the Wolverhampton Ring Road via Dudley to Harborne, west Birmingham.Until the 1960s, the road continued along the former B4123 to the A441 near Kings Norton. This became part of the A4040 during the 1960s when the Outer Ring Road came into existence.

Construction of the road began on 4 February 1924, and was built in individual sections. The route went through Bury Hill Park in Rounds Green, which resulted in the park lodge and refreshment rooms having to be demolished and rebuilt. It provided jobs for at least 470 unemployed workers in surrounding areas including Birmingham, Wolverhampton, Dudley, West Bromwich, Smethwick and Oldbury. It was opened by the then Prince of Wales (later Edward VIII of the United Kingdom) on 2 November 1927.

The road has previously been a Trunk Road (looked after by the Highways Agency), but was detrunked on 13 November 2008.

National Express West Midlands services 8 and X8 serve the majority of the A4123 from Wolverhampton to Dudley while National Express West Midlands service 126 serves the section from Dudley to Birmingham (Hagley Road).
