= A456 road =

Road in the West Midlands

A456

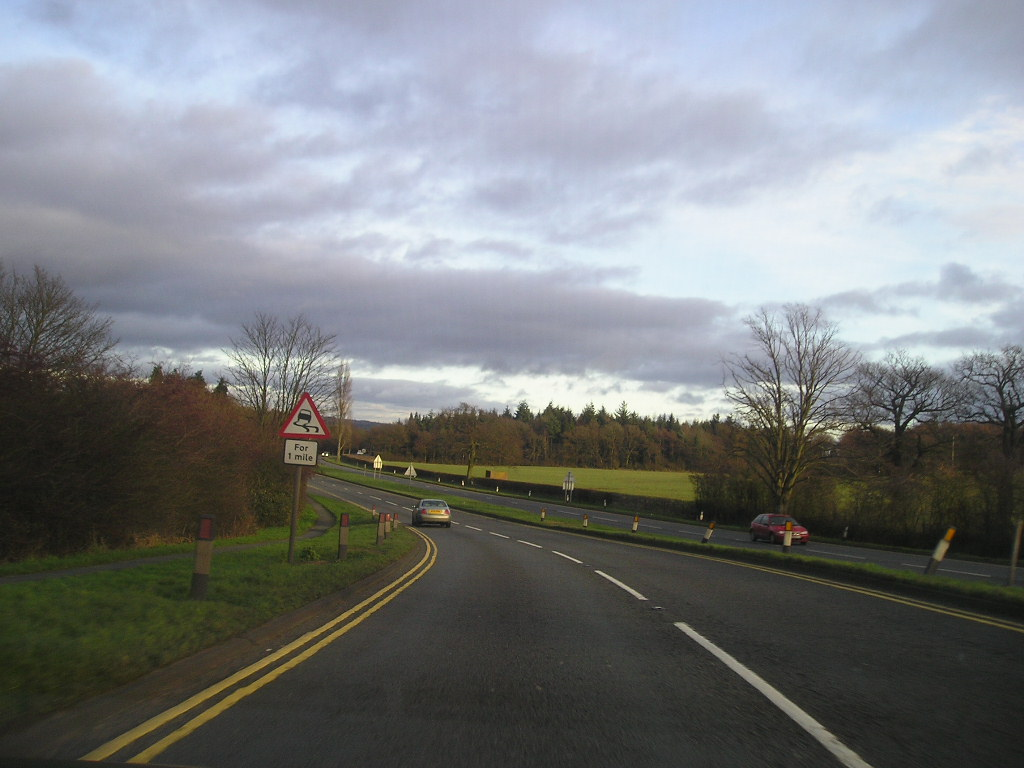
- The A456 passing near Clent Hills

Route information
- Length: 40 mi (64 km)

Major junctions
- East end: Birmingham
- A38 A457 A4540 A4030 A4123 A458; M5 J3 A459 A491 A450 A449 A451 A442 A4535 A4117 A443 A4112; A49
- West end: Woofferton

Location
- Country: United Kingdom
- Primary destinations: Birmingham Kidderminster Leominster

Road network
- Roads in the United Kingdom; Motorways; A and B road zones

Known as the Hagley Road in Birmingham, the A456 is a main road in England running between Central Birmingham and Woofferton, Shropshire, south of Ludlow. Some sections of the route, for example Edgbaston near Bearwood, are also the route of the Elan Aqueduct which carries Birmingham's water supply from the Elan Valley.

== Route ==
=== Birmingham–Kidderminster ===
The A456 now starts on Hagley Road at Five Ways junction on the Middleway (A4540) in Birmingham. It previously started at the Paradise Circus junction with the former Inner Ring Road (A4400) but originally ran along New Street in the city centre. Heading West through the Birmingham suburbs of Edgbaston and Quinton using a mixture of dual carriageway and single carriageway roads, though maintaining at least 2 lanes in each direction. Just beyond Quinton, the A458 exits towards Halesowen, while the A456 bypasses the town to the South, meeting the M5 at Junction 3. This route was completed in the 1960s, beginning with Quinton Expressway and resuming beyond the motorway junction as Manor Way (the Halesowen By-Pass). Part of the historic Staffordshire/Worcestershire border runs along the road by Lightwoods Park, and today this is the boundary between Birmingham City Council and the Metropolitan Borough of Sandwell.

The road resumes its original route on the West side of Halesowen, entering Worcestershire and passing over the Clent Hills. The A491 is crossed in the village of Hagley, where the road becomes single carriageway once more, passing through the village, closely followed by the village of Blakedown. Beyond there a dual carriageway section takes the road to Kidderminster, crossing the A449, before following the town's Ring Road to the North side.

=== Kidderminster–Woofferton ===
Now on the West side of Kidderminster, the road passes the General Hospital before leaving the town and passing the West Midland Safari Park. The next town of Bewdley is now bypassed by a single carriageway road to the South and West, this road being completed in 1987. Just after Bewdley the A4117 road (to Cleobury Mortimer) begins at the Fingerpost junction with the A456. Continuing West, the road is entirely rural in nature, passing the Wyre Forest eventually meeting the A443 at a "T" junction. The road passes just to the North of Tenbury Wells, the A4112 providing access to the town, and then through the village of Little Hereford (therefore passing briefly through Herefordshire). Between Newnham Bridge and Burford the road enters Shropshire, and then enters Herefordshire for about the same distance, before entering Shropshire again at its junction with the A49. The A456 terminates shortly after on the A49 in Woofferton.

== History ==
Much of the road is almost certainly medieval in origin. However, the road was laid out, essentially in its present form (except where there are modern bypasses) by a series of 18th century turnpike trusts.

=== Birmingham–Blakedown ===
From Birmingham to Blakedown section was the responsibility of one trust established in 1753 to improve roads from the market house in Stourbridge. Blakedown was then part of Hagley, giving rise to the name for it of "Hagley Road". Sections of the route have had other names. For example, the 1903 Ordnance Survey map shows the name "Beech Lane" by Lightwoods House west of Bearwood, and the area south of Hagley Road between Lordswood Road and Wolverhampton Road is still referred to as "Beech Lanes".

=== Blakedown–Bewdley Bridge ===
The section from Blakedown to Bewdley Bridge represents two of the eight roads from the market house in Kidderminster that were maintained by a trust established in 1759. The turnpike road passed through Halesowen, following what is now A458 road and B4183 to Hayley Green. Halesowen was bypassed around the south of the town in the 1950s due to rising traffic levels and the growth of the town, and Manor Lane became part of A456. Then in the 1970s, the Quinton Expressway was opened to connect with M5 motorway junction 3, when the northern section of M5 was opened in the 1970s.

=== Bewdley – Newnham Bridge ===
From the Welsh Gate of Bewdley to Newnham Bridge, it was managed by the Bewdley Trust established in 1753. From Monksbridge (the Shropshire boundary, to Woofferton and so to Ludlow, the road was repaired by the Ludlow First Turnpike Trust of about 1751. The intervening section was handled by the Hundred House Turnpike Trust of 1753. The Hundred House at Great Witley was probably the meeting place for Doddingtree Hundred. This trust was unusual in being responsible for several roads radiating from a place that was not a town.

=== Bypasses and Realignments ===
- Bewdley (Bypassed in the late 1980s, now B4190)
- Halesowen (Former route now A458 and B4183)
- Kidderminster (Now follows the route of the Ring Road rather than through the town centre)

== Notable places ==
- Birmingham Oratory, Edgbaston
- West Midlands Safari Park
- Severn Valley Railway
- Wyre Forest
- River Teme

== Water crossings ==
The road crosses a number of water coursesalong its route, both natural and human-made. Traveling eastbound, one will cross Gosford Brook, River Teme, Ledwyche Brook, Corn Brook, River Rea, River Severn, River Stour, (in both Kidderminster and Halesowen), the Staffordshire and Worcestershire Canal, the Elan Aqueduct and the BCN Main Line, along with many other smaller streams and brooks.

== In popular culture ==
John Combe's 2008 book Get Your Kicks on the A456 (ISBN 0-9550482-0-6) documents the contributions made by musicians from the Kidderminster and Wyre Forest areas to pop and rock music between the mid-1950s and the 1970s, with reference to bands such as Chicken Shack and Led Zeppelin.
