= A441 road =

Road in the West Midlands

Coordinates: 52.3493°N 1.9510°W

A441

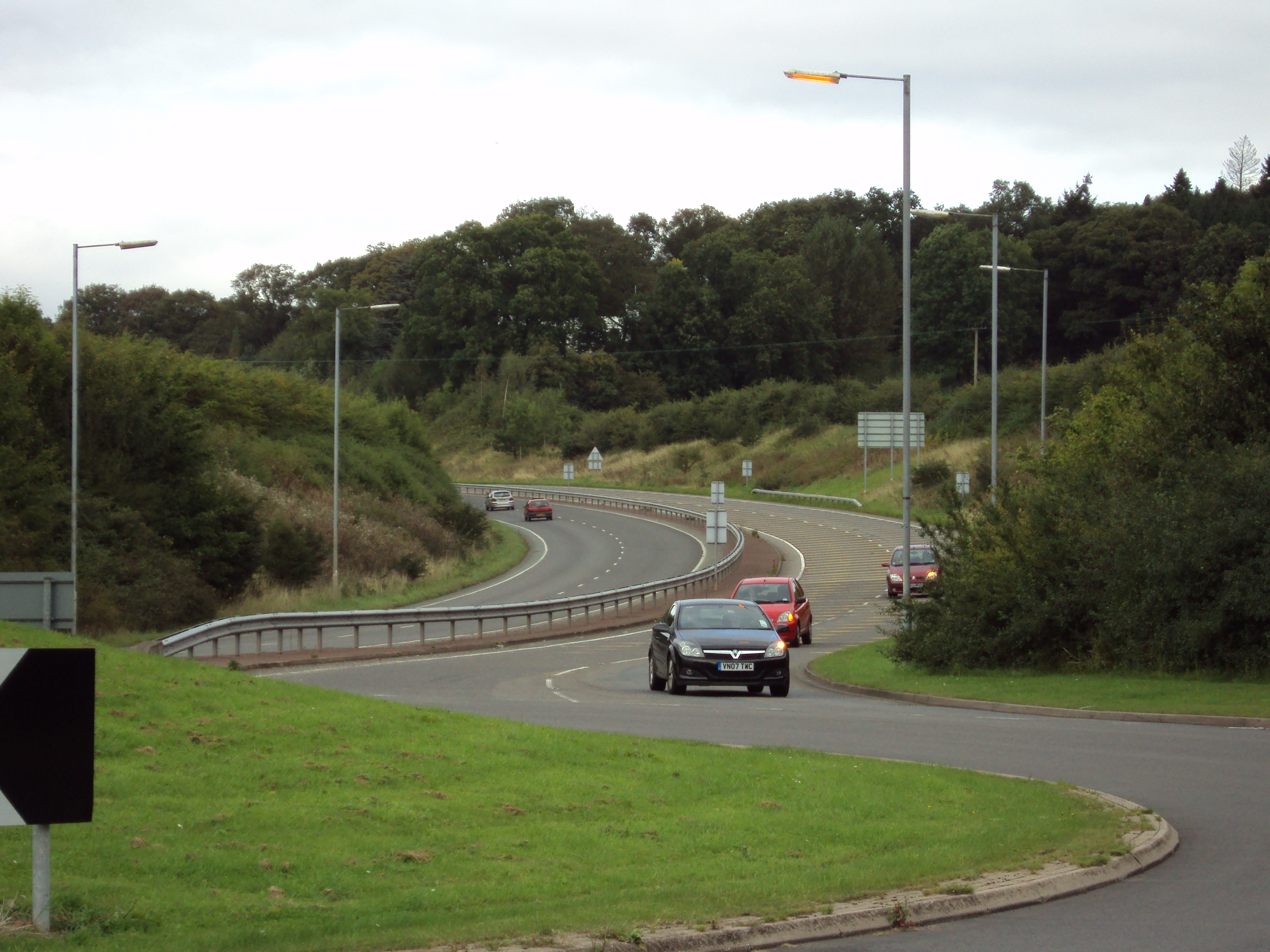
- Looking north up the A441 Alvechurch Bypass from the roundabout at the junction of the A441 and B4120 roads between Alvechurch and Bordesley, Worcestershire, England.

Route information
- Length: 20 mi (32 km)

Major junctions
- North end: Birmingham
- M42 Junction 2 A4540 A4040 A4023 A448 A4189 A442
- South end: Cookhill

Location
- Country: United Kingdom
- Primary destinations: Redditch

Road network
- Roads in the United Kingdom; Motorways; A and B road zones
← A439	→ A442

A441 is an A-road in England which runs from central Birmingham to Cookhill, Worcestershire.

== Route ==
The A441 starts on the A4540 The Middleway in Birmingham as a non primary route, running largely parallel to the A38. It passes Calthorpe Park and the suburbs of Selly Park, Stirchley, Cotteridge, Kings Norton and West Heath before leaving the West Midlands and entering Worcestershire. The village of Alvechurch is bypassed to the East, connecting with the M42 at junction 2, where there is a service station. Upon entering Redditch the A441 follows new town dual carriageway roads built in the early to mid-1970s including a short concurrence with the A448 where it gains primary status. Heading Southwards out of Redditch the former road is rejoined and it passes through the village of Astwood Bank before finally terminating at a staggered junction with the A422 (although the A441 takes priority at the junction) South of Cookhill, just short of the Warwickshire border.

== History ==
Once one of the main routes between Evesham, Redditch and Birmingham, the A441 has now largely been superseded by A435 which has been upgraded to the East. Redditch was designated a new town in 1964, with this came major realignments of the major routes, including the A441, rebuilt to dual carriageway standard through the town. When the M42 was built in 1982, a link road was built from the A441 at Hopwood to a new junction East of Alvechurch. This later formed part of the Alvechurch bypass when completed in the 1990s. The final section of the road between Cookhill and Dunnington was downgraded in 1995.

=== Former Routes ===
==== Bypasses and Realignments ====
- Alvechurch (Bypassed in the 1990s)
- Redditch (Realigned onto new roads when the New Town was built)

==== Downgrading ====
- Cookhill – Dunnington. The A441 is now the B4088, it used to meet the A435 at Dunnington
