= M42 motorway =

Motorway in England

M42
- M42 highlighted in blue
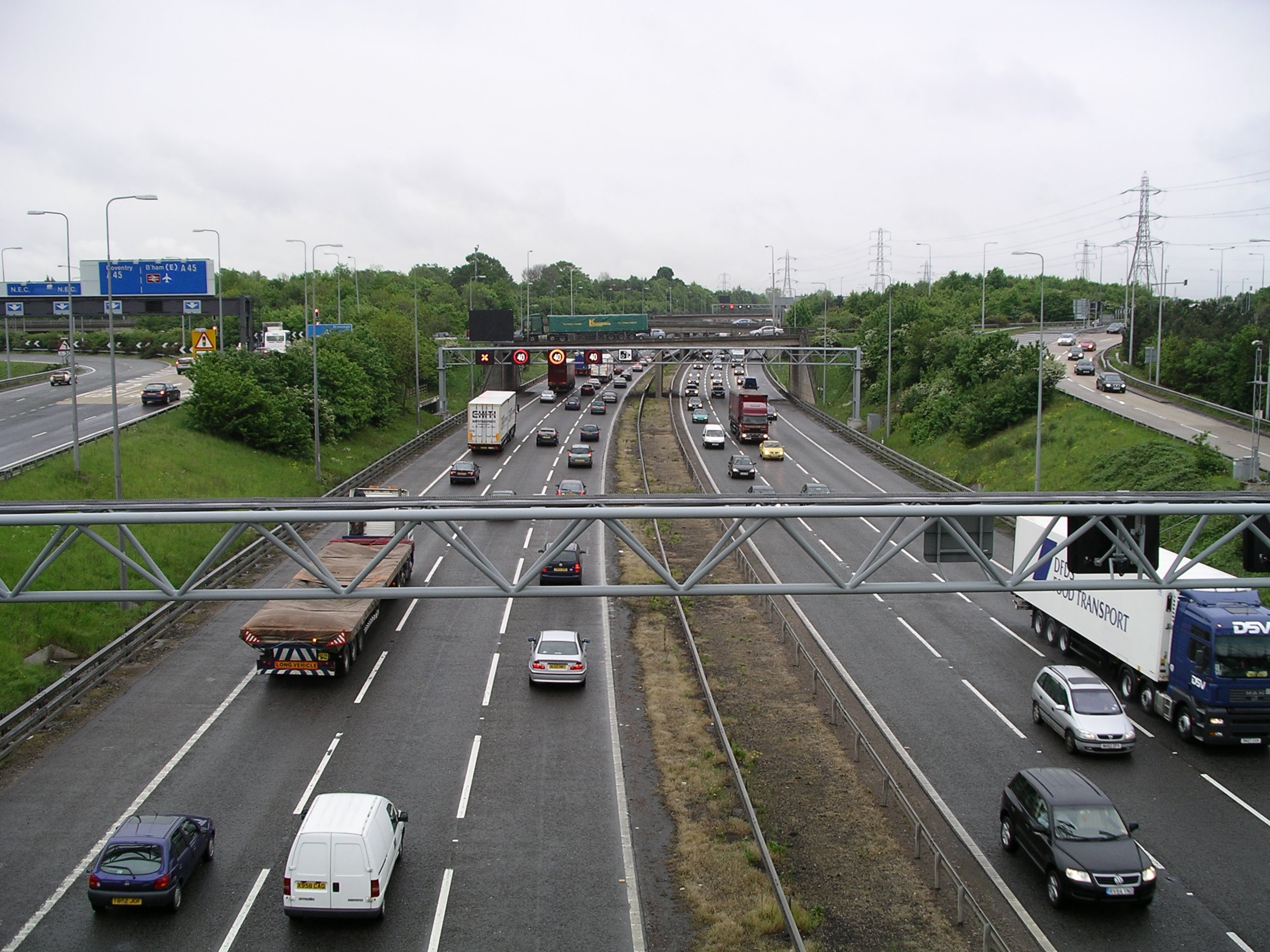
- The M42 from a bridge just east of the M42/A45, looking south towards junction 6, 2007

Route information
- Part of E05
- Maintained by National Highways
- Length: 40.0 mi (64.4 km)
- Existed: 1976–present
- History: Opened: 1976; Completed: 1989

Major junctions
- Southwest end: Catshill
- M5 motorway J3a → M40 motorway J6 -> A45 road J7 → M6 motorway M6 Toll J10 -> A5 road
- Northeast end: A42 Appleby Magna

Location
- Country: United Kingdom
- Counties: Worcestershire, Warwickshire, West Midlands, Leicestershire
- Primary destinations: Bromsgrove; Solihull; Birmingham Airport; Tamworth

Road network
- Roads in the United Kingdom; Motorways; A and B road zones

A42
- A42 highlighted in green
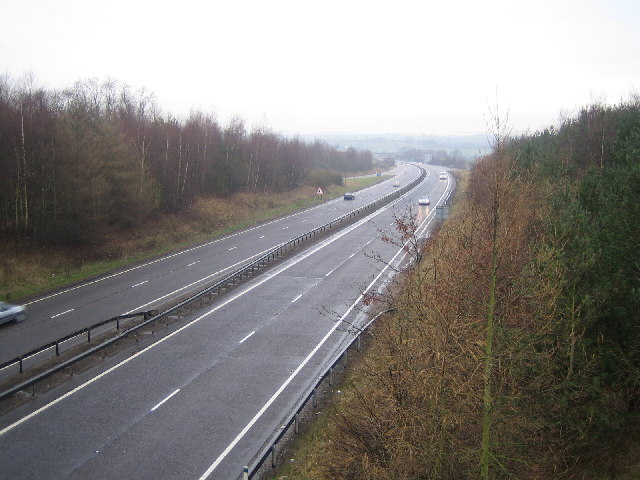
- A42(T), looking west from A423

Route information
- Maintained by National Highways
- Length: 15 mi (24 km)
- History: Completed in 1989

Major junctions
- Northeast end: M1 motorway Kegworth; 52.8235°N 1.3047°W
- J14 → A453 road / J13 → A511 road/A512 road

- Southwest end: / M42 motorway/A444 road Appleby Magna; 52.6854°N 1.5499°W

Location
- Country: United Kingdom
- Constituent country: England
- Counties: Leicestershire
- Primary destinations: East Midlands Airport

Road network
- Roads in the United Kingdom; Motorways; A and B road zones
← A41	→ A43

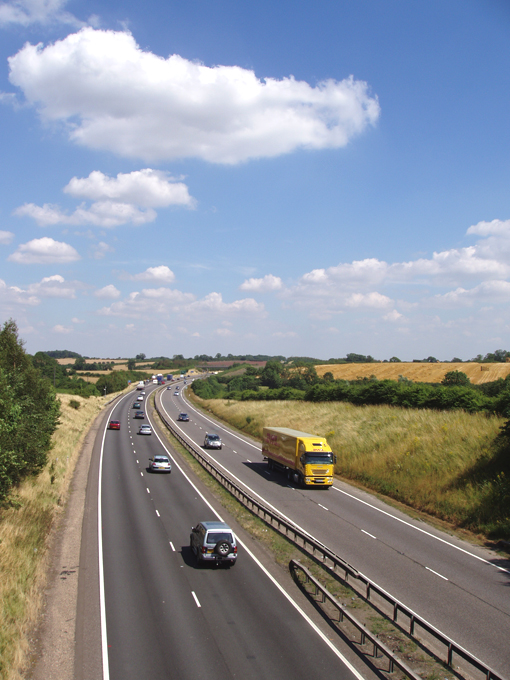
Looking north bound towards restricted junction 14.

The M42 motorway runs north-east from Bromsgrove in Worcestershire to just south-west of Ashby-de-la-Zouch in Leicestershire, passing Redditch, Solihull, the National Exhibition Centre (NEC) and Tamworth on the way, serving the east of the Birmingham metropolitan area. The section between the M40 and junction 4 of the M6 forms – though unsigned as such – a part of Euroroute E05. Northwards beyond junction 11, the route is continued as the A42; the junctions on this section, 12–14, are numbered like a continuation of the motorway, but the road has non-motorway status from here.

== Planning ==
A new motorway route from the M5 in Worcestershire to the M1 near Nottingham was announced in May 1966 in Nottingham, as a cheaper scheme than to upgrade the A453 piecemeal.

The motorway would join the M1 at Lockington in Leicestershire, and to join the M5 at Rashwood in Worcestershire. The motorway would be 54-mile-long (87 km), and was planned by five counties. The A42 would later terminate at Lockington.

Firm plans for a new motorway by-passing the south and east of Birmingham, reaching Tamworth and connecting the M5 and M6 motorways, were announced in 1972. The public enquiry for the Bromsgrove section took place in June 1973, also with the proposed Warwick section of the M40.

In March 1976, it was decided to reduce the Curdworth to Appleby section from three to two lanes, and to scrap motorway status. Breedon-on-the-Hill wanted the M42 to be built.

== Construction ==
=== Monkspath to Coleshill ===
The route of the 8-mile (13 km) section was published in March 1971.

Construction of this section, began in late February 1975. R M Douglas planned to build the section by early 1977, but it opened three months early on 8 November 1976. It linked Birmingham Airport with the M6 motorway.

=== Coleshill to Curdworth ===
This is the section from the M6 with the A5 at Tamworth. Construction began in December 1983. Alfred McAlpine built the first six miles to the A5 in concrete. Leonard Fairclough & Son built the section from the A5 to Curdworth in asphalt. Six miles, which cost £40 million, opened, from Coleshill to Polesworth, on 18 December 1985 by Lynda Chalker. The motorway was now 25 miles (40 km).

The section from the A5 at Tamworth with the A444 at Measham opened in 1986. The 8-mile (13 km) Polesworth North and South sections were opened on 7 August 1986 by Malcolm Sinclair, 20th Earl of Caithness.

=== Portway to Monkspath ===
The southern section of the motorway to Alvechurch just north of Redditch to form a junction with the A441, the curve around the south-eastern side of Solihull opened in September 1985 by Nicholas Ridley. The section cost £17 million, from A34 to the A435, being four months late. Construction had started in April 1983.

=== Lickey End to Portway ===
In 1986, the section to the A38 at Bromsgrove, 15 miles (24 km) south of Birmingham was completed. The section to the A38 at Lickey End, in Worcestershire, opened on 5 June 1986, from the A435 to A38, with a cavalcade of vintage buses.

=== Catshill to Lickey End ===
In December 1981, the additional section through the Lickey Hills was cancelled. In 1987, the motorway was completed with the opening of the link from the M5. The section, which cost £43 millionm, was opened on 19 March 1987 by the Transport Secretary John Moore. This completed the Catshill to Monkspath section.

== History ==
A planned section north of the M6 running to the M1 near Nottingham was never constructed as planned being replaced by the A42 link, a trunk road which was completed in August 1989 to link with the M1 motorway near Nottingham. The A42 is built to a similar standard to the M42, being a grade separated dual carriageway. The 6-mile (9.7 km) Measham and Ashby-de-la-Zouch bypass section was opened in August 1989 at a cost of £33m. The original planned line of the M42 saw it joining the M1 further to the north, crossing what is now the A50 Derby Southern Bypass and meeting the M1 north of Bardills Island (A52/M1 interchange).

When first built, there was no direct connection between the M5 South and M42. Westbound M42 traffic similarly had no direct connection to the M5 North. Instead traffic had to use the A38 between M5 junction 4 and M42 junction 1.

=== Operational history ===
Junction 3a was remodelled to give priority to traffic operating between the now westbound section of the M42 and the extended M40 motorway, which opened in stages between December 1989 and January 1991.

The section of the M42 between junctions 7A and 9 was re-built as part of the M6 Toll works and now forms the link between the M6 and the southern end of the toll road. The M6 Toll opened in 2003.

Active Traffic Management with hard shoulder running and variable speed limits were introduced in 2006.

Since the 1990s, there have been constant plans to build a new service station on the motorway south of Birmingham Airport and the NEC, but this has yet to be built. In 2019 Solihull Planning Committee rejected two plans to build a new service station near junction 4 or next to junction 5. However, in 2022 the Planning Inspector approved plans to allow the plans to proceed at the junction 5 scheme, subject to the road being a full ALM Smart Motorway which is currently not on plan to take place due to the cancellation of new Smart Motorways in 2023.

The route passes No Man's Heath, Warwickshire; next door is Mercia Park, next to the end of M42, in Stretton en le Field. It was 17 miles from the M6 to the Leicestershire terminus.

=== History of the road number ===
The current road is the second incarnation of the A42. The original (1923) route was Reading to Birmingham via Oxford. The whole road was renumbered in 1935 – the section from Reading to Shillingford became part of the A329, Shillingford to Oxford became part of the A423 and Oxford to Birmingham became part of the A34. In 1993 the A423 was itself renumbered, with the section formerly the A42 becoming part of the A4074 from Reading to Oxford. The modern M42 does interchange with the former A42 at junction 4 near Solihull: Stratford Road now being numbered A34 to the north of the junction and A3400 to the south.

=== Former route to Trowell Moor ===
On 8 September 1972 Graham Page announced the last 23.8 miles, the Appleby Magna to Trowell Moor section.

The 1972 route to Trowell would pass between Donisthorpe and Oakthorpe, to the east of Norris Hill and Blackfordby, have a roundabout interchange with the A50 (now A511) at Annwell Place, follow due north to the west of Smisby, go through Sharp's Bottom Wood, to the east of Smith's Gorse Wood, following the B5006 close to the west of Ticknall, follow north-east through Robin Wood to the west of Melbourne, Derbyshire, on a 13-foot embankment pass close to the east of Stanton by Bridge, cross north-east around five miles across the Trent floodplain to a roundabout interchange with the A6 at Thulston, cross north-east the Derwent floodplain on a 20-foot embankment close to the west of Ambaston, a limited interchange, with northbound traffic on the M42 passing on to eastbound traffic on the A52 west of Risley, Derbyshire, pass right through the Erewash Valley Golf Club, and cross the M1 at the Stoney Clouds nature area, directly north of Sandiacre, next to the east side of the M1, at a free-flow interchange. From there, an M42 spur would cross north-east across Trowell Moor, and finish at the junction of the A609 and the B6004 Coventry Lane (now the A6002), at Balloon Woods near Wollaton. Construction was planned for 1975, to take two or three years.

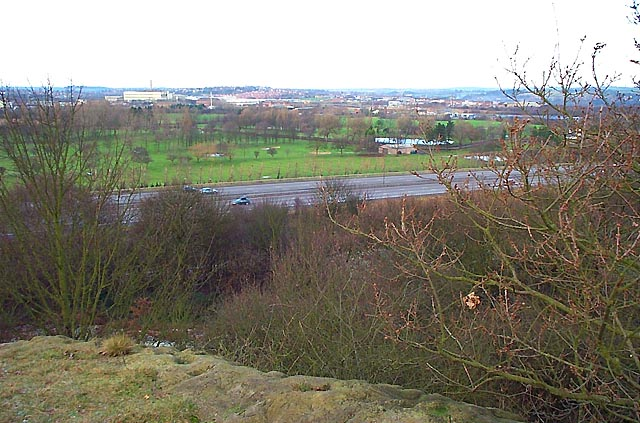
Stoney Clouds in January 2003

Complaints could be sent until 10 November 1972. There were 5,400 complaints. The public enquiry was on 11 September 1973 in Long Eaton.

In 1973 it was proposed to meet M1 at Stanton by Dale, or possibly to have a link from the M42 at Swarkestone to the M1 at Lockington. Stanton by Dale and Risley, Derbyshire formed an action group, and Sandiacre was quite unhappy about the project as well. A protest was led by chairman George Knott.

Nottinghamshire County Council objected to the Stanton plan, so it was dropped in March 1976. A revised plan would be published in October 1976. In October 1976 it was expected that a link road from Appleby would meet the M1 at Lockington. The link road, from October 1976 was expected to now only be two-lane, not three lane. Requirements had been changed in the mid-1970s. Another road being looked at, at the same time in 1976, was the A616 being developed as an extension of the M67 motorway in south-east Manchester. Also the M64 motorway was planned to meet M1 at Lockington; the A564 reached Lockington, later the A50.

== Features ==
=== Birmingham Motorway Box ===
Along with sections of the M5 and M6, the southern sections of the M42 form the Birmingham Motorway Box around Birmingham. Similar to an orbital motorway such as the M25 around London, and the M60 around Manchester, there are areas where this orbital system does not work well. One such point is junction 3A, the link between the M42 and the M40, where traffic is often heavy in the rush hour. The section between the M42 and M6 is often very busy too especially around junction 6 for Birmingham Airport and NEC. The 2024 newly constructed J5a should eliminate some of these queues.

==== Managed motorways and Active Traffic Management ====
Active Traffic Management (ATM) was launched as a pilot scheme on the M42 operating between junction 3a and 7 with mandatory variable speed limits, hard shoulder running, better driver information signs and a new incident management system. This system allows operators to open and close any lane to traffic in order to help manage congestion or an incident. Between 2006 and 2007, journey times have decreased by 26% northbound and 9% southbound and journey time variability has decreased by 27%. Due to the success of the trial this system was later extended northbound to junction 9 of the M42 (and onto the adjacent M6 to junction 5) and southbound along the M40 to junction 15 as part of the first phase of a nationwide roll out of the rebranded 'Managed motorways; concept.

== Incidents and accidents ==
- A collision involving 160 vehicles occurred on 10 March 1997 in fog in Bromsgrove, Worcestershire which resulted in three deaths and 60 injuries.
- Drivers have rated the M42 as the worst motorway in England, in a 2024 survey from Transport Focus, scoring 56 per cent for overall satisfaction from road users, citing speed limits ("for no reason"), delays, roadworks and potholes.

== New junction ==
In December 2024, a new junction, 5a, opened. It is located between Solihull junction 5 and Birmingham Airport/NEC junction 6 and 2.4 km (1.5 miles) of new dual carriageway the A4545 alongside the motorway. It provides access to Birmingham Airport and Birmingham Business Park and aims to reduce congestion in the area.

Work started in 2021 to build the new junction and road and finished on schedule at the end of 2024.

== Services ==
A service area was planned for Hampton in Arden around 1973, of 40 acres (16 ha). The local village did not want it, known as the Friday Lane Service Area. Following a public enquiry, the service area was cancelled in February 1974.

== Junctions ==
Data from driver location signs are used to provide distance and carriageway identifier information. If a junction extends over several hundred metres and both start and end points are known, both are shown.

M42 motorway junctions
mile	km	South-westbound exits (A carriageway)	Junction	North-eastbound exits (B carriageway)	Coordinates
0.0; 0.9	0.0; 1.4	The North West, Birmingham (W, N & C), Stourbridge, (M6) M5(N); The South West, Worcester M5(S)	M5 J4A	Start of motorway	52.3480°N 2.0746°W
1.4; 1.6	2.3; 2.6	Bromsgrove A38	J1	No access (on-slip only)	52.3556°N 2.0458°W
5.6; 6.0	9.0; 9.6	Birmingham (S) A441; Hopwood Park services	J2; Services	Birmingham (S) A441; Hopwood Park services	52.3618°N 1.9489°W
8.4	13.5	Entering Worcestershire	J3	Birmingham (S), Redditch, Evesham A435	52.3549°N 1.8859°W
8.8	14.1	Birmingham (S), Redditch, Evesham A435	J3	Entering Warwickshire	52.3549°N 1.8859°W
11.7; 12.2	18.8; 19.7	End of variable speed limit	J3A (TOTSO NB) (Note: 52.3488°N 1.8097°W Termination point M40)	Start of variable speed limit	52.3486°N 1.8114°W
		London, Warwick, Stratford M40	J3A (TOTSO NB)	London, Warwick, Stratford M40	52.3486°N 1.8114°W
		Entering Warwickshire		Entering West Midlands	52.3629°N 1.8043°W
14.2; 14.5	22.8; 23.3	Shirley A34	J4	Shirley A34	52.3797°N 1.7865°W
16.5; 16.9	26.6; 27.2	Solihull A41	J5	Solihull A41	52.4051°N 1.7500°W
		No access (on-slip only)	J5a	Birmingham Airport A4545	52.424381°N 1.720063°W
19.9; 20.3	32.1; 32.7	Birmingham (E), Birmingham International, Birmingham, National Exhibition Centre, Coventry A45	J6	Birmingham (E), Birmingham International, Birmingham, National Exhibition Centre A45(W) Coventry (S & W), N.E.C. A45(E)	52.4451°N 1.7099°W
22.1; 22.6	35.6; 36.4	No access (on-slip only)	J7 (Note: 52.4774°N 1.7109°W Southern M6 / M42 intersection)	The North West, Birmingham (C & N) M6(N)	52.4738°N 1.7115°W
		Entering West Midlands		Entering Warwickshire	52.4744°N 1.7114°W
22.7; 22.9	36.6; 36.8	No access	J7A (TOTSO SB) (Note: 52.4837°N 1.7106°W Northern M6 / M42 intersection)	London (M1), Coventry M6	52.4815°N 1.7103°W
		London (N & E) (M1), Coventry (N & E) M6	J7A (TOTSO SB)	No access (on-slip only)	52.4912°N 1.7151°W
24.5	39.4	Birmingham (Central, E, N & W) M6(N)	J8	No access (on-slip only)	52.5091°N 1.7255°W
		No access (on slip only)	J9	The North West, Cannock, Lichfield M6 Toll	52.5293°N 1.7296°W
26.7	42.9	Start of variable speed limit	J9	Kingsbury A4097, Lichfield A446	52.5388°N 1.7263°W
26.7	42.9	The North West M6 Toll, Coleshill A446, A4097	J9	End of variable speed limit	52.5388°N 1.7263°W
32.4	52.2	Nuneaton, Tamworth A5, Lichfield (A38); Tamworth services	J10; Services	Nuneaton, Tamworth A5; Tamworth services	52.6033°N 1.6416°W
		Entering Warwickshire		Entering Leicestershire	52.6720°N 1.5612°W
39.7	63.9	Start of motorway	J11; Services (Note: 52.6935°N 1.5470°W J11, A42)	Burton upon Trent, Measham A444	52.6890°N 1.5485°W
40.0	64.4	Nuneaton A444; Non-motorway traffic	J11; Services	End of motorway Road continues as A42 towards East Midlands Airport	52.6929°N 1.5471°W
Notes: Distances in kilometres and carriageway identifiers are obtained from driver location signs/location marker posts. Where a junction spans several hundred metres and the data is available, both the start and finish values for the junction are shown.
1.000 mi = 1.609 km; 1.000 km = 0.621 mi: Incomplete access

=== A42 junctions ===
A42 road junctions
Northbound exits	Junction	Southbound exits
Road merges onto M1 continuing towards Nottingham	M1 J23A; Services	Start of road
East Midlands, Nottingham (S), Derby (A6) A453; Donington Park services	M1 J23A; Services	No access (on-slip only)
Castle Donington A453	J14	No access (on-slip only)
Ashby, Coalville, Leicester A511, Loughborough A512	J13	Ashby, Burton, Coalville A511
Snarestone B4116, Ashby	J12	Snarestone, Measham B4116
Start of road	M42 J11; Services	Nuneaton A444; Non-motorway traffic
Burton upon Trent, Measham A444	M42 J11; Services	Road continues as M42 towards Tamworth

== Service stations ==
- Donington Park services

== See also ==
- List of motorways in the United Kingdom
- Category:M42 motorway service stations
- Anomalously numbered roads in Great Britain
