= Smart motorway =

Designation of roads in the United Kingdom

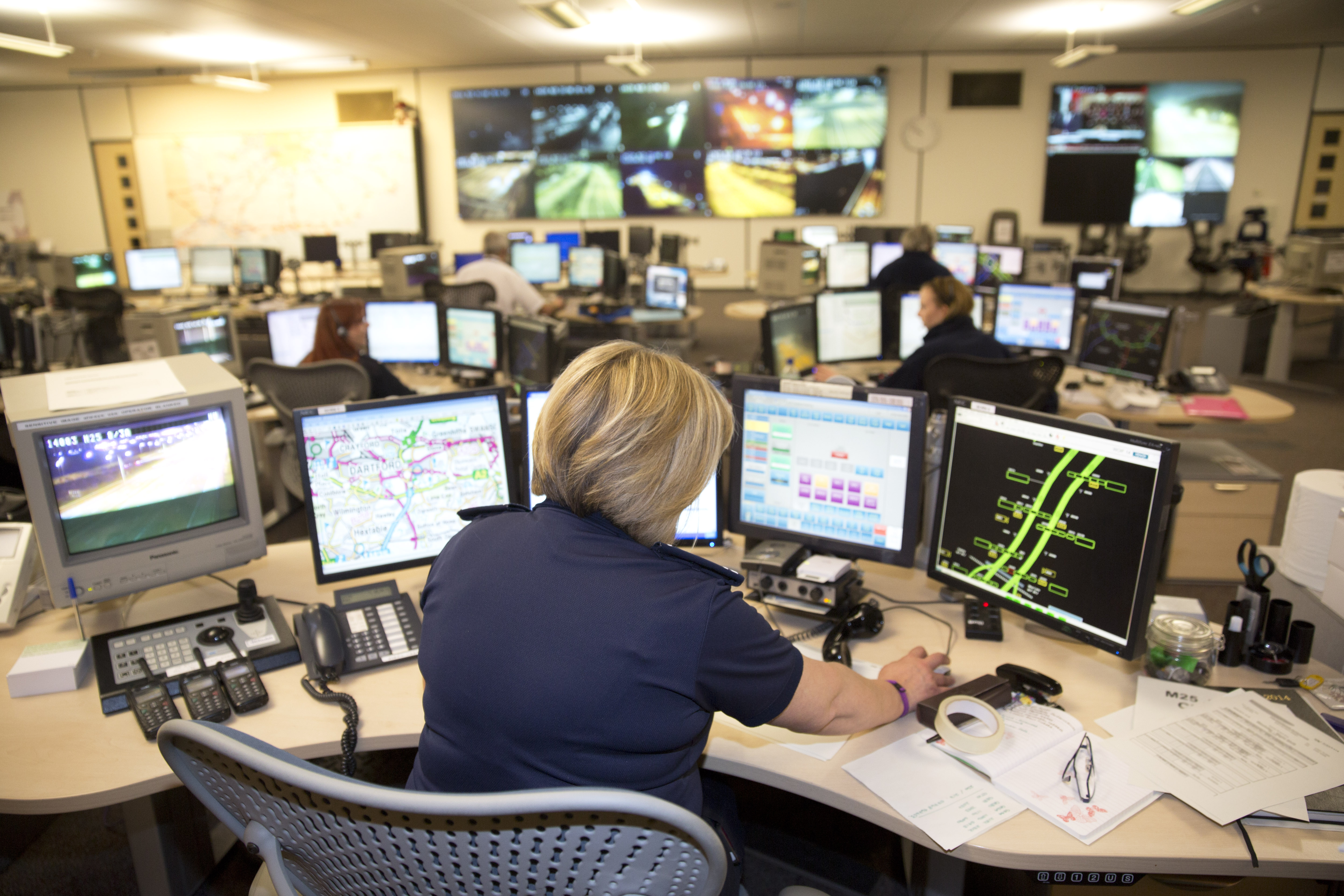
A control room for the M25 J5-7 Smart Motorways scheme, 2014

A smart motorway (formerly managed motorway), also known in Scotland as an intelligent transport system, is a section of motorway in the United Kingdom that employs active traffic management (ATM) to increase capacity. Technologies used include Motorway Incident Detection and Automatic Signalling (MIDAS), variable speed limits and variable lane control. At particularly busy times, ramp metering may be used, and some roads permit the hard shoulder to be used as a running lane.

Smart motorways were developed at the turn of the 21st century as a cost-effective alternative to traditional carriageway widening, with intended benefits ranging from shorter journey times to lower vehicle emissions. However, smart motorways have received intense criticism from politicians, police representatives and motoring organisations, mainly for perceived reductions in safety, particularly regarding the removal of the hard shoulder from some sections of motorway. Such roads are known as all-lane running (ALR) motorways, and replace the traditional hard shoulder with a full-time running lane with discrete emergency refuge areas. A 2020 government report found that ALR conversions reduced the frequency of fatal casualties, but increased the frequency of non-fatal casualties. The incidence of collisions between moving vehicles decreased, but collisions between moving and stationary vehicles increased.

In April 2023, the government scrapped plans for the building of all new smart motorways, citing costs and a "lack of confidence felt by drivers" as reasons for the decision.

The term controlled motorway is sometimes used for schemes that use variable speed limits without hard-shoulder running (for example, the M25 motorway between junction 27 and junction 30).

== History ==
The traffic management technique, including hard shoulder running, was first used in its full specification in the UK on the M42 motorway in the West Midlands in 2006. A higher speed limit of 60 miles per hour (97 km/h) was trialled on the southbound carriageway between junctions 4 and 3A from 2008 (a 10 miles per hour (16 km/h) increase on the previous maximum permissible speed).

In 2007 plans were announced by the then secretary of state for transport, Ruth Kelly, to extend the scheme to two sections of the M6 motorway near Birmingham (4-5 and 8a-10) by 2011 at a cost of £150 million. The emergency refuges were to be extended to every 800 metres (0.50 mi) on the roll out. A study into the use of ATM on the M1, M4, M20 and M25 motorways was also announced, however the Department for Transport had decided to proceed with a scheme to widen sections of the M25.

A £2 billion contract was announced to extend the scheme to sections of the M1, M4, M5, M6, M60 and M62 in February 2010 with a further announcement by the new government in October 2010. The contract was awarded to four delivery partners Balfour Beatty, Carillion and joint ventures BAM Nuttall/Morgan Sindall and Costain Group/Serco. In January 2012, Carillion won the contract for M6 junctions 5 - 8 near Birmingham for £126 million.

From 2013 the current term smart motorway was used by the Highways Agency (now National Highways) to promote the technology to road users.

In January 2018, the contracts previously awarded to Carillion were taken on by Kier, following the former's entry into compulsory liquidation.

In April 2021, the government announced that new smart motorways would include radar, to detect vehicles which had stopped, and additional cameras to aid the detection (and subsequent prosecution) of motorists using lanes which are marked as being closed. The government stated that existing smart motorways would have these additional safety features installed by September 2022.

On 16 April 2023, the government announced that the smart motorways scheme would be halted permanently, citing "financial pressures and lack of confidence felt by drivers".

In June 2023, construction started to install over 150 additional emergency refuge areas on existing smart motorways as part of a national programme. This was completed in April 2025.

== Features ==
=== Emergency refuge areas ===
The new emergency area sign being trialled on smart motorways

In 2017, Highways England trialled a new type of emergency area on the M3 that would be more visibly obvious to motorists. A new sign accompanied the trial which is similar in design to European emergency area signs. These changes have subsequently been trialled on the M5 and M25 with the signs being authorised by the Department for Transport for further use.

Emergency stopping areas, when used correctly, are safer than hard shoulders. However, the government has subsequently reduced the specification of smart motorway design, increasing the minimum interval between refuge areas, possibly decreasing the likelihood of a driver being able to reach a place of relative safety in the event of a breakdown.

=== Stopped vehicle detection ===
Some (18% in 2019) smart motorways employ stopped vehicle detection (SVD). The government states that all lane running motorways are designed to operate safely without the need for SVD, however SVD reduces the time it takes for National Highways control room staff to close the traffic lane to just one minute. <

=== Text messages ===
Early systems used dot matrix signs on gantries to display short text messages, with smaller variable signs above each lane and to the sides of the carriageway. Current smart motorway systems often use the "MS4" sign type which can include pictograms from the Traffic Signs Regulations and General Directions.

=== Variable lane control ===
To close a lane to traffic, the motorway gantries display a red cross (❌) to signify a lane closure. The red cross is a legal requirement for motorists under section 36(1) of the Road Traffic Act 1988 (failure to comply with a traffic sign), and failure to comply can result in a fixed penalty of £100 fine and three points. but can be penalised with a fine of up to £1,000 and a 56 day driving ban if prosecuted in court.

Compliance is at 92%, which has not decreased since 2019. Road users want to see a 'zero tolerance' approach towards vehicles disobeying a red cross.

== Effectiveness ==
=== Reduced relative cost ===
In 2007 it was estimated that ATM could be introduced within two years at a cost of around £5-15 million per mile as opposed to 10 years and £79 million per mile for widening.

In Autumn 2018, alteration of the M4 between junctions 3 and 12 was commenced, a length of 32 miles (51 km). Construction was completed in March 2022, but as of July 2022 calibration work of some sections is still underway. The cost was £848 million, representing £26.5 million per mile (£16.6 million per km). Emergency stopping areas in this section of the M4 have been provided every 1.3 miles (2.1 km).

=== Initial experiments ===
The M42 scheme was initially run as an experiment and a Highways Agency report into the first six months of the scheme showed a reduction in variability of journey times of up to 27%. The journey time statistics can be broken down to show that northbound journey times were reduced by 26%, equating to an average reduction of 4 minutes as compared to the period when the variable speed limits were on, but the hard shoulder was not being used, and 9% southbound (equating to 1 minute) during the afternoon rush hour. The report also indicated a fall in the number of accidents from over 5 a month to 1.5 per month on average. The Agency did state that normally accident statistics should be compared over a 3-year period, so the initial results should be treated with caution. They also stated that no accidents had been caused by hard shoulder use as a normal lane. The report also stated that there had been a 10% fall in pollution and 4% fall in fuel consumption. The report also indicated a compliance rate of 98% to the indicated speed limits when using the hard shoulder. For comparison, before the introduction of mandatory speed limits at road works, the compliance rate was 10% as opposed to 89% afterwards, showing a similar effect.

=== Road capacity ===
All lane running motorway upgrades improve journey capacity. The Government argues that this improves safety as it encourages drivers away from statistically more dangerous rural or A roads. A smart motorway can carry 1,600 additional vehicles per hour in each direction, and up to 11,000 journeys a day.

In the short term, smart motorway upgrades can reduce journey times. For example, on the M6 around Crewe, the average commuting time decreased by an average of 40 minutes.

=== Public opinion ===
A 2022 survey found that 73% of drivers will not use the leftmost lane on a smart motorway. This is an increase since 2019 (56%).

According to the RAC, only 23% of drivers trust that the highways authority can identify a stopped vehicle and respond accordingly'.

In 2022, 22% of drivers say they do not feel confident on motorways without a hard shoulder. This is compared to 12% on motorways with a hard shoulder and 8% on dual carriageways (normally without a hard shoulder).

Emergency refuge areas are currently provided up to 1.5 miles (2.5 km) apart. 63% of drivers believed this is too far and 79% of drivers are concerned they would not be able to reach a refuge in time.

=== Emergency vehicle access ===
Due to the removal of the hard shoulder, there is some concern over the ability of emergency services and traffic patrol officers to access incidents on smart motorways when traffic is congested.

== Safety ==
Motorways are the safest roads in Great Britain, with more Killed or Seriously Injured (KSI) collisions recorded on A roads. Theoretically, smart motorways are designed to reduce certain types of risks through several features. For instance, traffic speeds tend to be more uniform, and technology is in place to monitor and notify drivers of potential hazards. Moreover, the emergency areas are intended to provide a safer place to stop compared to traditional hard shoulders.

Overall, Government statistics show that ALR smart motorways register well on safety performance. Statistics demonstrate a decrease in personal injury collision and casualty rates compared with the national trend. On individual conversions, a decrease in recorded after introduction of ALR. There was effectively no change in the Killed & Seriously Injured collision and casualty rates. However, Highways Magazine revealed that in the long-term, smart motorways may become more dangerous because the extra space they create is taken up by increased traffic.

All lane running (ALR) schemes - whereby the hard shoulder is removed - appear to be more unsafe because they design out the current principal safety mechanism on motorways - the hard shoulder. An independent review concluded that it is beyond doubt that the removal of a hard shoulder is less safe than any other form of 'smart' motorway.

=== All casualties ===
According to a 2012 analysis by Highways England, ALR motorways were expected to lower risks by 20% when compared to conventional, three-lane motorways.Highways England and the Department for Transport monitored both slight and serious casualties between 2015 and 2018. The statistics revealed a small uptick in serious and slight casualties, but a slight decline in fatal casualties. However, accuracy is limited because road comparisons may not be entirely comparable. Per 100 million miles travelled, the following were measured –

Annual average casualties per 100,000,000 vehicle miles travelled, by SRN road type (2015-2018 average)
	Fatal casualties	Serious casualties	Slight casualties
Conventional roads
Strategic A roads	0.46	3	20
Conventional motorway	0.16	1.1	10
Smart motorway
Controlled	0.06	1.2	18
Dynamic hard shoulder	0.06	1.2	19
All lane running	0.11	1.3	12

When examining individual sections of motorway before and after their conversion to ALR, statistics reveal that the risk of relative personal injury collisions (among the top 21 hazards or 90 per cent of the total risk) decreased to approximately 81 per cent of the previous total. Although there was an increase in vehicles stopping in the running lane, hazards that lead to personal injuries, such as speeding, tailgating and drifting off the carriageway, were significantly reduced. However, a study showed that the installation of a smart motorway on the M6 did not reduce the impact of accidents and, in fact, caused a 50% increase in accidents over five years.

=== Stopped vehicle collisions ===
Most collisions which occur on the road network occur between moving, rather than stopped, traffic. For example, on all-lane running motorways between 2016 and 2020, 76 collisions happened involving at least one stopped vehicle and 1,370 happened involving no stopped vehicles.

Emergency stopping areas, when used correctly, are safer than hard shoulders. On hard shoulders, there remains a risk from personal safety. 1 of every 14 fatal casualties on English motorways occur to vehicles on, leaving or entering the hard shoulder. For instance in 2017, there were 100 casualties on the hard shoulder. According to Highways England, there is a reduction in personal injury collisions in 'places of relative safety' (i.e. not in an operational traffic lane) when ALR is in use. However, the Government has reduced the specification of smart motorway design, increasing the minimum interval between refuge areas, possibly decreasing the likelihood of a driver being able to reach a place of relative safety.

When ALR is in use, the risk of breaking down in a live lane as a proportion of total breakdowns doubles, compared with motorways with a permanent hard shoulder, and increases, compared with motorways with a dynamic hard shoulder. Between 2016 and 2020, 243,701 live lane breakdowns occurred on the strategic road network. More than half of these took place on motorways with a hard shoulder, though live lane breakdowns are less likely to be recorded on non-smart than smart motorways. It is still lower proportional risk than breaking down on an A-road. The chance of a collision when broken down in a live lane is small. On ALR schemes, an average of two live lane breakdown collisions occur on each section each year (making up 17% of all KSI collisions). Therefore, it can be said that while the risk of breaking down in a live lane increases, the risk of collision when broken down in a safer place decreases.

=== Fatalities ===
Fatalities on motorways in England (2016-2020)
Type	Fatalities (casualty per hmvm)
Conventional motorway	0.15
All-lane running	0.12
Dynamic hard shoulder	0.09
Controlled motorway	0.07
A-roads	0.41

From 2015 and 2020, at least 38 fatalities were attributed to smart motorways. This is a proportion of total fatalities on the motorway network, which varies year on year. For example, there were 77 motorway deaths in 2015. In 2020, 0.64% of total fatalities on England's road network took place on ALR and dynamic hard shoulder motorways, which collectively carried 3.29% of traffic in England. Per mile travelled, fatal casualty rates are a third higher on conventional motorways.

However, according to Highways Magazine, DfT data shows that the fatality rate on ALR motorways is higher than conventional motorways. In 2018, the ALR 'live lane' fatality rate was 0.19 per 100,000,000 vehicle miles, compared to 0.14 on conventional motorways. However in 2019, it was 0.14 and 0.13 respectively. In 2015, 2016 and 2017, death rates were lower on ALR roads.

In September 2018, a woman was killed after her car broke down in an area with no hard shoulder and was hit by another vehicle. Warning signs were not activated until 22 minutes after the breakdown, and the coroner criticised the smart motorway system for not making it clear to drivers that "the onus is on them" to report breakdowns.

== Criticisms ==
The Campaign for Better Transport argued that whilst it would reduce the need for widening schemes, it did nothing to reduce traffic and CO_{2} emissions. Friends of the Earth criticised the scheme as "widening on the cheap" and also pointed to a possible increase in vehicle emissions. Highways England argue that ATM reduces the environmental impact in regards to widening as it is carried out within the existing boundaries of the motorway as well as a possible improvement in local air quality due to smoother traffic flow.

The RAC cited a study in the Netherlands that showed drivers using the hard shoulder when they were not permitted, increasing the risk of a collision for vehicles stopped. The Royal Society for the Prevention of Accidents also expressed concern that emergency services would take longer to reach an incident. The Highways Agency rejected this concern based on the 5,000 miles (8,000 km) of dual carriageway that does not have a hard shoulder. Disability groups were concerned that some drivers would not be able to access the emergency phones or even exit their vehicles, leaving them at increased risk. Ruth Kelly, former Secretary of State for Transport stated that these schemes were useful, but that motorway widening would still be considered where it was appropriate.

The scheme has attracted criticism from motoring organisations such as the AA, who in 2018 reported that many members were concerned that speed limits were being imposed without good cause in situations where traffic was light. In response, Highways England stated that they had "started a comprehensive review of how variable speed limits are set, including the amount of time they are visible to drivers".

A campaign "Smart Motorways Kill" was set up in 2019 after the death of Jason Mercer and Alexandru Murgeanu on the M1 northbound near junction 34. They were killed when a heavy goods vehicle collided with their stationary vehicles, after they had pulled over following a minor accident. The lane they were in was not closed until after they were killed. The campaign is bringing a judicial review against Highways England to have smart motorways banned and they have also reported H.E to the police for criminal manslaughter. They are also looking at bringing a disability discrimination complaint and class action.

In January 2020, it was announced that a review was planned after freedom of information requests showed that near misses had increased up to 20-fold, and that 38 people had died. The emergency refuge areas (ERA) were placed 500 metres (0.31 mi) apart on the M42 pilot scheme, but can be 2.5 kilometres (1.6 mi) apart on stretches of the M25.

A BBC Panorama programme aired on 27 January 2020 found that smart motorways had caused multiple deaths in the UK, and that the conversion of part of the M25 to "all-lane running" yielded a 2000% increase in hazardous "near misses".

On 28 January 2020, Police Federation of England and Wales chief, reported The Times newspaper, John Apter said he "did not like the term 'smart motorways'" because it infers that they are a good idea. "They’re anything but" and "a recipe for disaster. It’s a death trap. It’s inherently dangerous and putting lives at risk."

In January 2020, all "Smart Motorways" were put under review to address safety concerns and determine an action plan. No new such motorways would open until this review was published. On 12 March 2020, the review and action plan was published. It stated changes to the standards for new smart motorways (ones which had not started construction) such as a reduction from up to 1.5 miles to 1 mile between emergency refuge areas (or other qualifying areas) and stranded vehicle detection radars to be installed as part of the project. Other actions it required to be taken is for all Dynamic Hard Shoulder Motorways to be converted into All-Lane-Running by March 2025, Stranded Vehicle Detection radars to be installed on all Smart Motorways within 36 months & a potential national programme to install more ERAs on current smart motorways.

In 2021 Labour Police and Crime Commissioner from South Yorkshire Alan Billings criticised smart motorways. The same year, the government announced the retrofitting of the entire network with radar and improved cameras, and paused the construction of any more smart motorways until this was implemented.

On 16 April 2023, the Government announced that no new smart motorways would be built. The Transport Secretary at the time, Mark Harper, cited "the lack of public confidence felt by drivers and the cost pressures due to inflation". Existing smart motorways would have additional emergency areas fitted. However, the M56 J6-8 and M6 J21a-26 schemes will be completed, given they are already over three-quarters of the way complete.

In April 2024, the safety of smart motorways was again brought into question when it was revealed that the technology used to detect broken down vehicles was often failing. A Freedom of Information request revealed that at some locations, cameras and radar detection was out of action for up to five days at a time.

In 2025 Transport Action Network warned that the government was still building smart motorways, giving the Lower Thames Crossing and the M60 Simister Island upgrade schemes as examples.

== Current smart motorways ==
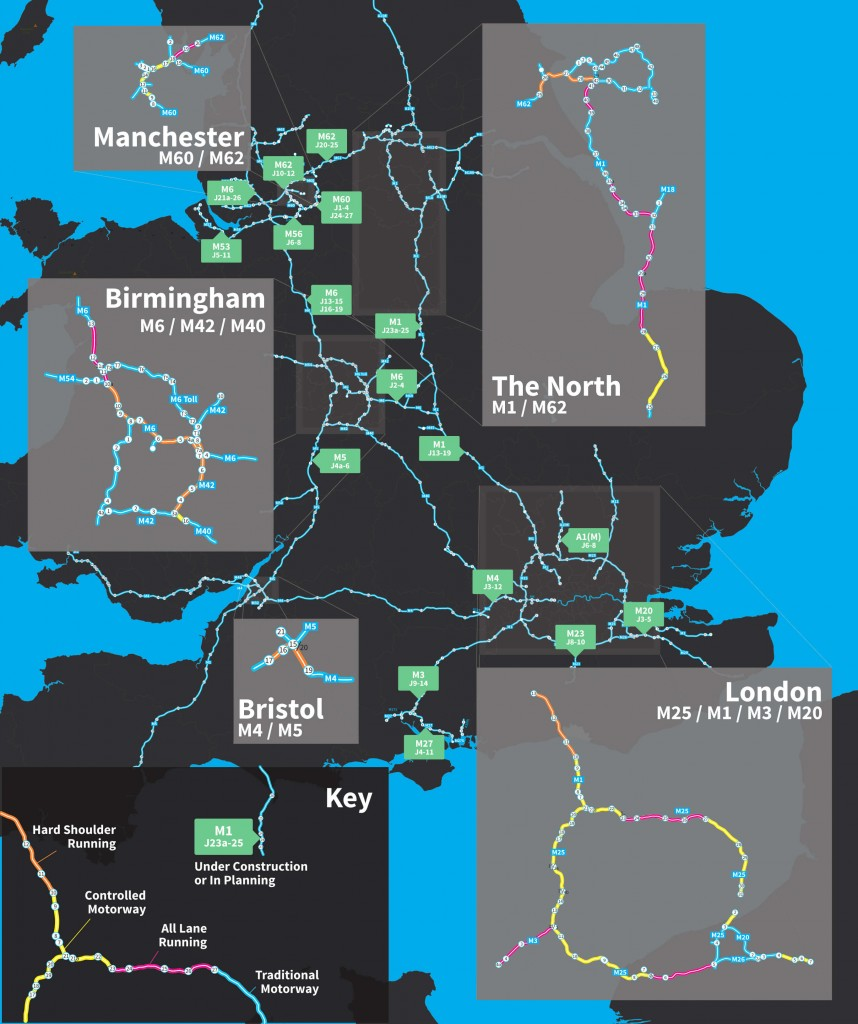
A map of the UK's smart motorway system built from publicly available data of constructed and planned smart motorway systems

The map in this section visually represents the operational and under construction elements of the UK's smart motorway system as of June 2017.

National Highways (England), the South Wales Trunk Road Agent (there are no motorways in North Wales), DfI Roads (Northern Ireland) and Transport Scotland are responsible for the construction and maintenance of smart motorways in their respective countries.

=== Controlled motorway ===
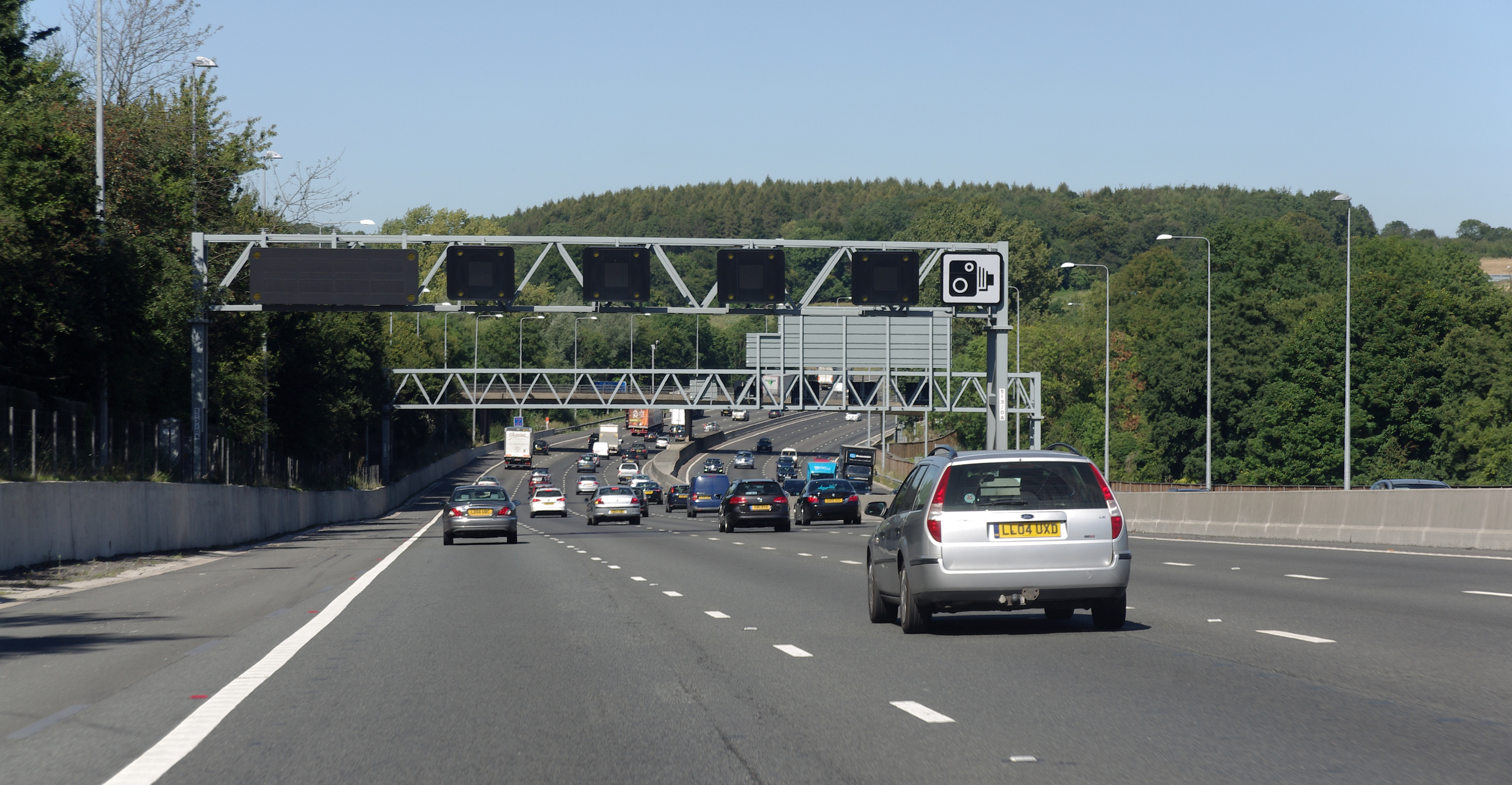
A section of controlled motorway on the M25 in Hertfordshire

Variable speed limits with the hard shoulder operating as it would on a conventional motorway. They have most often been installed where a motorway has previously been widened but with a discontinuous hard shoulder to incorporate existing bridges, therefore using the hard shoulder as a running lane is ruled out. Existing gantries are upgraded to support signals capable of displaying a mandatory speed limit and speed cameras.

==== Locations ====
- M1: J6A-J10, J23A-J24, J25-J28 and J31-J32
- M6: J10A-J11A
- M8: J7-8, J8-10 (Eastbound)
- M9: J1-J1A (southbound)
- M20: J5-J7 (Note: J4-J5 upgraded from controlled motorway to all-lane running in 2020.)
- M25: J2-J3, J6-J7 (anti-clockwise), J7-J23 and J27-J30
- M40: J16-M42 J3A (northbound)
- M42: J3-J3A (eastbound), J7-J9
- M60: J8-J18
- M62: J9-J10 (eastbound) and J28-J29
- M73: J1-J2, J2-J2A (Southbound)
- M74: J2A-J5
- M90: M9 J1A-J2 and J2-J3 (southbound)
- A90: Special road between the M90 in South Queensferry
- A14: J22-J33
- A1: Brampton Hut Interchange: Where the A1 meets the new A14
- A470: Between the A468 and M4 J32 (Southbound)

Notes

1. 1: J4-J5 upgraded from controlled motorway to all-lane running in 2020.
2. 2: A bus lane is in operation on the southbound hard-shoulder between J1a and J2a and on the approach to the southbound M9. The hard shoulders on the Queensferry Crossing are opened to buses when the Forth Road Bridge is closed.

=== Dynamic hard shoulder running ===
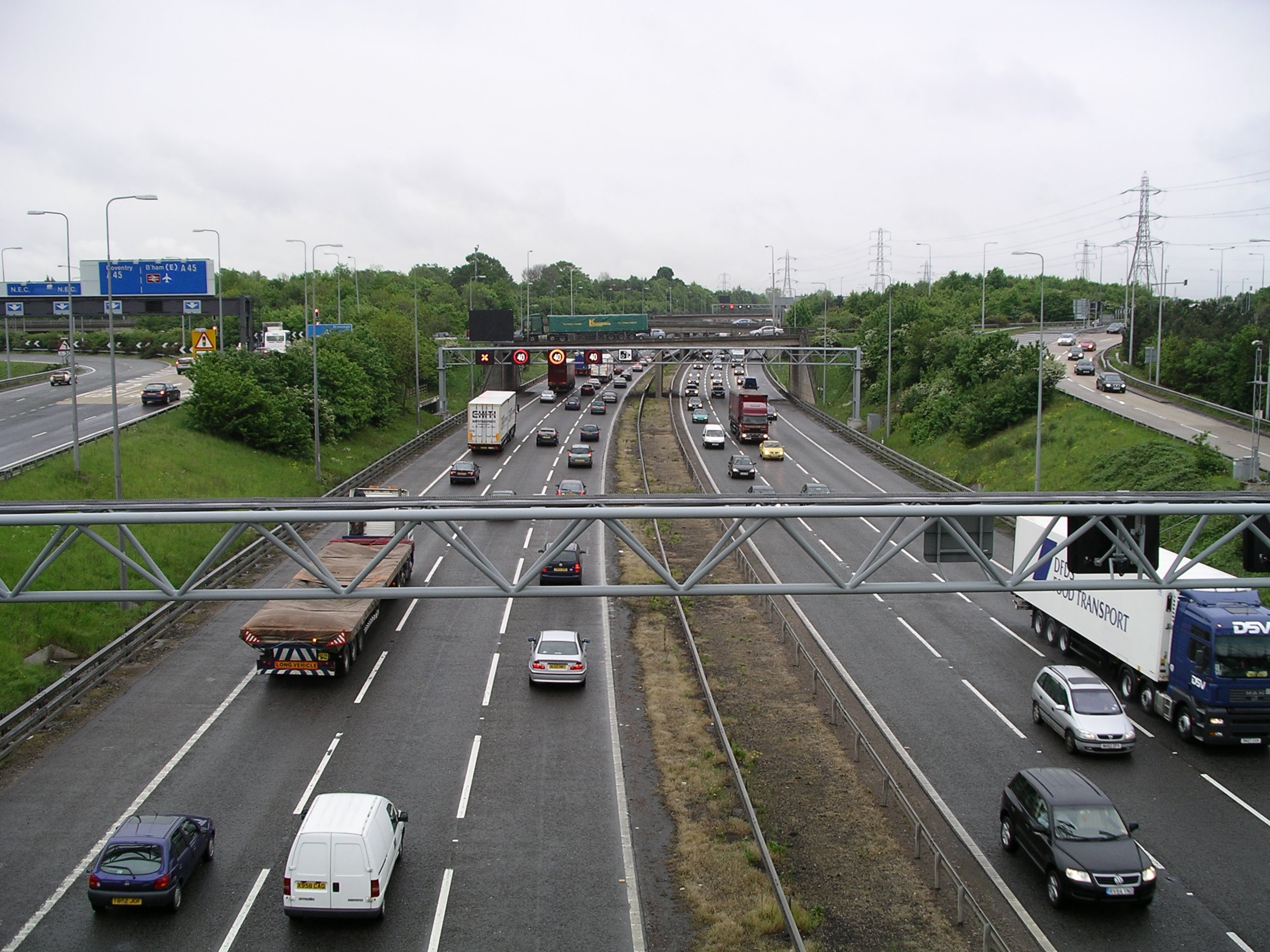
M42 with hard shoulder running in the West Midlands. It is shown as closed while the ordinary lanes have a mandatory 40mph speed limit.

Variable speed limits with the hard shoulder selectively opened as a running lane during periods when traffic levels are too high for only three lanes of running traffic. When activated, vehicles can use the hard shoulder as a running lane. All lanes are limited to a maximum of 60 mph, but these can be lowered further.

In October 2019, the chief executive of Highways England told MPs that the company has no plans to introduce the configuration to any further section of motorway, after admitting that motorists found the setup 'too confusing' to use. A study conducted in the previous month found that more than half of motorists surveyed would not drive on a hard shoulder even if it was open.

A stocktake taken in March 2021 confirmed that all DHSR smart motorways would end the use of them by March 2025 by converting all current DHSR to ALR, but these conversions will now not be carried out, following the withdrawal of all Smart Motorway schemes in April 2023.

==== Locations ====
- M1: J10-J13
- M4: J19-J20
- M5: J15-J17
- M6: J4-J10A
- M42: J3A-J7
- M62: J26-J28 and J29-J30 (eastbound)

=== All lane running ===
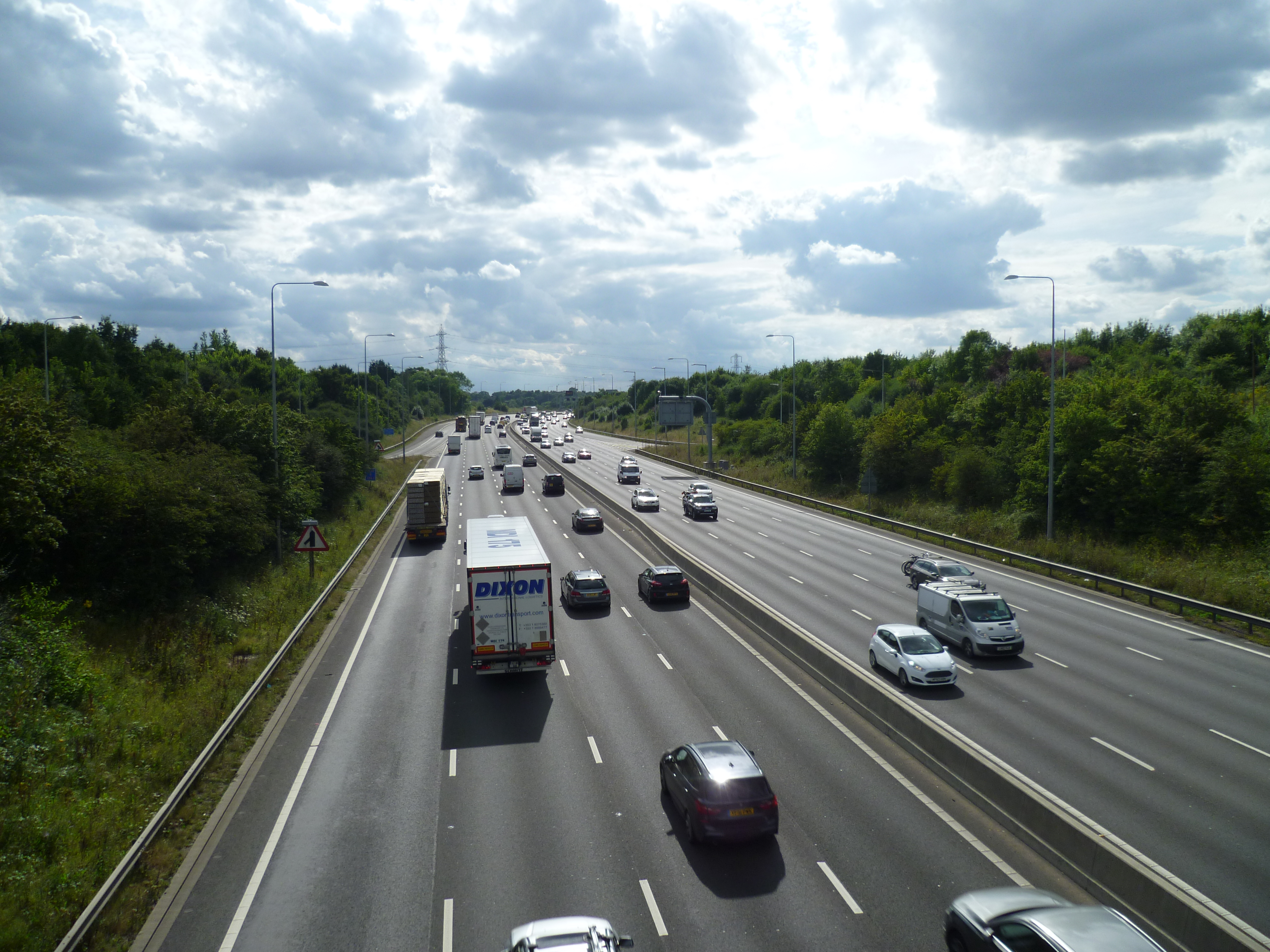
A stretch of the M25 in Hertfordshire, where the motorway operates as four-lane running without a hard shoulder between J23-27

Variable speed limits with the hard shoulder removed and converted to a permanent running lane.

==== Locations ====
- M1: J13-J19, J24-25, J28-J31, J32-J35A and J39-J42
- M3: J2-J4A
- M4: J3-J12
- M5: J4A-J6
- M6: J2-J4, J11A-J15 and J16-J19, J21A-26
- M20: J3-J5
- M23: J8-J10
- M25: J5-J6, J6-J7 (clockwise) and J23-J27
- M27: J4-J11
- M56: J6-J8
- M62: J10-J12, J18-J20, J25-J26 and J29-J30 (westbound)

Notes

1. 1: Includes upgrade of J4-J5 from controlled motorway to all-lane running.

=== Through-junction running ===
Isolated stretches on a smart motorway where the hard shoulder becomes a permanent running lane through a junction and immediately surrounding the slip roads.

==== Locations ====
- M1: J10, J11, J11A and J12 (Note: Including Toddington services 1 mile to the south.)
- M6: J10

=== Smart motorways by geographic area ===
==== England ====
- Bedfordshire
  - M1
- Berkshire
  - M4, M25
- Buckinghamshire
  - M1, M4, M25
- Cheshire
  - M6, M56, M62
- Derbyshire
  - M1
- Essex
  - M25
- Gloucestershire
  - M4, M5
- Greater London
  - M4, M25
- Greater Manchester
  - M6, M56, M60, M62
- Hampshire
  - M3, M27
- Hertfordshire
  - M1, M25
- Kent
  - M20, M25
- Leicestershire
  - M1
- Merseyside
  - M6
- Northamptonshire
  - M1
- Nottinghamshire
  - M1
- South Yorkshire
  - M1
- Staffordshire
  - M6
- Surrey
  - M3, M23, M25
- Warwickshire
  - M6, M42
- West Midlands
  - M6, M42
- West Sussex
  - M23
- West Yorkshire
  - M1, M62
- Worcestershire
  - M5

==== Northern Ireland ====
- Belfast
  - M1, A12

==== Scotland ====
- Edinburgh
  - M9, M90
- Fife
  - M90, A823(M)

== Withdrawn schemes ==
Due to the decision to permanently halt the smart motorways scheme, announced on 16 April 2023, all planned schemes have now been withdrawn.

- M3: J9-J14 (All lane running, Cost: £139 million, Estimated completion: 2023/24, Length: 11 miles)
- M25: J10-J16 (Through-junction running at junctions 10, 11 and 12, All lane running between junctions 15 and 16, Start date: 2021, Cost: £200-£400 million, Length: 19 miles)
- M60: J17-J18 (All lane running, Start date: 2024, Cost: £66-£338 million, Length: 2 miles) (Note: Planned as part of improvements to junction 18 of the motorway.)
- M62: J20-J25 (All lane running, Start date: January–March 2023, Cost: £283.2-£392.3 million, Length: 19 miles)
- A1(M): J6-J8 (All lane running, Start date: Road period 3 (2025-2030), Cost: TBC, Length: 7 miles)
- M1: J19-J23A and J35A-J39
- M5: M6 J8-J4A
- M40: J16-M42 J3A (All lane running (including conversion of existing controlled motorway), Cost: £133-£312 million, Estimated completion: 2023/24, Length: 2 miles) (Note: M40/M42 joint scheme.)
- M42: J3-J4 (All lane running (including conversion of existing configurations), Cost: £133-£312 million, Estimated completion: 2023/24, Length: 5 miles)
- M42: M5 J4A-J3
- M53: J5-J11
- M60: J1-J4 and J24-J27 (Note: Continuous section.)

The above sections of motorway were included in the first five-year road investment strategy published in December 2014, however they have been removed from the second and current strategy. Sections of the M1 in Leicestershire and Yorkshire were also billed to receive undescribed 'capacity improvements' in the third road period beginning in 2025, though these have also been withdrawn as part of the April 2023 announcement that construction of new smart motorways was being halted.

The M4 between junctions 24 and 28 near Newport in south Wales had its variable speed limit replaced with a permanent average speed camera-enforced 50 mph limit in early 2021. The Welsh Government believed that changing to a fixed limit would better reduce congestion and improve the quality of the air in the town.

== Timeline of introduction ==
=== 1995 ===
- M25: J10-J15 (SI 1995/1094, Cost: £13.5 million (equivalent to £28 million in 2025), Length: 14 miles)

=== 2001 ===
- M25: J15-J16 (SI 2001/3763, (Note: Revoked and replaced by SI 2012/2134.) Cost: £11.7 million (equivalent to £22 million in 2025), Length: 5 miles)

=== 2005 ===
- M42: J3A-J7 (SI 2005/1671 (Note: Amended by SI 2009/1568.))

=== 2009 ===
- M6: J4-J5 (SI 2009/1571)
- M40: J16-M42 J3A (northbound) (SI 2009/1569)
- M42: J3A eastbound approach (SI 2009/1568)
- M42: J7-J9 (SI 2009/1570)

=== 2010 ===
- M6: J8-J10A (SI 2010/284)
- M20: J4-J7 (SI 2010/775)
- M1 (Northern Ireland): J1-J3 (NISR 2010/173)
- A12 (Northern Ireland): Divis Street (A501)-M1 (Note: North to south in Belfast.) (NISR 2010/173)

=== 2011 ===
- M1: J6A-J10 (SI 2011/1015, Cost: £9 million (equivalent to £13 million in 2025), Length: 10 miles)
- M1: J25-J28 (SI 2011/909, Cost: £9.5 million (equivalent to £14 million in 2025), Length: 16 miles) (Note: Amended by SI 2013/482.)
- M4: J24-J28 (WSI 2011/94, (Note: Revoked and replaced by WSI 2015/1018, itself revoked by WSI 2021/101.) Cost: £7 million (equivalent to £10 million in 2025), Contractor: Balfour Beatty, Length: 10 miles)

=== 2012 ===
- M1: J10-J13 (SI 2012/985, (Note: Amended by SI 2013/482 and SI 2016/1033.) Cost: £327 million (equivalent to £470 million in 2025), Length: 15 miles)
- M9: J1-J1A southbound approach (southbound) (SSI 2012/344)
- M25: J2-J3 (SI 2012/104)
- M25: J7-J10 (SI 2012/2134)
- M62: J25-J30 (SI 2012/1865, Cost: £136 million (equivalent to £196 million in 2025), Length: 15 miles )
- M90: (Note: Originally a spur of the M9.) M9 J1A approach (SSI 2012/343)
- M90: J1C (Note: Originally junction 1 before the motorway was extended south upon the opening of the Queensferry Crossing.)-J2, J2-J3 (southbound) and remainder of M9 J1A spur (SSI 2012/147 (Note: Amended by SSI 2017/128.))
- A823(M): Eastbound approach and slip roads (all directions) at M90 J2 (SSI 2012/145)

=== 2013 ===
- M4: J19-J20 (SI 2013/1123, Cost: £86 million (equivalent to £121 million in 2025), Length: 3 miles) (Note: M4/M5 joint scheme.)
- M5: J15-J17 (SI 2013/1123, Cost: £86 million (equivalent to £121 million in 2025), Length: 3 miles)
- M6: J5-J8 (SI 2013/1201)
- M25: J5-J7 (SI 2013/2397)
- M25: J16-J23 (SI 2013/3167)
- M25: J23-J27 (SI 2013/2396)
- M25: J27-J30 (SI 2013/3166)

=== 2015 ===
- M1: J28-35A (SI 2015/1701)
- M1: J39-J42 (SI 2015/408)
- M3: J2-J4A (SI 2015/241)
- M6: J10A-J13 (SI 2015/8)

=== 2016 ===
- M1: J16-J19 (SI 2016/437, Cost: £65.4 million (equivalent to £90 million in 2025), Length: 14 miles)
- M62: J9-J11 (eastbound) (SI 2016/988, Cost: £7 million (equivalent to £10 million in 2025), Length: 3 miles)

=== 2017 ===
- M5: J4A-J6 (SI 2017/77, Cost: £45.4 million (equivalent to £61 million in 2025), Contractor: Balfour Beatty, Vinci (joint venture), Length: 11 miles)
- M60: J8-J18 (SI 2017/793, Cost: £298.9 million (equivalent to £399 million in 2025), Contractor: Balfour Beatty, BAM Nuttall, Carillion, Costain, Morgan Sindall (joint venture), Length: 12 miles) (Note: M60/M62 joint scheme.)
- M62: J18-J20 (SI 2017/793, Cost: £298.9 million (equivalent to £399 million in 2025), Contractor: Balfour Beatty, BAM Nuttall, Carillion, Costain, Morgan Sindall (joint venture), Length: 5 miles)
- M90/ A90: J1-J1C (SSI 2017/129, Length: 5 miles) (Note: Including Queensferry Crossing.)

=== 2018 ===
- M1: J23A-J25 (SI 2018/819, (Note: Amended by SI 2018/1044.) Cost: £120 million (equivalent to £156 million in 2025), Contractor: Costain, Galliford Try (joint venture), Length: 7 miles)
- M6: J16-J19 (SI 2018/717, Cost: £192-247million, Contractor: Carillion, Kier (joint venture), Length: 18 miles)

=== 2019 ===
- M4: J3-J12 (SI 2019/1430, Cost: £848 million (equivalent to £1086 million in 2025), Contractor: Balfour Beatty, Vinci (joint venture), Length: 34 miles)
- M20: J3-J4 (SI 2019/1158, Cost: £92 million (equivalent to £118 million in 2025), Contractor: Carillion, Kier (joint venture), Length: 3 miles)

=== 2020 ===
- M1: J13-J16 (SI 2020/956, Cost: £373 million (equivalent to £474 million in 2025), Contractor: Costain, Galliford Try (joint venture), Length: 24 miles)
- M6: J2-J4 (SI 2020/47, Cost: £155-£234m, Contractor: Balfour Beatty, Vinci (joint venture), Length: 12 miles)
- M23: J8-J10 (SI 2020/79, Cost: £164 million (equivalent to £208 million in 2025), Contractor: Carillion, Kier (joint venture), Length: 10 miles)
- M62: J10-J11 (westbound) and J11-J12 (SI 2020/85, Cost: £100-£250m, Length: 9 miles)

=== 2021 ===
- M6: J13-J15 (SI 2021/116, Cost: £232.3-£335.4 million, Length: 16 miles)
- M27: J4-J11 (SI 2021/17, Cost: £244 million (equivalent to £302 million in 2025), Length: 14 miles)

=== 2023 ===
- All remaining proposed Smart Motorway schemes are permanently withdrawn, although M56 J6-8 and M6 J21a-26 are allowed to continue to completion.

=== 2025 ===
- M6: J21A-J26 (All lane running, Cost: £100-£250 million Contractor: Costain, Length: 10 miles)
