= Shoulder (road) =

Reserve lane by the verge of a roadway

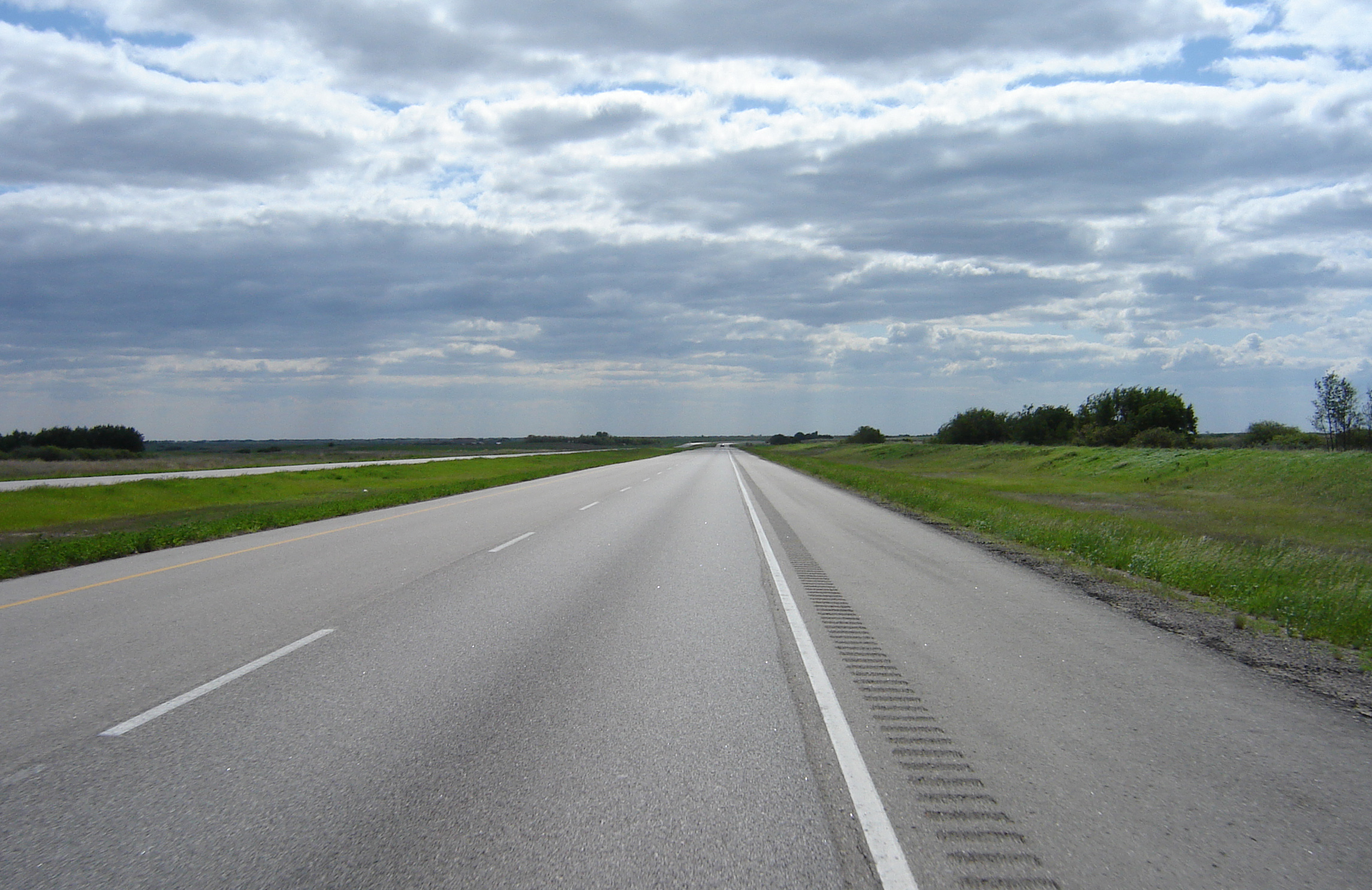
The shoulder of Saskatchewan Highway 11 in this picture (shown to the right of the solid white line) is wide enough to accommodate a stopped car without impeding the flow of traffic in the travel lanes

A shoulder (American English), hard shoulder (British English) or breakdown lane (Australian English) is an emergency stopping lane by the verge on the outer side of a road or motorway. Many wider freeways, or expressways elsewhere have shoulders on both sides of each directional carriageway—in the median, as well as at the outer edges of the road, for additional safety. Shoulders are not intended for use by through traffic, although there are exceptions.

== Purpose ==
Shoulders have multiple uses, including:

- Emergency vehicles such as ambulances, fire trucks and police cars may use the shoulder to bypass traffic congestion in some countries.
- In the event of an emergency or breakdown, a motorist can pull into the shoulder to get out of the flow of traffic and obtain a greater degree of safety.
- Active traffic management, used on busy multi-lane roads, may allow 'hard shoulder running' by general traffic at reduced speeds during periods of high traffic volumes.
- In some places a "bus bypass shoulder" may be provided which allows bus services to pass stationary traffic.
- Paved shoulders provide additional space should a motorist need to take evasive action (such as avoiding a wrong-way driver) or need to recover control of their vehicle before a run-off-road collision occurs.
- In some rural areas without sidewalks, pedestrians and cyclists may be allowed to walk or ride on the shoulders.
- On curbed roadways, shoulders move the gutter away from the travel lanes which reduces the risk of aquaplaning, and reduces splash and spray of stormwater onto pedestrians using any adjacent sidewalk.
- Paved shoulders move water away from the roadway before it can infiltrate into the road's subbase, increasing the life expectancy of the road surface.
- Shoulders help provide extra structural support of the roadway.
- In some countries, when semi-truck drivers need sleep and there are no available parking spaces at truck stops and rest areas, either because there are no such facilities nearby or because all semi-truck parking spaces are filled to capacity, drivers may pull over to the highway shoulder and sleep in their truck cabin.
- In some countries, parking in the shoulder is not prohibited by the law, and mushroom and berry pickers commonly use them on roads going through a forest.

== General characteristics ==
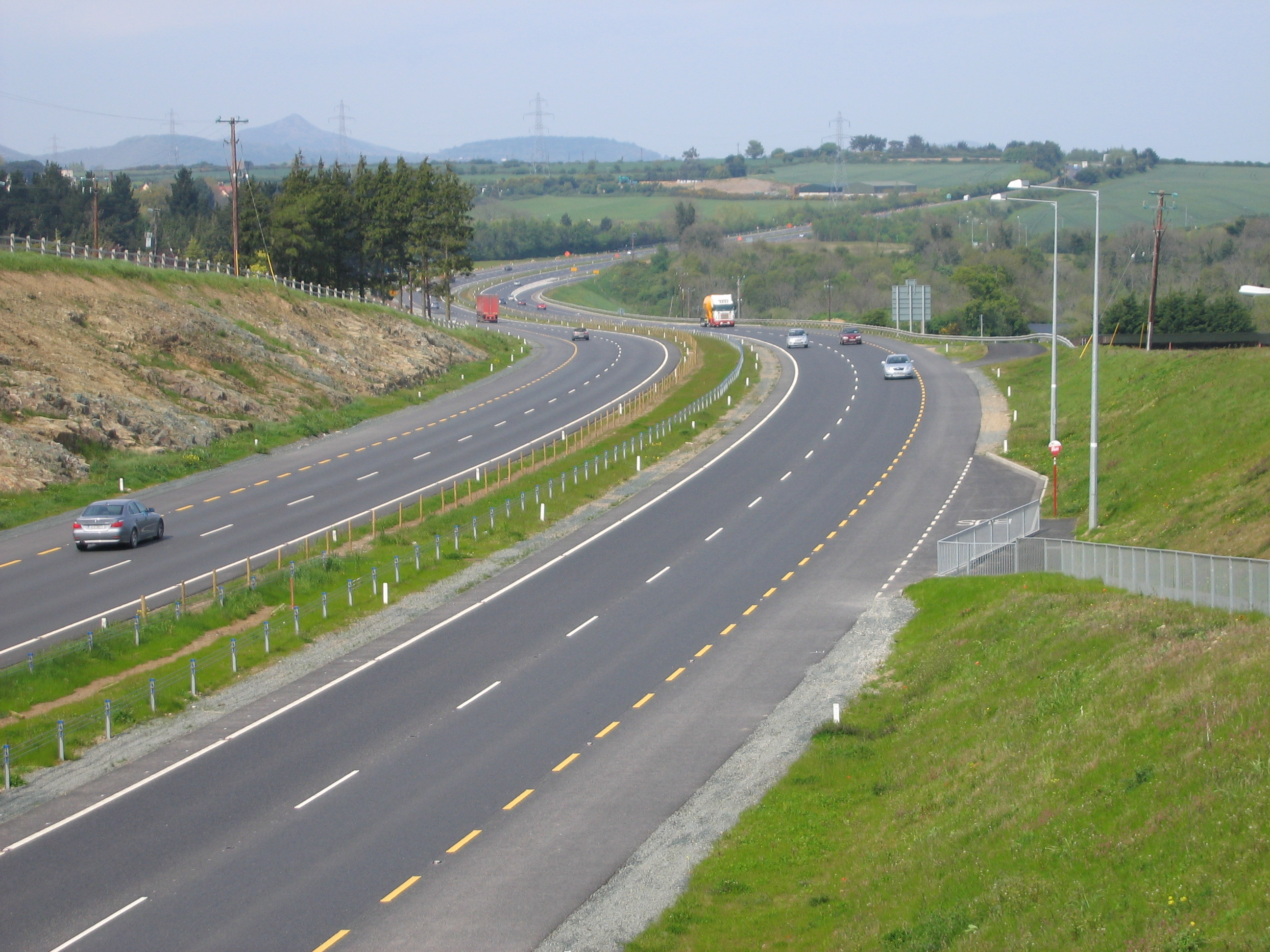
In Ireland, dashed yellow lines demarcate hard shoulders on non-motorways, as can be seen along this dual carriageway on the N11.

The shoulder is usually slightly narrower than a full traffic lane. In some cases, particularly on older rural roadways, shoulders that initially existed were hardened with gravel rather than being paved with asphalt, tarmac or concrete. In Britain, motorway shoulders are now paved, but are still known as "hard shoulders". Older, gravel shoulders have sometimes been termed soft shoulders by comparison. Because the paved surface ends at that point, they are less safe if they need to be used for emergency manoeuvres. Notably, the section of Ontario Highway 401 between Windsor and London had soft shoulders with a sharp slope which was blamed for facilitating vehicle rollovers, if drivers accidentally drifted off the paved section of the road and then overreacted after hitting the gravel. Modern practice is to build a continuous paved shoulder whenever possible.

The US Federal Highway Administration encourages the placement of a Safety Edge—a 30° compacted taper on the end of the pavement drop-off—to ensure that any driver running off the edge of the roadway is better able to maintain control while trying to steer back onto the roadway. The Safety Edge is effective on roads where the shoulder is narrow or non-existent.

To save money, the shoulder was often not paved to the same thickness as the through lanes, so if vehicles were to attempt to use it as a through lane regularly, it would rapidly deteriorate. In Britain, shoulder running can occur during roadworks, and full depth construction is now standard. In some metro areas, road authorities also allow shoulders to be used as lanes at peak periods. However, rural shoulders often collect various bits of road debris that can make driving there less safe.

Drivers will sometimes drift into the shoulder when being overtaken by passing vehicles, particularly on two-lane roads. However, it is extremely unsafe, and in most jurisdictions illegal, to abuse the shoulder by 'undertaking' passing vehicles that are nearer the centre of the road.

On older roads, the shoulder may disappear for short periods, near exits or when going across or under bridges or tunnels where the cost savings were thought to outweigh the safety benefits of the shoulder. Some roads have a narrow shoulder for significant distances. This makes it difficult for large vehicles to pull into the hard shoulder altogether.

The Jingjintang Expressway in north-eastern China is an example of this phenomenon. Its shoulder is only 2.4 metres (7.9 ft) wide, which is not wide enough for some automobiles—a standard lane in the U.S. and UK is 3.7 metres (12 ft). As a result, some motorists are unable to fully exit the mainline when they need to pull over, so they end up in a position that is halfway in the rightmost lane and only partly on the shoulder. The end result is often a traffic jam and occasionally a collision.

== Bus bypass shoulder ==
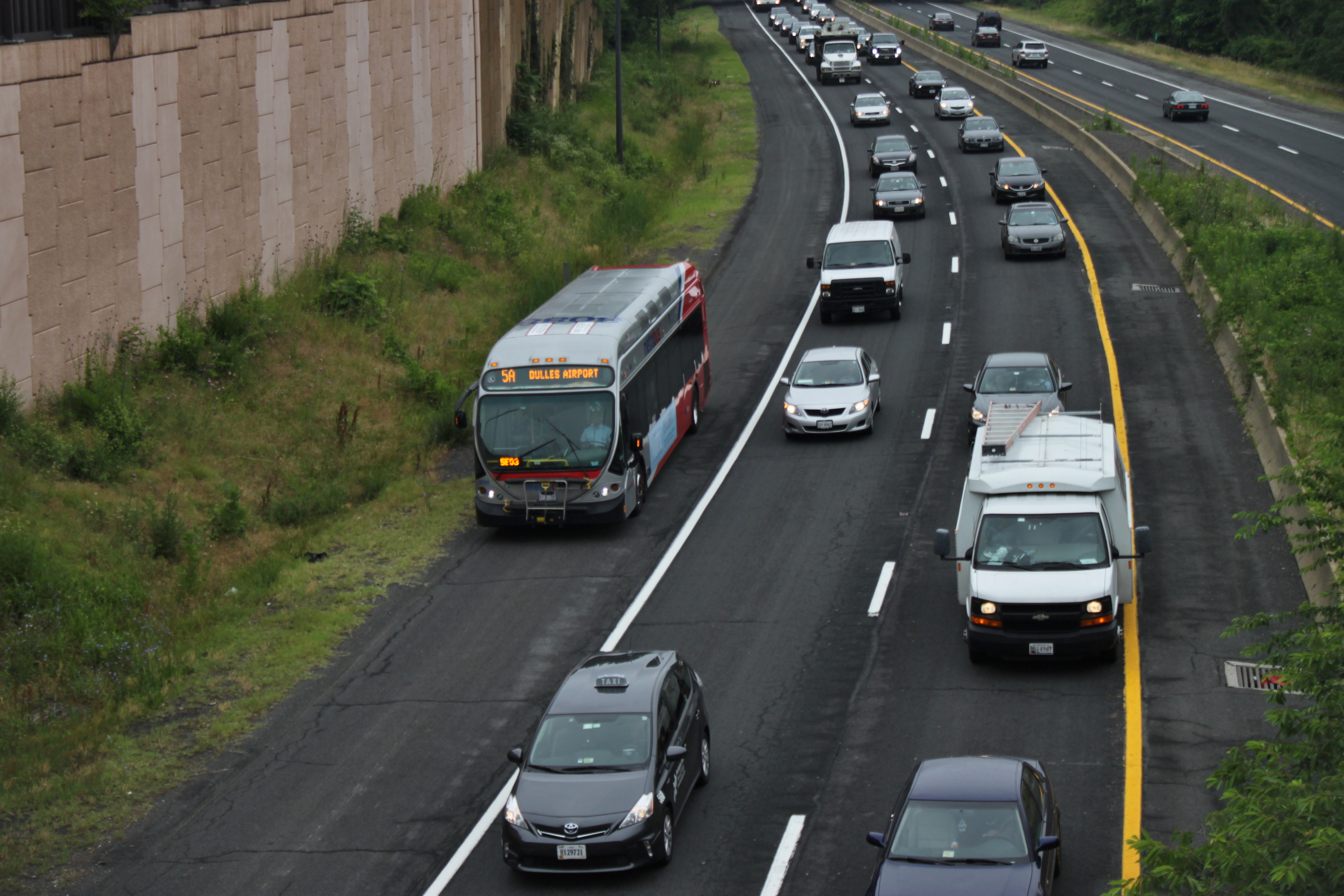
The Dulles Airport Express bypassing traffic using the shoulder lane

In some jurisdictions in the United States and Canada, buses are allowed to drive on the shoulder to pass traffic jams, which is called a bus-only shoulder or bus-bypass shoulder (BBS); the term "bus-only shoulder lane" is incorrect from a technical and legal standpoint. In Ontario, Highway 403 had its shoulders between Hurontario Street and Erin Mills Parkway widened in 2003 so they serve a dual purpose as bus lanes and accident lanes. In the Minneapolis–Saint Paul region of Minnesota, over 430 kilometres (270 mi) of shoulder have been designated for use by buses. The Route 9 BBS in Central New Jersey which runs along two stretches of shoulders are dedicated for exclusive bus use during peak hours. The bus lanes, which run for approximately 4.8 kilometres (3 mi), are the first component of a planned 32-kilometre (20 mi) BBS corridor. In the Chicago area, Pace buses are authorised to use the shoulder of the Jane Addams Memorial Tollway, Edens Expressway, and Stevenson Expressway to avoid delays from traffic congestion.

In the Seattle area, Community Transit and Sound Transit Express commuter buses are authorised to use the shoulders of Interstate 5 and Interstate 405 on small segments in Snohomish County as part of a pilot project that aims to reduce delayed bus trips.

There are also some bus-bypass shoulders in the United Kingdom, on the motorways of Northern Ireland heading towards Belfast and the M90 motorway in Scotland towards Edinburgh.

== Peak period use by all traffic ==
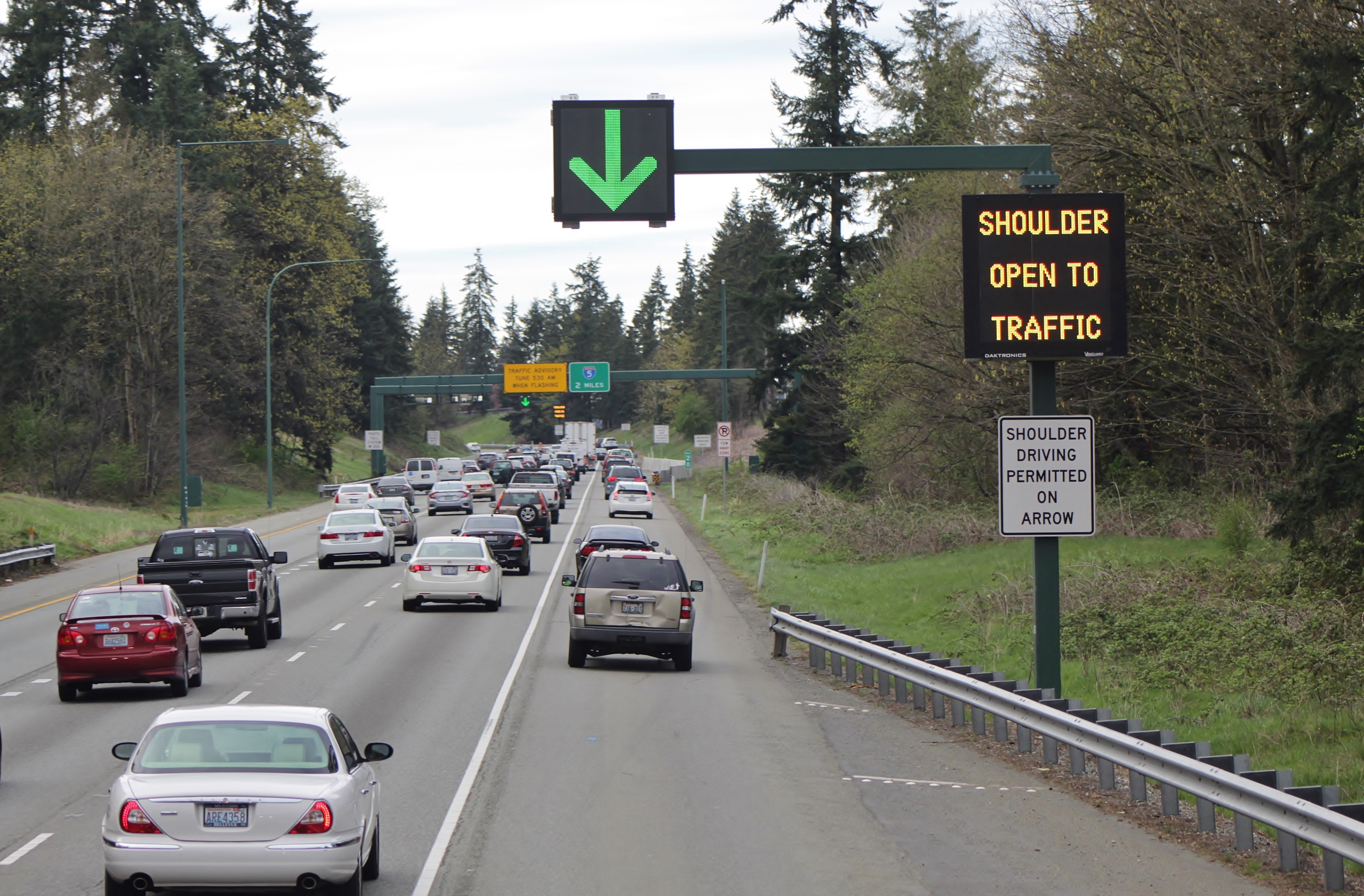
Sign-controlled peak shoulder lane on Interstate 405 near Seattle, Washington, U.S.

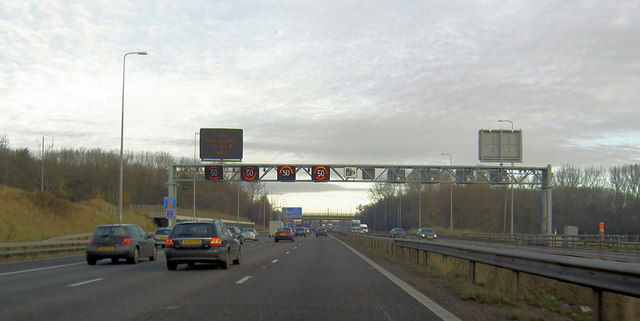
The M42, with lowered speed limits and hard-shoulder running, as seen on the matrix Variable Message Sign (VMS) on the left.

In the United Kingdom, usage of the hard shoulder is known as "hard shoulder running". A pilot project on an 18-kilometre (11 mi) stretch of the M42 motorway, near Birmingham, began in September 2006. Active traffic management with special signage, new laybys and a controlled variable speed limit have been put in place to improve safety. This has proved very successful, with journey times decreasing by 26% northbound and 9% southbound. Drivers can also better predict their journey times as the variability decreased by 27%. The average accident rate dropped from 5.2 to 1.5 per month. It has also proved popular with motorists, 60% of whom want to see it expanded to other English motorways. This 'smart motorway' system has been expanded to the M6, M1 and M25, as well as parts of the M60 and M62.

In the United States, on Interstate 93 between Exit 35 (formerly 41) and Exit 43 (formerly 46) and SR 3 between Exit 27 (formerly 12) and Exit 38 (formerly 16) in the Boston metro area, cars are allowed to use the shoulder as they would a normal lane during morning and evening rush hours. The same scheme is employed elsewhere, such as on Interstate 580 in California on the Richmond-San Rafael Bridge, and on Interstate 405 between SR 527 and I-5 in Bothell.

== Emergency use by all traffic ==
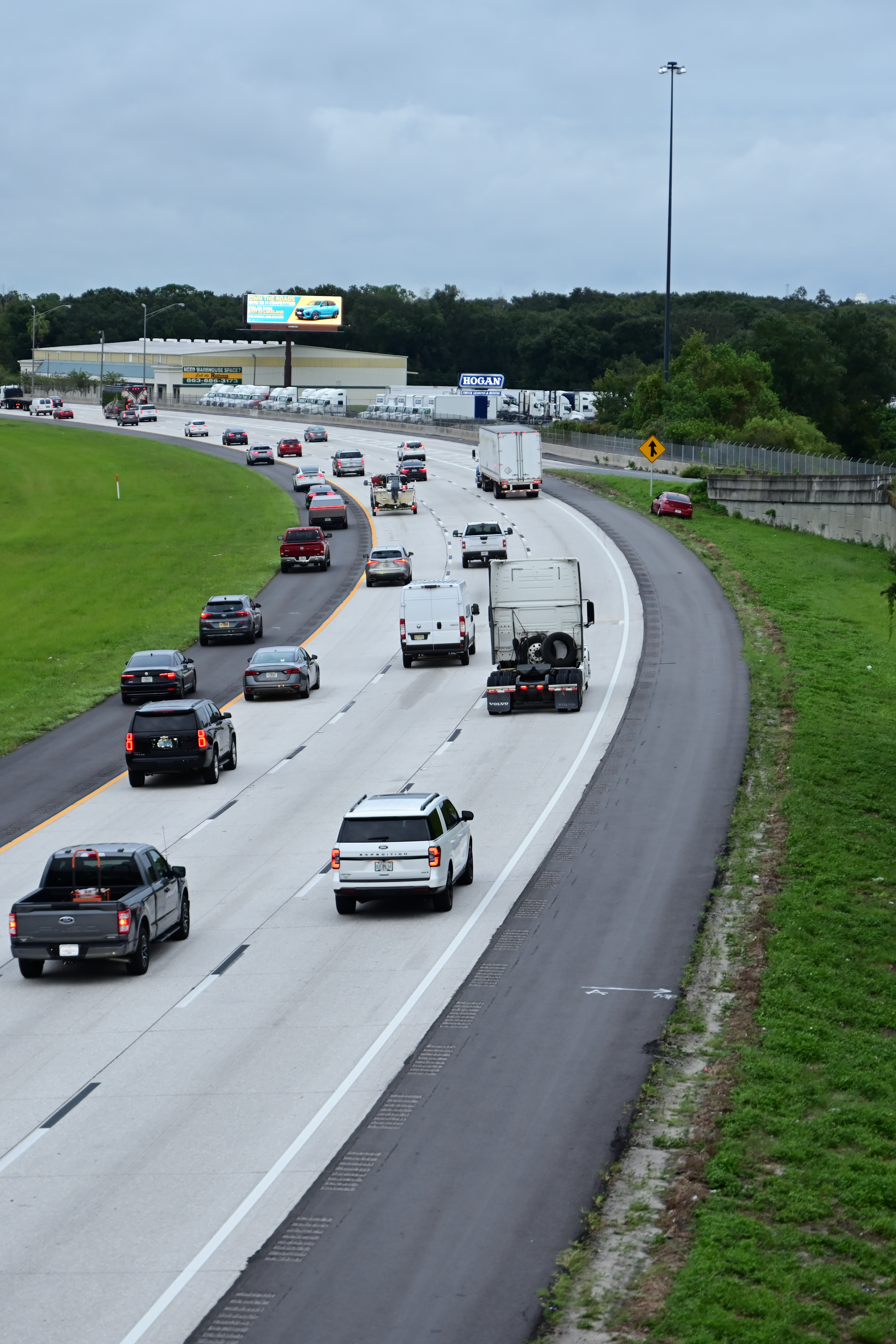
Emergency shoulder use (left shoulder only) on eastbound Interstate 4 prior to the forecast arrival of Hurricane Milton on October 7, 2024

Florida has developed a plan for the use of inside shoulders by moving traffic during hurricane evacuations on portions of Interstate 4 (eastbound from Tampa to Celebration), Interstate 10 (westbound from Jacksonville to Tallahassee), Interstate 75 (northbound from Naples to I-10; both directions from Naples to Ft. Lauderdale), Interstate 95 (northbound from West Palm Beach to near Jacksonville), Florida's Turnpike (northbound from Boynton Beach to Kissimmee and Winter Garden to I-75), and Florida State Road 528 (westbound through rural Orange County). Florida's ESU plan prohibits trucks, busses, and trailers from driving on the shoulder and limits the speed limit to 50 mph on the shoulder, which is typically only 10 feet (3.0 m) wide compared to the standard 12 feet (3.7 m) width of highway travel lanes and contains rumble strips. The shoulder-use plan was implemented in place of labour- and resource-intensive contraflow lane reversal, in which both sides of an interstate highway are used for one direction of traffic.

The first implementation of the plan occurred on 8–9 September 2017 before the arrival of Hurricane Irma. Florida implemented ESU again in October 2024 prior to the arrival of Hurricane Milton, which underwent explosive intensification from a Category 1 into a Category 5 hurricane two days before its forecast landfall on the west central Gulf Coast of Florida as a major hurricane which prompted a large evacuation from the Tampa Bay and Sarasota-Bradenton areas. Texas has also considered emergency shoulder use for hurricane evacuations.

== Increased cyclist safety ==
Although direct rear impacts only make up 3% of motorist-on-cyclist collisions, they are a more prominent collision type in arterial road type situations. When they occur in such circumstances, they are also associated with significantly increased risk of fatality. Data collated by the OECD indicates that rural locations account for 35% or more of cycling fatalities in Denmark, Finland, France, Great Britain, Japan, the Netherlands, and Spain.

The use of appropriately designed segregated space on arterial or interurban routes appears to be associated with reductions in overall risk. In Ireland, the provision of hard shoulders on interurban routes in the 1970s reportedly resulted in a 50% decrease in accidents. It is reported that the Danes have also found that separate cycle tracks lead to a reduction in rural collisions.

In some countries, the use of shoulders is optional for cyclists, who may choose not to use it for reasons such as: it being too narrow, inviting dangerously close passes at high speed by motorists; it having a road surface unsuitable for cycling or putting the path of the cyclist in direct conflict with the paths of other road users, such as those turning across the shoulder. Generally, the usable width of the road begins where one can ride without increased danger of falls, jolts or blowouts. A road may have a gravel shoulder, its edge may be covered with sand or trash and the pavement may be broken.

== Characteristics in various countries ==
=== Australia ===
In a similar manner to Canada, Italy and the United States, the shoulders located on the side of Australia's highways are normally used as an emergency lane in the case of a breakdown or by emergency vehicles in the case of road congestion. However, no mandatory regulations exist to wear a high-visibility jacket when dismounting from the vehicle stopped in an emergency lane.

A recent study conducted by the National Coroners Information System (NCIS) in Australia has revealed 29 closed case fatalities (and at least a dozen case fatalities still under coronial investigation) that had been reported to Australian coroners where a person was "struck in an emergency lane after their vehicle had stopped" between July 2000 and November 2010.

=== Canada and the United States ===
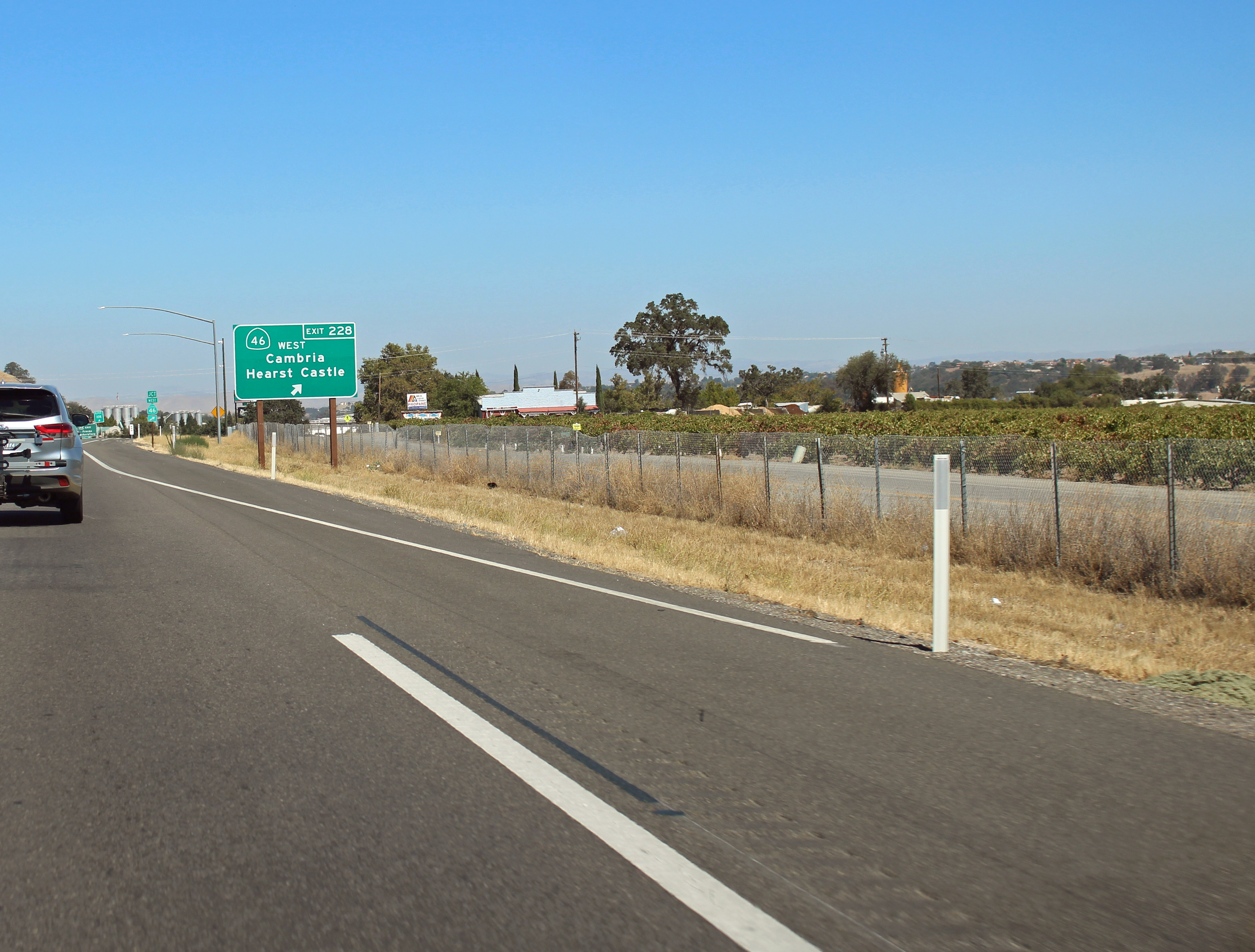
A break in the shoulder line is used by California to warn of upcoming freeway exits in foggy areas

The right-hand shoulder is separated by a solid white line, and the left-hand shoulder (if the road is one-way, such as part of a divided highway) is separated from the leftmost through lane by a solid yellow line. On many roads, the lines are supplemented by reflective raised pavement markers or rumble strips to provide additional visual and tactile feedback to drivers crossing the lines.

On freeways in foggy areas of California, there is an obvious break in the line of the shoulder before every exit. This is to help drivers find their exits in heavy fog (especially the dangerous tule fog).

=== France ===
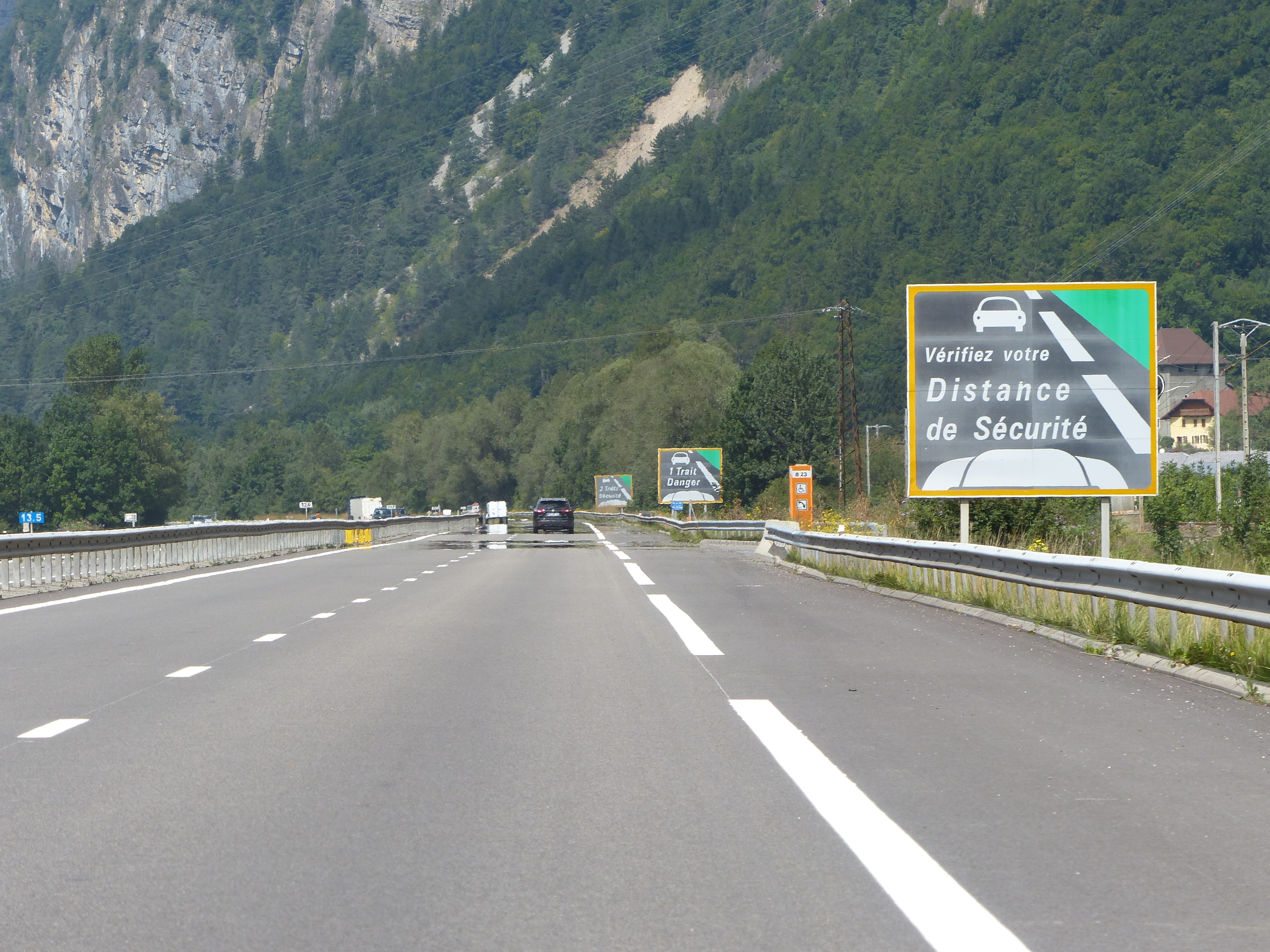
French highway, with dashed shoulder markings and sign explaining their significance

In France, roadway shoulders are usually 2.5 metres (8.2 ft) wide, or 3 metres (10 ft) wide when the roadway carries more than 2,000 vehicles per day. The main difference from other European countries is that the white line is dashed, typically 39 metres (128 ft) long with gaps 13 metres (43 ft) long. The design is intended to provide a guide for drivers to maintain a safe distance between vehicles. Road signs can be found along motorways, to indicate the safe distance (1 line = too close, 2 lines = safe distance). At some points (tunnel, bridge, narrow road with no shoulder, tight curve) the edge line becomes solid.

=== Ireland ===
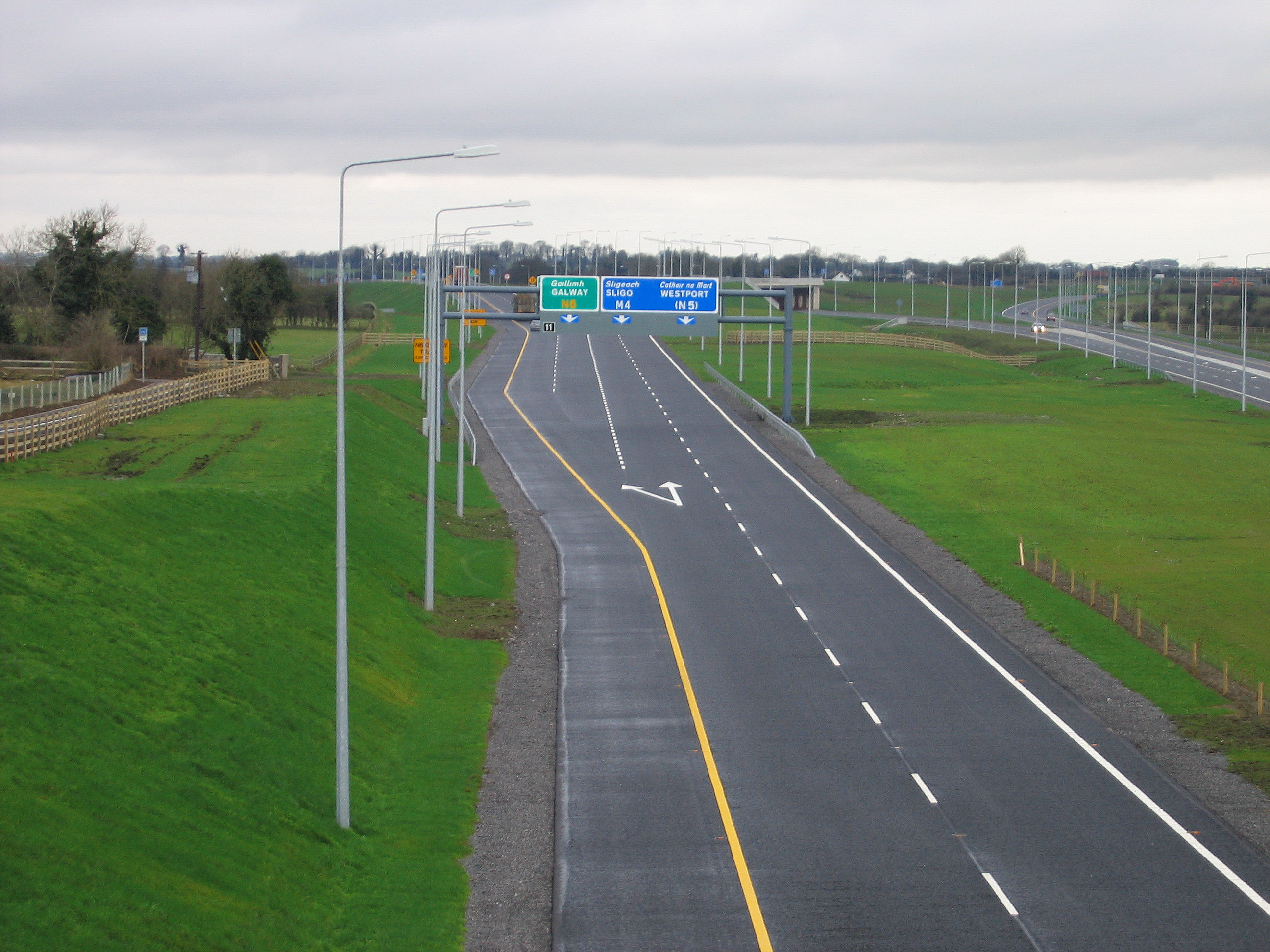
A junction on the M4 motorway in Ireland, with an unbroken yellow line (that peels away and follows the sliproad) demarcating the hard shoulder.

Full-width hard shoulders are provided on most new, upgraded (from the 1980s onwards), and major national roads in the Republic of Ireland, especially on wide two-lane and dual-carriageway roads (the shoulders on most 2+1 roads are narrow however). They are defined within the official document the Rules of the Road as a part of the road that should normally only be used by cyclists and pedestrians. Their provision of on interurban routes in the 1970s reportedly resulted in a 50% decrease in accidents involving pedal cyclists.

The hard shoulder is usually demarcated by road markings in the form of a single dashed yellow line with the addition of yellow cat's eyes. On motorways, and at critical points on other routes (e.g. between junctions or interchanges, or beneath overpasses) a solid yellow line is used, denoting additional restrictions on usage of the hard shoulder. At junctions and on-ramps and off-ramps, the yellow line peels away into the turn, with a dashed white line (with green cats' eyes) denoting a lane division following the main route (i.e. in most cases the road remains the same width, and a turn lane takes the place of the hard shoulder).

In the 2000s, Bus Éireann coaches were allowed to use the hard shoulders on national roads into Dublin. However, dedicated bus lanes are now present on sections of some routes, such as the N7 Naas Road, and such use of actual hard shoulder is not universal.

=== Italy ===
The shoulders located on the sides of Italy's highways are normally used as emergency lanes in case of breakdown or by emergency vehicles in case of queues. According to the regulation in force, it is mandatory to wear a high visibility jacket when dismounting from a vehicle stopped in an emergency lane.

Normally one is not allowed to drive on the shoulder, but in case of traffic blockage, use of the shoulder is allowed to reach an exit if it is within 500 metres.

=== United Kingdom ===
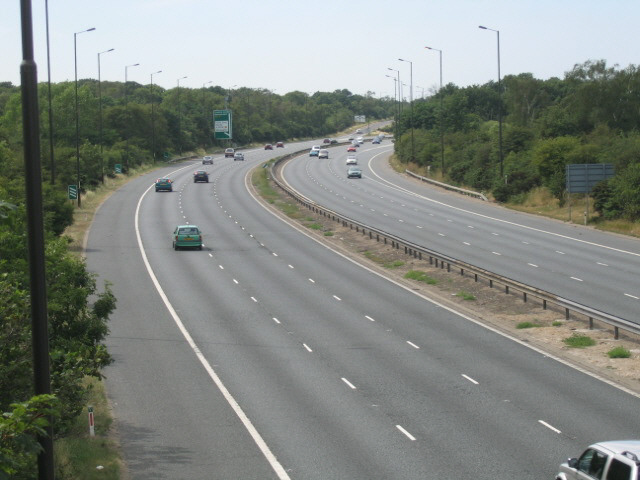
A2 at Leyton Cross, United Kingdom.

Full width hard shoulders are usually provided only on motorways and are usually 3.3 metres (11 ft) wide, but there are exceptions. Some motorways do not have hard shoulders at all (for example the A57(M) and many smart motorways where the hard shoulder has been converted into a running lane, named all lane running smart motorways) and there are a small number of dual carriageway A-roads which do possess hard shoulders (for example, parts of the A1, A2 and A27). Hard shoulders are always marked with a reflecting solid white line which is 20 centimetres (7.9 in) wide and is provided with a rumble strip. A line of red cats' eyes is also used, and is placed to the side of the line.

On many modern non-motorway roads, hard strips are provided. These are usually 1 metre (3.3 ft) wide, and are bounded by thinner solid white lines, and often without a rumble strip.

== See also ==
- Bus lane
- Road verge
- Rumble strip
- Wide outside lane
