= Grazebrook beam engine =

1817 large blower engine

Coordinates: 52.49258°N 1.88818°W

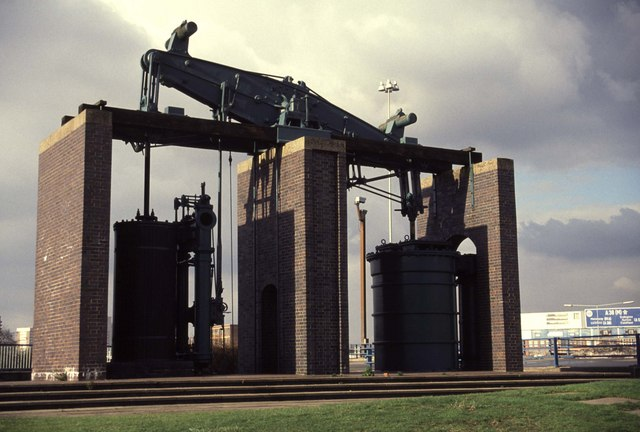
The Grazebrook beam engine.

The Grazebrook Engine is an 1817 beam engine that was used for blowing air over the hot coals of a blast furnace to increase the heat. It is now found as sentinel sculpture on the Dartmouth Circus roundabout at the entrance of the A38(M) in Birmingham, England. It is believed to be the largest steam engine used in Birmingham.

It was built in 1817 to the designs of Watt, who had a foundry in Soho, Birmingham, by Grazebrook & Whitehouse for their Dudley foundry in Dudley, Worcestershire. It provided air for two blast furnaces. In 1912, it was retired, remaining on site as a standby engine. It was dismantled in 1964, and is now displayed on the Dartmouth Circus roundabout at the entrance of the A38(M) (Aston Expressway) and the A4540 (Dartmouth Middleway).

== Technical details ==
This is a typical example of an early nineteenth century engine, it comprises a vertical double acting steam cylinder coupled via an 8 metres (26 ft) rocking beam to a double acting air cylinder.

The beam is made of cast iron; it is 28 feet (8.5 m) long and weighs 10 long tons (10 t). The steam cylinder is 42 inches (1,100 mm) in diameter and has a stroke of 8 feet (2.4 m). It was designed to run at between 12 and 16 strokes per minute. Steam was provided by a bank of six Lancashire boilers. A pressure regulator vessel was fitted to smooth out the air flow. It provided air at 5 pounds per square inch (34 kPa) to two blast furnaces.

The engine house was specially built using lime mortar so that the structure could 'flex' with the movement of the engine.

== M. & W. Grazebrook ==
Grazebrook had a works in Peartree Lane, Netherton, possibly during 1952/53. M. & W. Grazebrook's history can be traced to 1641, when Michael Grazebrook went into business in Stourbridge. The company had a glassworks in Stourbridge, a forge at Halesowen in the 1700s and their own colliery in Coseley. It then focused on iron production and fabrications moving to Netherton in 1800. It was served by the Grazebrook arm of the Dudley Canal.
