= The Middleway =

Ring road in Birmingham, England

A4540

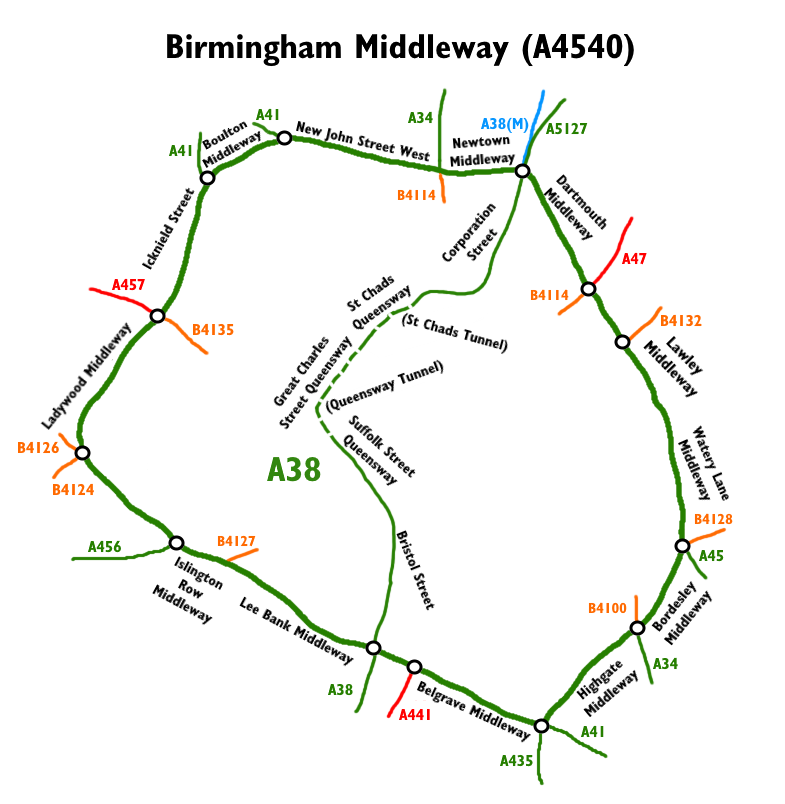
- Map of the Middleway, also showing the A38 which cuts through it

Route information
- Length: 6.5 mi (10.5 km)

Major junctions
- Orbital around Birmingham
- A457; A41; A34; A38; A47; A45; A41; A34 A435 A441; A38 A456

Location
- Country: United Kingdom

Road network
- Roads in the United Kingdom; Motorways; A and B road zones

The Middleway, officially designated as the A4540 and signposted as ring road, is an orbital road in Birmingham, England. Serving as the sole ring road of the city, it runs around Birmingham city centre at a distance of approximately 1 mile (1.6 km). The A38 (including the Queensway tunnels) cuts through it from north to south.

== History ==
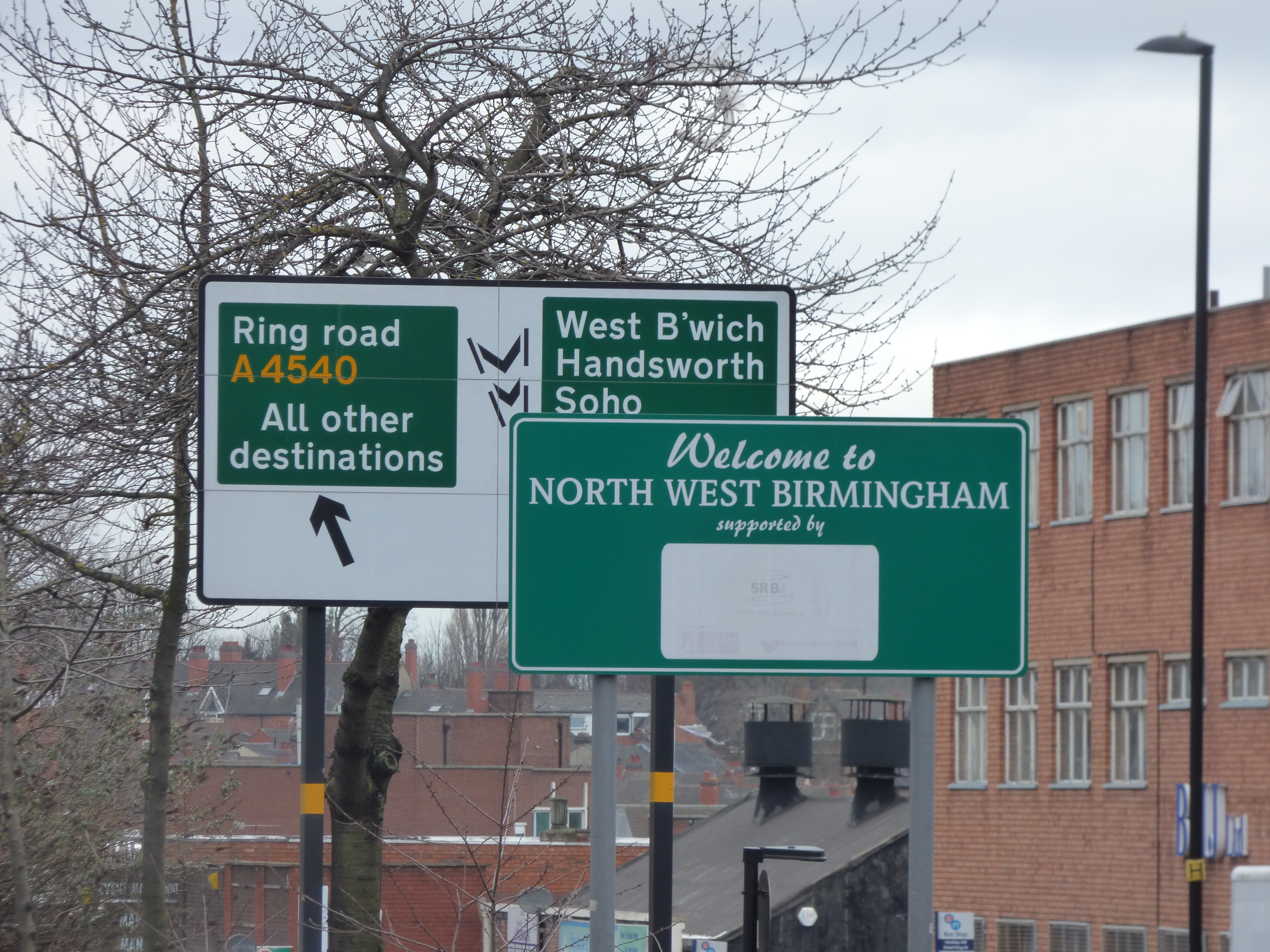
The road is now signposted as simply 'Ring Road'

The ring road was planned and designed by Herbert Manzoni. It was then known as the Middle Ring Road, due to the existence of the now-defunct Inner Ring Road, and as a result it is now often referred to as simply the "Ring Road".

The Middleway forms the boundary to Birmingham Clean Air Zone, although the road itself is not part of the zone.

Plans to make The Middleway a red route were proposed as early as 2008 but dropped in 2021.

== Route ==
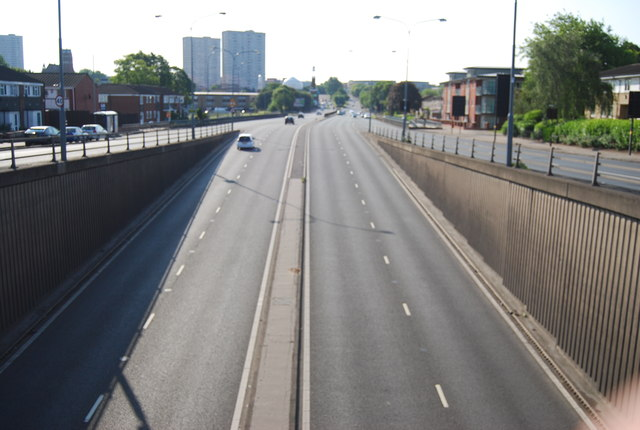
A section of the Middleway

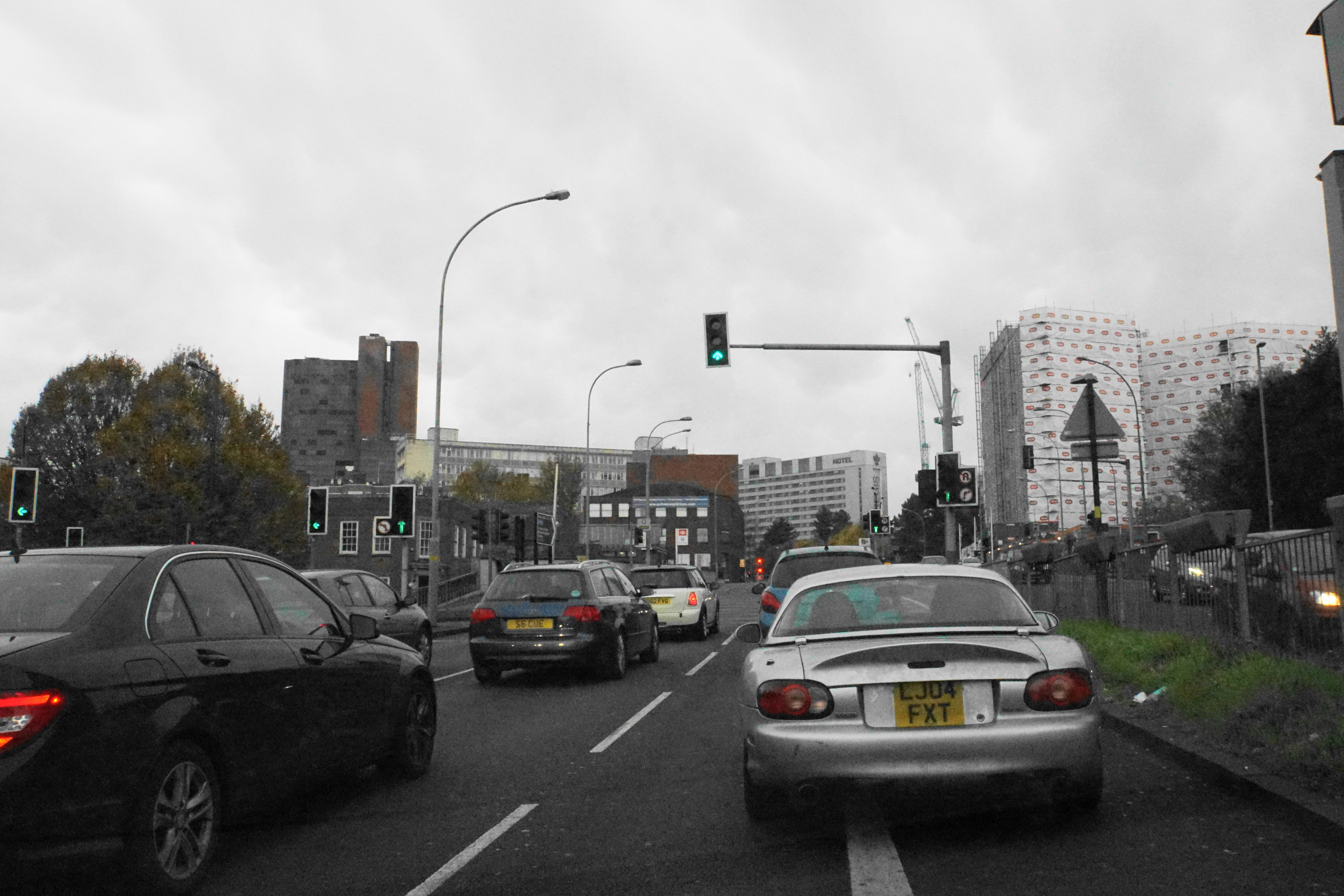
Traffic on Lee Bank Middleway

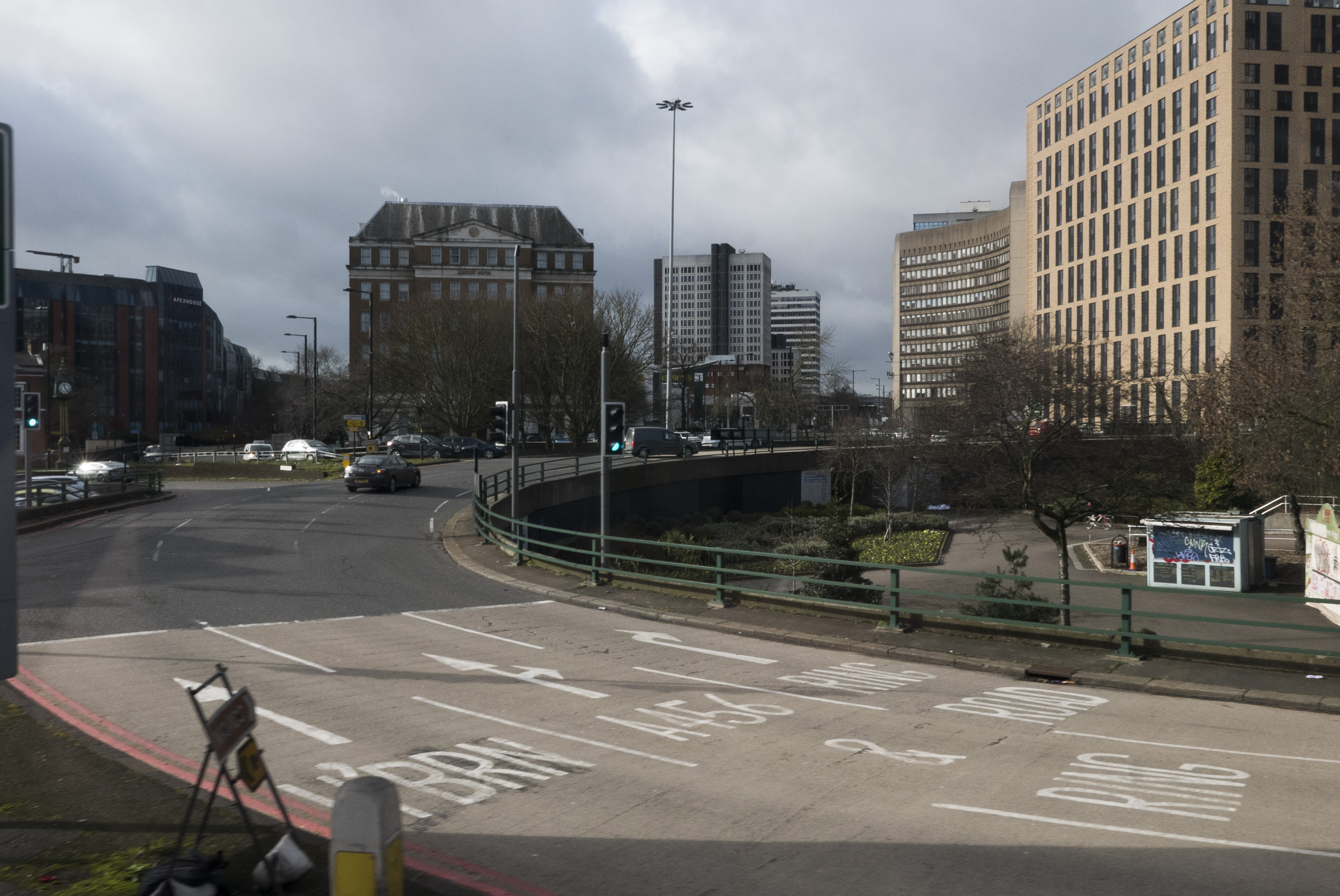
Five Ways Island from No. 23 bus.

The A4540 covers the following route: –

- Dartmouth Circus (Roundabout with Aston Expressway and A38 Lichfield Rd) (Pedestrian subway through roundabout)
- Dartmouth Middleway
- Ashted Circus (junction with A47—with pedestrian subway island)
- Lawley Middleway (with Curzon Circus in the middle)
- Garrison Circus (junction with Garrison Lane)
- Watery Lane Middleway
- Bordesley Circus (junction with A45)
- Bordesley Middleway
- Camp Hill Circus (junction with A41 Stratford Road)
- Highgate Middleway
- Haden Circus (junction with A4167 and A435)
- Belgrave Middleway
- Belgrave Interchange (junction with A441 followed by A38) Main road passes underneath interchange
- Lee Bank Middleway
- Islington Row Middleway
- Five Ways Island (junction with A456 which passes underneath island.) Original plans showed the A4540 as passing under the roundabout but this was later changed, a move which is commonly viewed as a mistake and would have alleviated the heavy congestion at the island. The former Broad St section of the A456, which runs under the island, was downgraded in the 1990s. (Pedestrian subway through island)
- Ladywood Middleway
- Ladywood Circus
- Junction with A457
- Icknield Street
- (Heaton Street, a road which connects the A4540 to Hockley Circus and the junction with the A41)
- Boulton Middleway
- Lucas Circus
- New John Street West
- Junction with A34 Newtown Row
- Newtown Middleway

Heaton Street and New John Street are both numbered A4540 and was the route for all traffic using the Ring Road prior to the construction of the underpass through Snow Hill.

== Pedestrian facilities ==
All but four of the numbered A4540 junctions have signal-controlled pedestrian crossings of the ring road. Of the four, Dartmouth Circus, Ashted Circus and Five Ways have subways; Bordesley Circus has uncontrolled pedestrian crossings despite often heavy traffic. There are mostly lightly used pavements around the entire ring road, though several busy side roads joining the ring road have only uncontrolled crossings for pedestrians. Some parts of the pavement (and the three subways) are designated cycle paths, but much of the rest of the pavement is used by cyclists illegally to avoid the heavy traffic and frequent roundabouts on the ring road.

== Coordinates ==
Location	Coordinate
Northern point	52.49417°N 1.90853°W
Eastern point	52.47457°N 1.87497°W
Southern point	52.46323°N 1.88656°W
Western point	52.47849°N 1.92664°W

== Points of interest ==
The traffic island at Dartmouth Circus houses a preserved Boulton and Watt steam engine, the Grazebrook beam engine.

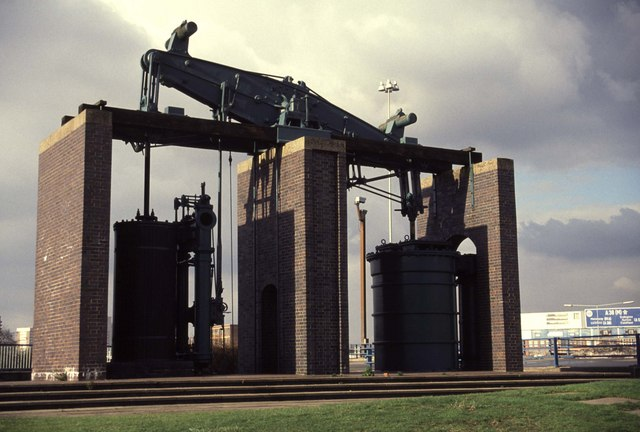
The preserved Grazebrook beam engine at the Dartmouth Circus traffic island

== See also ==
- Queensway/Inner Ring Road
- Transport in Birmingham
