= A435 road =

Road in England

Coordinates: 52.21087°N 1.88145°W

A435

Route information
- Length: 61 mi (98 km)

Major junctions
- North end: Birmingham
- M42 J3 A4540 A4040 A4023 A4189 A448 A422; A46; A40 A426 A429 A417
- South end: Cirencester

Location
- Country: United Kingdom
- Primary destinations: Redditch; Evesham

Road network
- Roads in the United Kingdom; Motorways; A and B road zones

The A435 is a main road in England running between Birmingham and Cirencester (although most of the section between Alcester and just north of Cheltenham has been reclassified as the A46).

== Route ==
=== Birmingham to Alcester ===
The A435 starts on the Birmingham Ring Road, A4540, heading south through the suburbs of Moseley and Kings Heath. A dual carriageway bypasses Wythall before crossing the M42 at junction 3. The road serves the new town of Redditch, yet avoids it to the east. 2 miles (3.2 km) before the village of Studley the road becomes single carriageway again passing through the heart of the village, meeting the A448 road at the other side. Alcester is bypassed to the west, meeting the A46 on the south side of the town. The next 21 miles (34 km) the road is concurrent with the A46.

=== Teddington to Cheltenham ===
At a roundabout near Teddington, the A435 resumes as a non primary route, passing through the centre of Cheltenham, continuing south to eventually cross the A417 and terminating in the centre of Cirencester.

== Former routes ==
In several places the A435 has bypassed towns and villages, or superseded by other routes.

- Hollywood and Wythall
- Portway
- Alcester
- Between Alcester and Evesham, the A435 route was bypassed by a new dual carriageway classified as the A46. The former A435 route passed the villages of Dunnington, Harvington and Norton and is now classified as the B4088.
- Between Evesham and Teddington the existing A435 route was reclassified as the A46

== Historical Places along the route ==
- From a mile north of Studley until Alcester the road runs along path of old Roman road Ryknild Street.
- Coughton Court, stately home run by the National Trust.
- Ragley Hall stately home, the ancestral seat of the Marquess of Hertford.

== Active travel ==
In 2025, construction is expected to start on a dedicated cycle lane along the A435 between Cheltenham and Bishop's Cleeve. It is part of a wider project to provide a cycling route from Bishop's Cleeve to Stroud.

== See also ==
- British road numbering scheme
