= A448 road =

Road in Worcestershire and Warwickshire

Coordinates: 52.33649°N 2.07607°W

A448

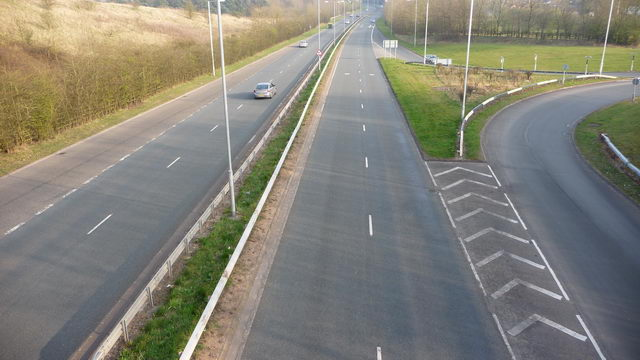
- Bromsgrove Highway in Redditch

Route information
- Length: 19 mi (31 km)

Major junctions
- East end: Studley
- A435 A441 A4189; A38 A449 A451
- West end: Kidderminster

Location
- Country: United Kingdom
- Primary destinations: Redditch; Bromsgrove

Road network
- Roads in the United Kingdom; Motorways; A and B road zones
← A447	→ A449

The A448 is a main road in England running between Studley in Warwickshire and Kidderminster in Worcestershire.

== Route ==
The A448 starts at a fork junction on the A435 just to the South of Studley, heading North West into the new town of Redditch, entering Worcestershire immediately before a roundabout where it meets the A441. For the next 0.8 miles (1.3 km) it is concurrent with the A441, before diverging at England's only Cloverleaf interchange. From this point the A448 heads West on a dual carriageway bypassing the villages of Tardebigge and Finstall. The dual carriageway ends on a roundabout with the A38 Bromsgrove Bypass. It continues through the congested town centre and out of the other side, passing under the M5. It is now a twisty single carriageway road passing through several villages before entering Kidderminster. It crosses the A449 at traffic lights, and descends past Kidderminster station and Severn Valley Railway to meet the Ring Road.

== Former routes ==
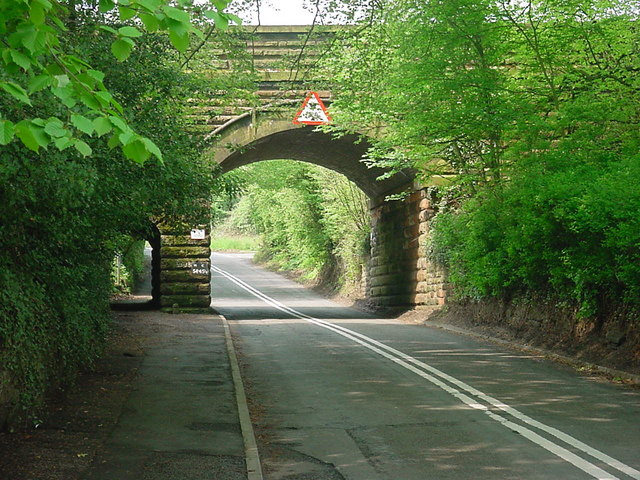
The former A448 in Finstall

- Through Redditch the A448 used to follow now unclassified roads on the South Side of the new town, changes coming during the 1970s when new dual carriageways (or Highways) were built to deal with the rising volume of traffic following the town's growth.
- Between Redditch and Bromsgrove the villages of Tardebigge and Finstall have been bypassed
- The A448 used to be concurrent with the A38 along Bromsgrove High Street

== Places of interest ==
- Severn Valley Railway
- Tardebigge Locks
- Lickey Incline

== See also ==
- Great Britain road numbering scheme
