= B roads in Zone 4 of the Great Britain numbering scheme =

The numbering zones for roads in Great Britain

B roads are numbered routes in Great Britain of lesser importance than A roads. See the article Great Britain road numbering scheme for the rationale behind the numbers allocated.

== 3 digits ==
Road	From	To	Notes
B400	A4 Fleet Street	A40 Holborn	Chancery Lane. One way only Northbound
B401	A40 High Holborn	B402 Long Acre	Endell Street. One way only Southbound. Formerly included Bow Street and Wellington Street further south.
B402	A400 Charing Cross Road	A4200 Kingsway	Road Names: Cranbourn Street, Long Acre, Great Queen Street. One-way westbound along Cranbourn Street; one-way eastbound along Long Acre.
B403 (defunct)	A40 New Oxford Street, London	B401 Endell Street, London	Now part of the A40 one-way system.
B404	A401 Shaftesbury Avenue	A400 Charing Cross Road	Road Names: Monmouth Street, Upper St Martin's Lane, St Martin's Lane. One-way southbound. Crosses Seven Dials and south end is near St Martin-in-the-Fields, the National Gallery and Trafalgar Square.
B405	A4204 Palace Gardens Terrace, near Notting Hill Gate	A4204 Kensington Church Street	Road Names: Palace Gardens Terrace, Vicarage Gate. Originally ran along the north side of Trafalgar Square; later upgraded to a loop off the A4. The section along Trafalgar Square is now pedestrianized and the remainder is part of the A4.
B406	A5204 Wigmore Street, Marylebone	A4201 Regent Street, Mayfair	Road Names: Welbeck Street, Henrietta Place, Vere Street, New Bond Street, Conduit Street. One-way southbound except along Conduit Street.
B407 (defunct)	A4 (now A315) Kensington High Street, London	A40 Holland Park Avenue, London	Upgraded to Class I status as a portion of the A3220. Southern third is now one-way northbound.
B408	A315 King Street, Hammersmith	A4020 Shepherd's Bush	Road Names: Dalling Road, Paddenswick Road, Askew Road. South part of Dalling Road is one-way southbound.
B409	A402 Goldhawk Road, Stamford Brook	B490 at Acton Green	Road Names: Stamford Brook Road, Bath Road, South Parade
B410	A402 Bayswater Road	A4205 Praed Street at Paddington station	Road Names: Leinster Terrace, Craven Hill, Craven Road
B411	A402 Bayswater Road	A404 Harrow Road	Road names: Queensway, Porchester Road, Lord Hills Bridge. Also includes Inverness Place and Inverness Terrace, for one-way southbound traffic (south part of Queensway is one-way northbound).
B412	A219 Shepherd's Bush	A4207 Notting Hill	To the West of Ladbroke Grove it follows North Pole Road, St Quentin Avenue, St Marks Road and Cambridge Gardens. To the East, through Westbourne Park Road. Crosses Portobello Road.
B413	A5 Maida Vale	B450 Chamberlayne Road	In two parts: Maida Vale to Kilburn Park Road, and Kilburn Park Road to Kensal Green. Via Warwick Avenue Underground station. Road Names: Clifton Road, Clifton Gardens, Warwick Avenue, Formosa Street, Shirland Road, Carlton Vale, Kilburn Lane
B414	A5 Maida Vale	A404 Harrow Road at Westbourne Green	Road Names: Kilburn Park Road, Walterton Road, Fernhead Road
B415	A4206 Pembridge Road, near Notting Hill Gate	B450 Ladbroke Grove	Road Names: Kensington Park Road, Elgin Crescent
B416	A4 Wellington Street / A332 roundabout at Slough	A413 Amersham Road at Gerrards Cross	
~~B417~~ - ~~B423~~	unused		
B424 (defunct)			Possible typo for the B454.
B425	A45 in Sheldon, West Midlands	A41 in Solihull	
B430	A34 at Weston-on-the-Green	M40 at Ardley	The original route of the A43.
~~B431~~ - ~~B438~~	unused		
B439	A46 at Salford Priors	A4390 at Stratford-upon-Avon	Formerly the A439
B440	A4146 and A505 roundabout at Leighton Buzzard	A4146 and A4147 in Hemel Hempstead	Downgraded non-primary section of the A4146, created in 2017 as part of a wider renumbering related to the A5 Dunstable bypass.
~~B441~~ - ~~B449~~	unused		
B450	A402 at Holland Park	B451 at Kensal Rise	Much of this is Ladbroke Grove in Notting Hill and passes close to Portobello Road market.
B451	A404 at Kensal Green	A5 at Kilburn	Via Kensal Green railway station. Road Names: College Road, Mortimer Road, Harvist Road, Brondesbury Road
B452	A3002 at Brentford	A40 at Perivale	Via Brentford railway station, Northfields Underground station and West Ealing railway station. Road Names: Windmill Road, Northfield Avenue, Drayton Green Road, Argyle Road, Teignmouth Gardens Originally ran from Willesden to Neasden. Upgraded to Class I status as the A4088 in the mid-1920s.
B453	A407, Willesden High Road, Willesden	A4088, Neasden Junction	Passes Neasden Underground Station (Jubilee line)
B454	A315 at Isleworth	A4127 at Southall	Via Syon Lane railway station, and crosses Osterley Park. Road Names: Spur Road, Syon Lane, Windmill Lane.
B455	A315 at Brentford	A312/A4180 roundabout at Yeading	Via South Ealing Underground station and Ealing Broadway railway station. Road Names: Ealing Road, South Ealing Road, Saint Mary's Road, Ealing Green, Bond Street, Ealing High Street, Ealing Broadway, Haven Green, Castlebar Road, Castlebar Hill, Kent Gardens, Scotch Common, Ruislip Road East, Greenford Broadway, Ruislip Road. Haven Green, Ealing Broadway and Ealing High Street are one-way southbound; Bond Street is one-way northbound.
B456	A40 Western Avenue	A4005 at Alperton	Road Name: Alperton Lane
B457 (defunct)	A4005 at Roxeth	A312 at Harrow	Now part of a rerouted A4005.
B458 (defunct)	A404 in Harrow	A4005 in Harrow	Declassified as it is within Harrow's ring road, and is now one-way westbound.
B459 (defunct)	A410 in Harrow Wield	A410 in Stanmore	Declassified after the 1990s.
B460 (defunct)	A410 in Hatch End	A41 in Oxhey	Upgraded to Class I status as the A4008 in the 1940s.
B461	A4140 at Stanmore	A5 at Edgware	Whitchurch Lane, past Canons Park station
B462	A411 at Bushey Arches	A5183 at Radlett	
B463 (defunct)	A404 in Pinner	A410 in Pinner	Declassified after the 1990s after the rerouting of the A404 north of Pinner.
B464 (defunct)	A312 north of Harlington	A40 (now A4020) in Hillingdon	Renumbered to A437; the southernmost section is unclassified.
B465	A4020 at Hillingdon	A408 at Stockley Park	Road Name: West Drayton Road
B466	A4020 at Hillingdon	A404 at Pinner	Via West Ruislip railway station. Road Names: Long Lane, Ickenham High Road, Ickenham Road, Eastcote Road, Eastcote High Road, Cuckoo Hill
B467	A4020 at Uxbridge	B466 at Ickenham	Road Names: Harefield Road, Swakeleys Road
B468 (defunct)	A404 near Northwood	A40 (now A411) in Oxhey	Upgraded to Class I status as the A4125.
B469	A404 at Northwood	A4215 at Northwood	Via Northwood Underground station. Road Name: Green Lane
B470	A408 at Cowley	A4 at Windsor	Via Langley railway station.
B471	Pangbourne, Berkshire	A4074 at Woodcote, Oxfordshire	Originally ran from Iver Heath to Denham (now the A412). The northernmost section was later cut in two by the M40 and the old B471, Southlands Road, now goes nowhere.
B472	A404 at Northwood Hills	B466 at Eastcote	Via Northwood Hills Underground station. Road Name: Joel Street First used from Slough to Chalfont St Peter; this was upgraded in the 1920s to a portion of a rerouted A332. Reused along old B473 from Beaconsfield to Amersham when the B473 was rerouted to Hazelmere, but became the B473 (now A355) again in 1935.
B473 (defunct)	A4 at Slough	A413 in Amersham	Rerouted to Hazelmere when the A332 replaced the original B472, with the original route to Beaconsfield renumbered to B472. In 1934 the B473 was proposed to be extended south along the B3027, replacing the B474 as a spur to the A332, and rerouted along the B472 to Amersham, with the Beaconsfield-Hazelmere section numbered as a B road (not as B472, however). The extension south was rejected in January 1935 as it would have put the B473 out-of-zone, but the other proposals proceeded as planned and were implemented in April 1935. The Beaconsfield-Hazelmere section was numbered as the B474. Due to an increase of traffic, the B473 was upgraded to Class I status as an extension of the A355 in the 1970s.
B474	A40 at Beaconsfield	A404 at Hazlemere	Former portion of B473. Originally ran from Stoke Poges to Farnham Royal; it was renumbered as a spur of the B473 in 1935. Now part of the B416.
B475 (defunct)	A4 in Slough	Slough railway station	Declassified in the 1960s when the A4 was rerouted.
B476 (defunct)	A4 near Taplow	A32 (now A4094) in Wooburn	Downgraded because it paralleled the A4094. Now MC61 and C172.
B477	A4 at Hare Hatch	A321 at Wargrave	Narrow with virtually no white line markings in centre of road.
B478	A4 road at Charvil	A4155 (former A32)	via Sonning
B479 (defunct)	A32 in Caversham	A423 in Benson	Originally ended at the A42 in Streatley, but was rerouted in the 1930s to Benson, with the old route becoming B4526 and B4008 (now B4009). When the A423 was cut in half by the runway at RAF Benson, the B479 was rerouted out of Benson entirely. The section between Benson and the A4130 at Crowmarsh Gifford became a portion of a rerouted A423 in the 1960s with the remainder upgraded to the A4074, which would also replace the A423 after it was rerouted.
B480	A4130 Fair Mile, Henley-on-Thames	The Plain, Oxford	
B481	A4155 Caversham	B480 just south of Watlington	Connects Reading to B4009 at Watlington and hence the M40 2.5miles north of Watlington
B482	A4155 Marlow	A40 Stokenchurch	By way of Lane End, Bolter End and Cadmore End
B483	A4020 at Uxbridge	A40 at Ickenham	Road Name: Park Road
B484 (defunct)	A416 at High Wycombe railway station	A416 at Wycombe Abbey	Became a portion of the A404 in 1935.
B485	A416 at Chesham	A413 at Great Missenden	
B486	B4635 in Tring	B488 in Tring	Former portion of the B488 before it was rerouted. Originally ran from Boxmoor to Leighton Buzzard (now A4146, A4012 and B440).
B487	Hemel Hempstead	A1081 in Harpenden	
B488	Aston Clinton, Tring	A4146 south of Leighton Buzzard,	Begins at a grade separated junction east of Aston Clinton.
B489	B4009 at Aston Clinton	A5/A505 at Dunstable	Formerly started on the A41, now crosses the bypassed A41 and starts in Aston Clinton on the B4009.
B490	A315 at Chiswick	A4020 at Acton	Via Chiswick Park Underground station. Road Names: Acton Lane, Beaconsfield Road, Acton Lane, Winchester Street
B491	A315 at Chiswick	B490 near Acton	Via Turnham Green Underground station. Road Names: Turnham Green Terrace, The Avenue, Southfield Road
B492 (defunct)	A40 in Acton	A4000 in Acton	Now part of the A4000 one-way system.
~~B493~~ - ~~B499~~	unused		

== B4000 to B4099 ==
Road	From	To	Notes
B4000	A4/A34 at Speen, Berkshire	A361 at Highworth, Wiltshire	Via Lambourn, Ashbury and Shrivenham
B4001	A4 at Hungerford, Berkshire	A417 north of West Challow	Via Lambourn
B4002 (defunct)	New Road, Marlborough	The Common, Marlborough	Now part of the A346.
B4003	A4 near West Overton	A4361 at Avebury	Single track throughout length.
B4004 (defunct)	A361 in Broad Hinton	A420 in Wootton Bassett	Renumbered as a southern extension of the B4041 in 1935. Now unclassified.
B4004 (defunct)	A48 in Coldra	B4237 in Newport	The former classification of Ringland Way in Newport. Upgraded to Class I status as the A455 by 1968 and is now part of a rerouted A48 as a portion of the Southern Distributor Road.
B4005	M4 J16 at Swindon and Wootton Bassett	A346 road east of Chiseldon	Via Wroughton
B4006	A3102 in West Swindon	A4361 north of Wroughton	Incomplete orbital route through suburbs of Swindon. Begins west of the centre as part of Great Western Way then orbits north and east, becoming Dorcan Way in the east, and continues through southern suburbs.
B4007 (defunct)	A415 on Harcourt Hill	A417 in Harwell	Due to its importance, it was renumbered to A4130 in the early 1930s. The eastern end became a portion of a rerouted A423, but later returned to the A4130 after the A423 was rerouted in the 1990s. A small section in Didcot is now the B4016 and the section between Didcot and Harwell is now the B4493.
B4007 (defunct)	A329 Broad Street, Reading	A4155 Caversham Road, Reading	via Queen Victoria Street, Station Road and Tudor Road; declassified by the 1980s.
B4008	Stroud	Quedgeley	Formerly part of the A419. Originally ran from Crowmarsh Gifford to Benson. Extended south via North Stoke to the B479 in Goring in the late 1920s. The section north of Crowmarsh Gifford (including the entire original section) became part of a rerouted B479 in the early 1930s and the section of old B479 between Goring and the A42 at Streatley became a portion of the B4008. This became a portion of an extension of the B4009 in 1935.
B4009	A4 / A339 at Newbury	A41 at Tring, Hertfordshire	Exists in two sections, connected by the A4074.
B4011	A418 at Thame	A41 near Bicester	Via Long Crendon. Turnpiked in 1833.
B4012	A40 at Postcombe	A4129 at Thame	Forms eastern bypass for Thame. Originally met B4011 in town centre.
B4013 (defunct)	A4074 in Shillingford	A418 west of Thame	Upgraded to the A329 when the M40 opened.
B4014	A429 north of Malmesbury	A46 at Nailsworth	Via Tetbury and Avening; formerly part of the A434. Originally ran from Oxford to Stadhampton. Renumbered as a western extension of the B480 in 1935.
B4015	A415 Clifton Hampden	B480 Chiselhampton	
B4016	B4017 Drayton	A417 Blewbury	Via Sutton Courtenay, Appleford-on-Thames and East Hagbourne
B4017	B4044 Farmoor	A4130 Milton Hill	Via Cumnor, Abingdon and Drayton. The section of road between Abingdon and Milton Hill was formerly part of the A34.
B4018 (defunct)	B4017 Bath Street, Abingdon	A34 Stert Street, Abington	Ran along Broad Street. Became a spur of the B4017 in 1935 and the A415 in the 1950s. It is now unclassified and mostly pedestrianized.
B4018 (defunct)	A4059 Brecon Road, Hirwaun	A465 in Cwm Ynys-Mintan	Former section of the A465 east of Hirwaun, designated in 1965 when the Heads of the Valleys Road opened. Now unclassified.
B4019	Faringdon, Oxfordshire	A419 at Broad Blunsdon, Wiltshire	Via Highworth
B4020	A40 at Burford	A4095 at Clanfield	Originally continued along present A4095 to Faringdon. Diverted from previous route when runway at RAF Brize Norton extended.
B4021 (defunct)	B4020 in Clanfield	A40 near Witney	Upgraded to Class I status as a portion of the A4095 in the mid-1920s.
B4021 (defunct)	A420 at Stratton Park	A419 near Broad Brunston	Trunked in 1946 (designated T43) and became a portion of the A419 shortly after. The route has since been bypassed, although the central section is now the B4006.
B4021 (defunct)	Rectory Road, Rickmansworth	Church Street, Ricksmanworth	Included a spur along Station Road; formerly the A404 and A412 before they were rerouted out of town. Now unclassified.
B4022	A40 at Cogges, Oxfordshire	A361 near Great Tew	Via Witney, Charlbury and Enstone. The former route of the A40 between Cogges and Witney
B4023 (defunct)	A40 Tower Hill, Witney	A40 High Street, Witney	Became a portion of a rerouted A40 in 1930. The route is now part of the A4095 after the Witney bypass was built.
B4023 (defunct)	A419 (now A41) and B4070 (now unclassified) at the Air Balloon roundabout	A40 in Andoversford	Upgraded to Class I status as the A436 in 1935.
B4024	B4215 near Dymock	A449 in Much Marcle	Originally ran from the A40 at Witney to the A42 near Woodstock. Like many of the B402x roads, it was upgraded to the A4095 in the mid-1920s. The last quarter-mile section however became the A4114 because the A4095 replaced the B4025, instead of the B4024, at the Woodstock end. This later became a spur of the A4095 and is now unclassified.
B4025	A34 in Hall Green, Birmingham	A41 at Solihull	First used between the B4024 and A42 south of Woodstock. Upgraded early on (before 1925) to Class I status as the A4095. Next used in 1925 along an old section of the A38 to the east of Norton. Appears on maps up to 1934, but not on 1936 or 1937 maps. Downgraded to a C-road by the 1940s and is now little more than a farm track.
B4026	A3400 (old A34) near Over Norton	B4437 in Charlbury	Previously continued to B4022.
B4027	A40 at Wheatley	A44 at Glympton	By way of Beckley. Also used in Warwickshire between Binley and Cross in Hand. This was previously the B4114, then upgraded to the A4114 in the 1940s and renumbered to the A427 in the 1960s and had the B4027 number by the 1990s, probably for continuity, but because the number was in use elsewhere, it was renumbered to the B4428 in the 2000s.
B4028	B4228 in Coleford	A4136 at Edge End	Prior to construction of Coleford relief road, met B4228 in Market Place. Via Mile End. First used from the A42 (now A44) in Woodstock to the A423 (now A4260) at Sturdy's Castle. Declassified in the mid-1920s due to completion of the A4095, which ran parallel to the B4028.
B4029	B4113 at Bedworth	B4428 near Brinklow	Via Bulkington. Previously continued along present B4455 to Brinklow. Continued along now unclassified road to Ryton. Originally ran from the B4027 at Enslow to the B4030 west of Bicester. Like many of the B402x roads, it was upgraded to the A4095 in the mid-1920s, however it did not follow Akeman Road between Kirtlington and Chesterton but followed the next road north. The section along Akeman Road was declassified instead.
B4030	A44 near Enstone	B4100 at Bicester Town Centre	Via Church Enstone, Gagingwell, Westcott Barton, Middle Barton, Bartongate, Hopcroft's Holt, Lower Heyford and Middleton Stoney. Turnpiked in 1797 and disturnpiked in 1876.
B4031	A361 near Great Tew	A43 near Croughton, Northamptonshire	Via Deddington
B4032	A413 near Winslow	A4146 at Linslade	
B4033	A413 near Winslow, Buckinghamshire	A421 near Nash, Buckinghamshire	
B4034	A421 in south western Milton Keynes	A422 in northern Milton Keynes	Concurrent with V8 Marlborough Street from A422/H3 Monks Way to A421/H8 Standing Way. Concurrent with V7 Saxon Street from A421 to Brunel Roundabout, Bletchley. From this roundabout the road heads west to meet with the A421 and the southern terminus of V1 Snelshall Street.
B4035	Banbury	A4184 in Evesham	Via Broughton, Tadmarton, Swalcliffe, Brailes, Shipston-on-Stour, Chipping Campden, Bretforton and Badsey
B4036	Daventry	A5 at Long Buckby Wharf	Formerly continued to Market Harborough via Naseby, site of the English Civil War battle of that name, and ran close to a junction with the A14 and M1 junction 18
B4037	A361 at Badby	A45 near Dodford	Via Newnham.
B4038	A361/A5 at Kilsby	A428 at Hillmorton	Can be accessed from the A5 or A361. Formerly much longer as it continued along what is now part of the A361 between Daventry and Kilsby. Today the road is only about 3 miles (5 km) long, linking Kilsby and Rugby, whilst bypassing J18 of the M1.
B4039	A420 west of Chippenham	B4040 at Acton Turville	
B4040	A46 at Old Sodbury, South Gloucestershire	A419 at Cricklade, Wiltshire	Via Malmesbury
B4041	A419 in Cricklade, Wiltshire	A4361 near Broad Hinton, Wiltshire	Via Wootton Bassett. Originally ended at the A420 (now A3102) at Wooton Bassett, but was extended over the B4004 to Broad Hinton in 1935. Declassified in the late 1980s, but the northernmost section, from Cricklade to north of Purton, is now part of the B4553.
B4042	A429 in Malmesbury, Wiltshire	A3102 in Wootton Bassett, Wiltshire	
B4043	A458 in Quinton, West Midlands	A456 in Halesowen, West Midlands	Originally ran along Midland Bridge Road in Bath. The route was put out-of-zone when the A4 was extended north in 1935 and was renumbered to B3118 as a result. The northern end is now part of the A367 due to later developments in Bath.
B4044	A420 at Botley	A40 at Eynsham	Passes over Swinford Toll Bridge. Part of the A40 until the 1930s, later renumbered as the A4141. Originally ran along Newbridge Road in Bath. Upgraded to a portion of the A4 in 1935.
B4045 (defunct)	A36 in Keynsham	A431 at Willsbridge	Became a portion of the B4427 in the 1935 renumbering, and is now part of the A4175.
B4045 (defunct)			Appears in the 2005 DfT list as "Link in Malmesbury". The road does not exist, but it may have before the A429 bypass was built, although there is no obvious location for the road.
B4046	A420 in Kingswood, South Gloucestershire	A431 in Hanham	
B4047	Witney, Oxfordshire	A40 west of Minster Lovell	Former route of the A40. Originally ran from Warmley to Fishponds. In the 1935 renumbering, the section from Warmley to Staple Hill was renumbered to B4427 (now A4175) and the remainder to B4465. The southern section was split in two by the A4174 and is now unclassified and closed to through traffic.
B4048	A432 in Fishponds, Bristol	A4017 near Kingswood, South Gloucestershire	Lodge Causeway
B4049 (defunct)	A430 (now A420) in Lawrence Hill, Bristol	B4047 in Fishponds	Much of route became part of the B4465 in 1935; route now split in two by the Lawrence Hill roundabout.
B4050 (defunct)	A38 at the Haymarket, Bristol	B4051 Lower Ashley Road, Bristol	Now part of the A4032.
B4051	A4018 at Park Street top, Bristol	M32 J3	Park Row, Marlborough St and Ashley Road
B4052	B4051 at Sussex Place, Bristol	A38 at Horfield, Bristol	Ashley Hill and Ashley Down Road
B4053	The Centre, Bristol	Temple Gate, Bristol	Baldwin Street, Bristol Bridge and Victoria Street Originally ran along Colston Street and Jamaica Street in Bristol. Renumbered as a western extension of the B4051 in 1935.
B4054	A38 at Gloucester Road, Bristol	A4 at Avonmouth	Cranbrook Road, Parry's Lane and Shirehampton Road
B4055	A4018 at Westbury-on-Trym, Bristol	New Passage	The route is in two parts separated by a mile of the A4018. One runs from Westbury-on-Trym through Henbury to the south end of Cribbs Causeway and the other from J17 of the M5 to New Passage.
B4056	A4018 at Durdham Down, Bristol	A38 at Filton	Henleaze Road and Southmead Road
B4057	B4054 at Kingsweston	A4018 at Brentry	Part One
B4057	A38 at Patchway	B4058 at Winterbourne, Gloucestershire	Part Two: the two parts are separated by Filton Airfield, and were connected before the runway was extended in 1949.
B4058	A432 at Eastville, Bristol	A46 at Nailsworth	
B4059	A432 at Yate	B4427 at Earthcott	Via Iron Acton; exists in two sections, connected by the B4058.
B4060	A432 at Yate	A4135 at Cam	Via Wotton-under-Edge
B4061	A38 at Alveston, Glos	A38 near Whitfield	Connects Thornbury with the A38
B4062	B4058 east of Charfield, Gloucestershire	B4060 at Kingswood, Stroud District	
B4063	A40 west of Cheltenham	Gloucester	Formerly part of the A40. Originally ran from Wotton-under-Edge to Symonds Hall. Renumbered as an eastern extension of the B4058 in 1935.
B4064	B4055 in Pilning	Severn Beach and New Passage	Has three arms at roundabout close to M4. Section to New Passage part of B4055 until 1930s. Originally ran from Wotton-under-Edge to Cam. Renumbered as a northern extension of the B4060 in 1935.
B4065	A38, north of Droitwich	B4090 in Droitwich town centre	Former route of A38. Originally ran near Dursley, cutting the corner between the B4064 and B4066 (later A4135). Renumbered as a portion of a new B4066 in the 1935 renumbering.
B4065	M6 Anstey Interchange (J2)	B4109 at Wolvey	Duplicate number. Former route of A46.
B4066	A419 at Dudbridge, Gloucestershire	Sharpness	Via Dursley and Berkeley, the section near Dursley is the original B4065. Originally ran between Tetbury and Cambridge. Upgraded to the A4135 around 1930.
B4067 (defunct)	A433/A434 in Tetbury	A433 in Tetbury	Declassified after the 1970s, likely in favor of the A433.
B4068	A436 west of Naunton, Gloucestershire	Stow-on-the-Wold	Originally a loop off the A38 in Berkeley. The northern section became a portion of the B4066 and the remainder a northern extension of the B4509. Only a mile of the ex-B4068 still exists as the B4066, while the remainder is now unclassified, probably due to narrow streets.
B4069	A3102 north of Lyneham	Chippenham, junction with A420	Formerly part of the A420. First used between Cirencester and Stroud. Due to its importance, it was upgraded to Class I status as the A4116 (now A419) in the mid-1920s. Next used from The Quarry to the A38. Renumbered as a western extension of the B4066 in 1935. Used a third time from Hinckley to Sapcote, despite the number being out-of-zone. Renumbered to the B4669 (still out-of-zone) in the 1990s (along with many other roads in Hinckley) when the A47 northern bypass was built.
B4070	A417 at Birdlip, Gloucestershire	Stroud	Originally ran from Stonehouse to Claypits. Due to its importance, it was upgraded to Class I status as the A4096 in the mid-1920s. Much of route now part of a rerouted A419; the western section is now unclassified as the A419 was routed away from Eastington to the M5.
B4071	A38 south of Whitminster, Gloucestershire	Saul, Gloucestershire	
B4072	Gloucester	A38 at Tuffley	
B4073	Gloucester	A46 at Painswick	
B4074 (defunct)	Barnwood	Longlevens	Elmbridge Road; cut the corner between the A419 (now A417) and A40 (now B4063). Later extended along the kink of Old Cheltenham Road when the A40 was rerouted. Now unclassified, likely due to completion of the A40 bypass.
B4075	A435 near Cheltenham Racecourse	A40, London Road, Cheltenham	Via Prestbury
B4076	A4114 in Allesley	Brownshill Green Road	Called Coundon Wedge Drive, it was built to serve the main gates of the now closed Jaguar Browns Lane site. Previously all traffic had to use Browns Lane to access the A4114/A45. Originally ran along Gloucester Road in Cheltenham, connecting Lansdown railway station to the A40 and A4019. Later renumbered as a counterclockwise extension of the B4075 and is now part of the B4633.
B4077	A46 & A435 at the Teddington Hands east of Tewkesbury	A429 in Stow-on-the-Wold	Via Teddington, Toddington, Stanway, Ford and Upper Swell
B4078	Winchcombe, Gloucestershire	A46 at Sedgeberrow	
B4079	B4080 at Bredon, Worcestershire	A46 at Aston Cross, Gloucestershire	Via Kinsham and Aston on Carrant
B4080	A4104 at Defford, Worcestershire	A38 at Tewkesbury, Gloucestershire	Via Eckington, Bredon's Norton, Bredon and Bredon's Hardwick
B4081	A44 west of Blockley, Gloucestershire	B4632 at Mickleton	Via Chipping Campden. A road of the same number previously ran from Wyken to Willenhall
B4082	A422 at Upton Snodsbury, Worcestershire	A44 at Pinvin, Worcestershire	Via Naunton Beauchamp
B4082	A428 at Binley	B4113 (old A444) at Little Heath	Duplicate number. Partly occupies original A4082 route.
B4083	A44 at Pinvin, Worcestershire	A4104 at Pershore, Worcestershire	Via Wyre Piddle
B4084	A4184 and B4035 at Evesham, Worcestershire	M5 at Whittington, Worcestershire	Previously the A44. There is also a spur named the B4084 between the new A44 at Egdon and the main B4084 near Windmill Hill
B4085	B439 at Bidford-on-Avon, Warwickshire	B4035 at Badsey, Worcestershire	Via Marlcliff, Cleeve Prior, The Littletons and Blackminster
B4086	A422 in Stratford-upon-Avon	B4100 near Warmington	Via Tiddington, Wellesbourne, Compton Verney, Kineton and Edge Hill
B4087	B4086 in Wellesbourne, Warwickshire	A422 and A445 in Leamington Spa, Warwickshire	Via Whitnash, Warwickshire
B4088	A422 and A441 west of Alcester, Warwickshire	A44 north of Evesham, Worcestershire	Via Weethley, Dunnington, Iron Cross, Norton and Harvington. Formerly continuation of A441. Originally ran from Kingsmead to Thelsford, cutting the corner between the B4086 and A429. Now unclassified, as the A429 does the job of the B4088.
B4089	A3400 at Wootton Wawen, Warwickshire	A435 and B4090 at Alcester, Warwickshire	Via Little Alne, Great Alne and Kinwarton
B4090	A38, south of Droitwich	A435, north of Alcester	Occupies former route of A38 in Droitwich. Via Feckenham and Woolmere Green.
B4091	A491, Stoneybridge Island	B4090 at Hanbury	Originally A449, then A491 between Stoneybridge and Stoke Heath.
B4092	A422 at Holberrow Green	A435, south of Studley	Via Astwood Bank and Studley
B4093	B4092 in Studley	Woodrow, Redditch	Originally continued into Redditch town centre.
B4094	A441	B4091	Short road in Stoke Heath, known as Worcester Road throughout its length. Originally ran in Redditch; its precise route has not been definitely established as the route never showed up on any maps, but it likely ran along Church Green East. Declassified early on and is now pedestrianized.
B4095 (defunct)	B4095 Studley Road, Redditch	A41/A46 in Warwick	Start point later moved to an interchange with the A441 and A448; formerly crossed River Arrow on now dismantled bridge west of the A435 junction (much of original route west of the A435 is now gone). Upgraded to the A4189; several road signs for the B4095 remain in Redditch.
B4096	B4184 in Redditch	A441 near Cofton Park	Originally northern terminus was on the A456 in Halesowen. This became the A459 and is now the B4451.
B4097 (defunct)	Banbury Road, Warwick	Smith Street, Warwick	St. Nicholas Church Street; shown on one map as an unnumbered A-road. Now part of the A429 one-way system.
B4098	A51 south of Kingsbury, Warwickshire	Coventry City Centre.	Entire route formerly classified A423 via Nether Whitacre, Furnace End, Over Whitacre, Fillongley, Corley and Coundon. Section from Kingsbury to B4114 (then the A47) later became an extension of the A51. After the A47 was downgraded, the section of A51 beyond Kingsbury was downgraded to the B4098 which ran as far as Coundon on the edge of Coventry. The remaining part of the former A423 was renumbered A4170 into Coventry until the 1980s when the B4098 was extended to Coventry City Centre. Originally ran along Priory Road in Warwick. Now part of the A445 one-way system.
B4099	A445 in western Leamington Spa	A425 in south-eastern Leamington Spa	

== B4100 to B4199 ==
Road	From	To	Notes
B4100	Bicester	M40 near Bishop's Tachbrook (and upon reprisal – A441 Digbeth).	Former alignment of A41 prior to the opening of M40. Starts in Bicester near the Bicester Village designer outlet and crosses the A43 near M40 J10. Continues via Baynards Green and Aynho then multiplexes with the A4260 from Adderbury for approximately 3.5 miles. It then regains its status from the Warwick Road, Banbury for less than 1/2 a mile as it becomes the A422 briefly. It then fully regains its status as the B4100, near Drayton where it continues for 14 miles passing M40 J12 & J13 at Gaydon and Warwick, respectively. The road is briefly reprised in Birmingham City Centre as a continuation of the A34 until it meets with the B4114 and A47 in Birmingham City Centre. Also used for the section of former A41 from junction with A4540 to A4400 Snow Hill Queensway.
B4101	Coventry City Centre	Redditch Town Centre	Passes through the villages of Balsall Common, Temple Balsall, Knowle, Dorridge, Hockley Heath, Wood End, Holt End and Beoley. Formerly part of the A4023.
B4102	Nuneaton Town Centre	B4101 near Earlswood, West Midlands	
B4103	A452 at Kenilworth	A452 near Kenilworth	
B4104	A452 at Kenilworth	B4103 at Kenilworth	
B4105	A41 Solihull Bypass	Birmingham Airport	Created in 2020, showing on maps that year. On the November 2019 revision OS VectorMap District map it is shown as unclassified. First used along Balsall Street in Balsall Common, connecting the A446 to the B4101. Became a portion of a rerouted A4023, but was downgraded back to the B4101 (not B4105, the B4101 having taken over the new route) in 1986 due to completion of the M42. Next used in 2015 along Broad Street in Coventry. May have been short-lived; little is known about this route. It is listed in a 2015 FoI request response from Coventry Council as well as on other 2011 documents, but it does not appear on a September 2016 revision of the OS VectorMap District map. The route is now unclassified.
B4106	A4114 at Allesley, Coventry	B4101 at Spon End, Coventry	
B4107	A429 at Earlsdon, Coventry	B4098 at Radford, Coventry	Originally ran from A45 Much Park Street to Spon Street in Coventry city center. Upgraded to Class I status by the early 1930s, becoming the A45 mainline (later A4114). Now unclassified.
B4108 (defunct)	B4106 Spon Street, Coventry	A423/A444 in Coventry	Declassified due to later redevelopment of Coventry. The section along King Street is now gone, lost under the A4053.
B4109	Coventry City Centre	Hinckley Town Centre	
B4110	B4109 at Hillfields, Coventry	A45/A46 at Willenhall, Coventry	
B4111	B4114 in Hartshill, Nuneaton	Atherstone	Originally B4115, then upgraded to A4135 before assuming current number. Via Mancetter. Originally ran from Binley (near Coventry) to North Kilworth, but was extended in the early 1930s to the southern extension of the A50 (formerly B568, now A5199) at Bosworth Lodge. Around 1935, the original route was upgraded to the A4114 (later A427); the extension hung on for a few more years as the B4111 before being renumbered to the B5414 as it was out-of-zone. The section between Coventry and the A5 was downgraded back to Class II status as the B4027, despite being a duplicate (this was corrected to B4428 in the 2000s). With the impending A14 in the 1990s the eastern section was renumbered to A4303 between the A5 and M1 and A4304 on the section to North Kilworth; both numbers are out-of-zone.
B4112	A426 in Rugby, Warwickshire	B4114 in Church End, Warwickshire	
B4113	A444 in Nuneaton	A452 near Leamington Spa	Originally ran from Bedworth to Bulkington. Now the B4029.
B4114	A34, Birmingham	A5460 at Fosse Shopping Park, Leicestershire	Has two branches in central Birmingham, both follow parts of the former Inner Ring Road. Broken by a section of A47 between A4540 Middleway and Saltley. Connects Birmingham to Coleshill. Except for section of former A4400, entire route formerly part of A47.
B4115	A45 in Finham, Coventry	A46/A429 near Warwick	Originally ran from Atherstone to Nuneaton. Upgraded to Class I status in the 1920s, becoming the A4131, but was downgraded back to Class II in the 1960s and is now the B4111.
B4116	B4098, B4114 at Over Whitacre, Warwickshire	B5006 near Measham, Leicestershire	
B4117	B4118 in Water Orton, Warwickshire	A446, near Coleshill, Warwickshire	
B4118	Castle Bromwich, West Midlands	A446, near Water Orton, Warwickshire	
B4119	B4118 in Castle Bromwich, West Midlands	B4114 in Castle Bromwich	Originally ran from Wishaw to Tamworth. Due to its importance, it was upgraded to Class I status as the A4091 in the early 1920s.
B4120	A38 in Longbridge, Birmingham	A441 near Alvechurch, Worcestershire	
B4121	A4123 at Quinton, Birmingham	A441 at Cotteridge, Birmingham	
B4122	A435 in King's Heath, Birmingham	A4040 in King's Heath	
B4123 (defunct)			This road ran from the A456 Hagley Road near Birmingham's boundary with Smethwick in Bearwood to a junction with the A441 near King's Norton running via Harborne. It was subsequently replaced by the A4123 south of Harborne and then later by an extended A4030 which also absorbed the A4123 beyond Harborne. During the 1960s, the route became part of the A4040.
B4124	A4540 in Ladywood, Birmingham	A4040 in Harborne, Birmingham	The middle section of the B4124 is now the A4540.
B4124	A41 in Hockley, Birmingham	A34 in Great Barr, Birmingham	
B4125	A456 in Edgbaston, Birmingham	A4030 in Smethwick, West Midlands	Crosses the former Harborne Branch Line, now a footpath.
B4126	A4040 in Winson Green	B4145 near Small Heath, Birmingham	Exists in two sections, connected by the A4540.
B4127	A38 Suffolk Street Queensway in Birmingham	A4540 Islington Row Middleway in Birmingham	Originally started on New Street in City Centre.
B4128	B4100, Digbeth	A4040 near Stechford, Birmingham	Extended to B4100 when A45 diverted onto Small Heath bypass. Originally ran along Suffolk Street in Birmingham. Upgraded to Class I status early on (the current number was in use by 1932), although due to its short length it is unknown what number it received. Later upgraded to a portion of the A4400 Queensway and is now the A38.
B4129	A457 in Cape Hill, Birmingham	A4040 in Harborne, Birmingham	Runs via Metchley Lane, former boundary between Staffordshire and Warwickshire. Originally ran along Navigation Street in Birmingham. Due to its short length, it is not known how long the B4129 number lasted; a map showed the route as Class I, but with no number (it was the A4166). Now unclassified after all traffic was routed out of the center of Birmingham.
B4130 (defunct)			Linked Bull Ring and Camp Hill in Birmingham as alternative to A41. Ran down Jamaica Row (no longer exists), Cheapside and Ravenhurst Street. Declassified (and partially gone) due to extensive redevelopment in the area.
B4131 (defunct)			Ran between Digbeth (then the A41) and B4132, Curzon Street via Meriden Street and New Canal Street. Now unclassified.
B4132	A41 in Birmingham	A38(M) at Aston	Originally started on Birmingham High Street which was then the A47. Ran down Curzon Street (where it met the B4131) and Lawley Street.
B4133	A4540 Dartmouth Middleway, Birmingham	A47 in Nechells, Birmingham	May not exist. Formerly started on Inner Ring Road.
B4134 (defunct)			Ran down Livery Street, Birmingham City Centre. Now unclassified.
B4135	A457 in Smethwick, West Midlands	A4400, Birmingham	Section between A4540 road and A4400 was originally A457.
B4136	A4092 in Smethwick, West Midlands	A41 in Handsworth, Birmingham	Originally ran along Waterloo Road but this was upgraded to the A4092 in 1924.
B4137	A4040 in Witton, Birmingham	A47 in Nechells, Birmingham	Prior to the creation of the A4040, continued to A41 in Handsworth.
B4138	A453 in Perry Barr, Birmingham	A4026 in Little Aston, Staffordshire	Originally continued along College Road to the current A34.
B4139	Six Ways Island, Erdington	A5127 in Erdington	Erdington High Street (original A38). Mostly one way. Due to pedestrianised northern part of High Street, diverted along New Street. Previously used for the section of A453 between Perry Barr and Sutton Coldfield.
B4140	A41 in Hockley, Birmingham	A4040 in Witton, Birmingham	
B4141	B4006 (original A419 in Swindon)	A361 in Swindon	Originally unclassified, it was part of the A345 during the 1970s. A road of the same number originally ran from Salford Circus, Birmingham to a junction with the A446 in Curdworth. When this was upgraded to A road, the B4141 was reused for the previously unclassified road between the A446 junction and A423 near Kingsbury. This was upgraded to A road status too when the A38 Sutton Coldfield bypass opened (although the original route along Old Kingsbury Road has been closed to traffic).
B4142	A5127 in Erdington, Birmingham	A453 in New Oscott, Birmingham	
B4143	A4311 in Swindon	B4006 in Swindon	Gypsy Lane, Swindon Originally ran in Birmingham from the A455 (now A34) New Town Row to the A41 Camp Hill. Upgraded to Class I status, with all except the southern end becoming the A45 by the mid-1940s. Now part of the A4540.
B4144	A41 in Hockley, Birmingham	B4132 in Nechells, Birmingham	
B4145	A41 in Sparkhill, Birmingham	B4114 in Saltley, Birmingham	
B4146	A41 in Tyseley, Birmingham	A435 in King's Heath, Birmingham	
B4147	A4040 in Stechford, Birmingham	B4114 in Hodge Hill, Birmingham	
B4148	A453 in Whitehouse Common, Sutton Coldfield	A38 in East Birmingham; A5127 in Erdington	Two branches south/west of Walmley
B4149	B4166 in Greets Green, West Midlands	A453 in New Oscott, Birmingham	
B4150	A420 Headington Hill	A40 Oxford Northern Bypass	Marston Road and Marsh Lane in Oxford. Originally ran from Queslett to Sutton Park. Upgraded to a portion of the A4041 in the 1970s.
B4151	A4148 in Walsall	A453 near Bassetts Pole, Warwickshire	Terminus is actually in Staffordshire
B4152	A454 in Aldridge, West Midlands	A452 in Brownhills, West Midlands	
B4153	A461	B4152	Coppice Road in Walsall Wood. Not signposted.
B4154	A4041 in Pheasey, West Midlands	B5013 in Hednesford, Staffordshire	
B4155	A452 in Brownhills, West Midlands	A5 near Brownhills, in Staffordshire	Prior to 1927, the road started at the junction of Broad Street and Stafford Street in Wolverhampton city centre. Some maps indicate the B4155 ends at the junction with the B5011 although some signs on the ground indicate it continues to the next roundabout where the B4155 (unsigned) turns left to end on the modern A5. The road ahead is now closed and gated but the B4155 originally continued along that road to a junction with the original A5.
B4156	A460 in Fallings Park, Wolverhampton	A34 in Great Wyrley, Staffordshire	Lanes split to form one way system in Cheslyn Hay.
B4157 (defunct)			Ran from New Road, Willenhall (original A454) to A462 in Ashmore Lake via Lower and Upper Lichfield Street. Later extended to Bilston Lane (A463, then A454, now B4484). Section through and north of Willenhall declassified in 1970s, southern section now B4484. Signs for B5147 (presumably a typo) at Bloxwich Road South junction with A462 in Lane Head, near New Invention were installed as recently as 2012 replacing accident damaged ones.
B4158	Chippenham, junction with A420	A350 north of Chippenham	This is known as Malmesbury Road in Chippenham. This was previously used for the following roads in Wolverhampton: Garrick Street, Market Street and Princess Street. After Dudley Street (the original route of the A459) was pedestrianized in the 1960s, these streets formed a rerouted A459 until all roads in the city centre were declassified in 1986 due to completion of the Inner Ring Road. Another B4158 appeared in Dudley on OS maps between the 1950s and 1970s. Perhaps due to the duplicate number, it was renumbered to B4588.
B4159 (defunct)			This was used for the northern half of School Street Wolverhampton until the southern section opened in the 1960s. Prior to then the A449 had run along Worcester Street and Victoria Street in the town centre. Upon the opening of the southern part of School Street, the roads exchanged designation with Victoria Street becoming the B4159 instead. In common with all roads in the city centre, Victoria Street was declassified in 1986 due to completion of the Inner Ring Road and work was carried out in 2022 and 2023 to pedestrianize the street.
B4160			Redditch Ring Road. One-way throughout its length. A road of the same number ran down Lower Stafford Street (between Cannock Road and Stafford Road) in Wolverhampton until the 1960s but is now part of the A449.
B4161	A4039 in Blakenhall, Wolverhampton	A41 near Tettenhall	via Compton and Penn
B4162	A41 in Bilston	A4039 in Bilston.	Previously also met A463 at A4039 junction prior to opening of Black Country Route (A463/A454). This was part of the London-Holyhead coaching route prior to the opening of Wellington Road as part of Thomas Telford's improvement work. This route number was briefly allocated to the current A4126.
B4163	A41 in Bilston	A461 in Dudley Port, Sandwell	via Coseley (Daisy Bank)
B4164	A40 in Whitchurch	Symonds Yat East	Originally ran from Moxley to Gospel Hill. Renumbered to the A4098 in 1924.
B4165 (defunct)			Connected West Bromwich and Walsall town centres. Now the A4031.
B4166	A461 near Great Bridge, West Midlands	A4034 near Oldbury, West Midlands	Originally ran between West Bromwich Street (former A4035), Great Bridge and A4034 in Oldbury town centre.
B4167	B4124 in Hamstead, Birmingham	A4041 in Great Barr, West Midlands	
B4168 (defunct)			Ran down Roebuck Lane and Galton Bridge between Smethwick and West Bromwich. Galton Bridge is now closed to traffic while Roebuck Lane was severed by the M5.
B4169	Smethwick Town Centre, West Midlands	A4034 in Blackheath, West Midlands	Divides into two branches, each joining A4034 north and south of Blackheath
B4170	A457 in Oldbury, West Midlands	B4169 in Langley Green, West Midlands	
B4171	A459 Dudley, West Midlands	Blackheath, West Midlands	Extended via former route of A461 Trindle Hill to meet A459 when bypass opened.
B4172	A461 in Brierley Hill	A4100 in Brierley Hill	Prior to 1925 continued to Cradley Heath along current route of A4100.
B4173	A459 in Netherton, West Midlands	A458 in Cradley	
B4174	A4100 in Quarry Bank, West Midlands	A458 in Cradley	
B4175	A449 in Wall Heath	A459 in Upper Gornal, Dudley	via Gornal Wood
B4176	B4177 in Dudley	A442 south of Telford	Forms part of one way system with B4177 in Dudley.
B4177	B4171 in Dudley	A459/A461 junction in Blowers Green, Dudley	King Street was part of A461 until Dudley Southern Bypass opened. Blowers Green Road part of A459 until bypass opened. Between 1922 and 1925, this was allocated to the current A4101 between the A461 and A449 (then A4040) junctions.
B4178	A449 in Wall Heath	A4101 west of Kingswinford Town Centre	Called Swindon Road along its entirety and runs for approximately half a mile
B4179	A4101 in Pensnett, West Midlands	A461 in Brierley Hill Town Centre	
B4180	A491 in Wordsley, West Midlands	A461 in Brierley Hill	Eastern section of Brockmoor High Street is one way, traffic redirected along Hickman Road
B4181	A4061 in Bridgend	Coychurch roundabout (A473)	Former routing of the A473. Originally used on a route connecting the A461 to the A449 (now A491) in Amblecote. Upgraded to Class I status, becoming the A4102 in 1925.
B4182	A456 in Bearwood, West Midlands	B4170 in Langley Green, West Midlands	
B4183	Halesowen Town Centre, West Midlands	A456 in Hayley Green, West Midlands	Formerly route of A456 until Halesowen by-pass opened.
B4184	A441 in Redditch	A448 in Bromsgrove Town Centre	Largely follows the former route of the A448. Originally ran along Chapel Street in Lye, cutting the corner between the A58 and A4036. Declassified after the 1960s.
B4185	B4091 (former A449) in Catshill, Worcestershire	A38 near Lydiate Ash, Worcestershire	
B4186	A458 in Wollaston, West Midlands	A4036 just south of Lye	Previously used for St John Street in Bromsgrove which is now part of the A448 and B4184.
B4187	A491 in Stourbridge	A456 in Hagley, Worcestershire	This originally ran from the A450 to the A456 along Park Road. When the A450 through West Hagley was downgraded, this became the B4187 too. The old route remains as a spur of the B4187.
B4188	A491 near Belbroughton, Worcestershire	A456 in Blakedown, Worcestershire	
B4189	A449 near Kidderminster, Worcestershire	A442 near Kidderminster, Worcestershire	Bridges the River Severn north of Kidderminster
B4190	B4189 near Kidderminster, Worcestershire	A456 near Bewdley, Worcestershire	Crosses the River Severn at Bewdley
B4191 (defunct)			Ran along Oxford Street and Worcester Street in Kidderminster. Mostly pedestrianised it was at one time part of the A451 one-way system.
B4192	A419 at Commonhead, near M4 on east edge of Swindon, Wiltshire	A4 in Hungerford, Berkshire	Formerly part of the A419 until the M4 was built. Previously used for the road from Bromsgrove to Kidderminster, now part of the A442.
B4193	A449 near Hartlebury, Worcestershire	A4025 at Stourport, Worcestershire	
B4194	B4196 at Areley Kings, Worcestershire	B4363 near Kinlet, Shropshire	Goes through Bewdley
B4195	B4190 at Bewdley, Worcestershire	A451 at Stourport, Worcestershire	
B4196	A451 at Areley Kings, Worcestershire	A443 at Holt Heath, Worcestershire	
B4197	A443 at Great Witley, Worcestershire	A44 at Knightwick, Worcestershire	Originally ran from Droitwich to Holt Heath. Upgraded to the A4133 in the late 1920s.
B4198 (defunct)	A38 Worcester Road, Droitwich	B4192 High Street, Droitwich	Ran along St Andrew's Road; now unclassified.
B4199	B4194 near Kinlet, Shropshire	B4363 near Kinlet, Shropshire	1 mile long

== B4200 to B4299 ==
Road	From	To	Notes
B4200	Wednesbury, West Midlands	A4038 near Darlaston, West Midlands	Previously continued to A462 in Darlaston Green. Originally (1922–1927) the route number for the A4117 in Shropshire
B4201	A4117 near Cleobury Mortimer, Shropshire	B4363 near Cleobury Mortimer, Shropshire	Passes Lakeside Country Park.
B4202	A443 at Abberley, Worcestershire	A4117 near Cleobury Mortimer, Shropshire	via Abberley and Bayton Common.
B4203	A443 at Great Witley, Worcestershire	A44 at Bromyard, Herefordshire	via Stanford-on-Teme and Upper Sapey
B4204	A443 at Worcester	A4112 at Tenbury Wells, Worcestershire	via Lower Broadheath (birthplace of Sir Edward Elgar)
B4205	A44 gyratory, Worcester	A44 London Road	This road runs through Worcester city centre. Passes Worcester Shrub Hill.
B4206	A443 at Worcester	A449 at Worcester	Malvern Road was the route of the A48 until the 1920s.
B4207 (defunct)			Now the B4312, it formed a bypass for the A40 through Carmarthen prior to the opening of the A40 bypass. A previous B4207 now forms the A4103 in Worcestershire.
B4208	B4213 at Staunton	A449 at Newland, Worcestershire	via Pendock and Barnard's Green
B4209	A449 at Malvern Wells	B4211 (former A440) at Hanley Castle	passes Three Counties Showground.
B4210	Walsall, West Midlands	A462 near Essington, Staffordshire	The section between Bloxwich and Walsall was originally the A34. They swapped numbers about 1987. Originally ran from Little Malvern to Upton-upon-Severn. Upgraded to the A4104 before 1930.
B4211	A449 at Malvern	A417 between Corse and Hartpury, Gloucestershire	The road originally ended on the A4104 but was later extended along the course of the A440 to Barnard's Green and later still along the remaining former A440 (which had become the A4532) to Malvern.
B4212 (defunct)	A38 at The Grove	A440 (now A4104) at Holly Grove	Declassified after the 1990s. Now just an access road.
B4213	A417 in Staunton	A38 near Highfield	Exists in two sections, connected by the B4211.
B4214	A438 at Ledbury, Herefordshire	A4117 at Cleehill, Shropshire	28 miles long. Originally continued along current route of A417 to A40 near Gloucester.
B4215	A449, Preston Cross Roundabout	A40, near Hynam	Originally started at Hope under Dinmore on A49 and followed course of current A417/A4172.
B4216	A438/A449 in Ledbury	A40 in Huntley	Concurrent with B4215 between Dymock and Newent
B4217	Five Ways, Birmingham	A4040 Fox Hollies Road at Acocks Green, Birmingham	Route of the number 1 bus. Via Edgbaston and Moseley. A road of the same number passed through Wyche Pass in Malvern but was upgraded to the A4105 in the 1920s. Part of it became the B4218 in the 1960s, the rest unclassified.
B4218	A449 in Malvern	A449, West of Malvern Hills	This road partly follows the earlier route of the B4217 but is diverted in the area of Fossil Bank. Via Colwall Green and Upper Colwall. Route was A4105 between the 1920s and 1960s. Originally ran from Bosbury to Stony Cross. Renumbered to a portion of the A4154 after World War II, but downgraded soon after to the B4220 (the B4218 number was already in use elsewhere).
B4219	A4103 at Storridge	B4232 in Malvern	Marked unsuitable for HGVs due to narrow width of road.
B4220	B4214 in Bosbury	A44, near Bromyard	via Pow Green, Westfield and Stony Cross. Section between A4103 and Bosbury briefly upgraded to A4154 (which continued to the A438, north of Ledbury).
B4221	B4215 at Newent	A40 at Ross-on-Wye	Includes link to T-junction with M50 at J3.
B4222	B4224, south of Lea	B4221 in Kilcot	via Aston Crews and Aston Ingham
B4223	A4058 at Llwynypia	A4061 near Treorchy	via Ton Pentre Originally ran from Monmouth to Huntley; was the lowest numbered Class II road in Wales. Due to its importance, it was upgraded to Class I status early on, becoming the A4136 in the late 1920s.
B4224	A438 at Hereford	A4136 at Mitcheldean	via Hampton Bishop, Mordiford and north Mitcheldean
B4225	A449 at Old Gore	B4224 at Old Gore	Very short road to be used to cut the Old Gore Crossroads and Give Way traffic.
B4226	A4151 at Cinderford	B4028 at Coleford	via Forest of Dean Originally ran from Cinderford to Elton. Renumbered as a portion of the A4151 in 1935.
B4227	B4226 at Cinderford	A4151 at Cinderford	Originally started on the current A48, which was numbered A437 at the time, in Blakeney and ended on the A40 in Ross-on-Wye town centre.
B4228	A48 near Chepstow	A4136 near Coleford	At one time, the southern terminus was at the Aust Ferry. Also ran to Ross-on-Wye.
B4229	A4137 at A40	B4234 near Goodrich	passes former Flanesford Priory
B4230	A438 near Byford	A4112 near Weobley	By way of Mansell Gamage, Norton Canon and Weobley Originally ran from Old Forge to Harewood End. Upgraded to Class I status as the A4137 in the late 1920s.
B4231	B4228 in Trow Green	former A48 in Lydney	via Bream. Originally started on A466 near Monmouth
B4232	A449 below Herefordshire Beacon	A449 near Link Top	Runs around the Western side of the Malvern Hills. Originally ran from Monmouth to King's Thorn. Renumbered as an extension of the A466 in the mid-1920s.
B4233	Abergavenny	Monmouth	By way of Llanvapley and Rockfield
B4234	A40/A449 near Ross-on-Wye	B4231 in Lydney	via Forest of Dean. Hill Street in Lydney was once part of the A48. (Still signed as such.) Originally ran from Raglan to Llanvihangel Gobion. Became a portion of a rerouted A40 in 1935 (old A40 became the B4251).
B4325	A472, east of Usk	A466 road, Chepstow bypass	Originally started in Usk town centre on A449 (originally A48). Replaced by A472 when bypass opened. Via Slough
B4236	A4042 near Llanrafon	B4237 (former A48)	via Caerleon. The section through Caerleon was originally the A48.
B4237	A48 at Newport	A48 at Newport (M4 J24)	Now part of the former A48 route through Newport. The previous route, including Newport Transporter Bridge is now unclassified.
B4238 (defunct)			Short road in Newport City centre: Emlyn Street (now Emlyn Walk) and Dock Street. Now largely pedestrianised.
B4239	B4487 in Rumney, Cardiff	A48 in Duffryn, Newport	via Peterstone Wentlooge. At one time it crossed the Newport Transporter Bridge before being replaced by the B4237.
B4240	B4237, Cardiff Road, Newport	B4591, Caerau Crescent in Newport	Stow Park Avenue
B4241 (defunct)	Harlequin Roundabout, A4042	B4591 (former A467) in Newport	Declassified in the 2000s.
B4242	A4109 at Aberdulais	Pontneddfechan	Mostly follows the former route of the Heads of the Valley Road (A465).
B4243 (defunct)	A467 in Bassaleg	A468 in Rogerstone	Renumbered to A4072 (now A467) in 1935.
B4243 (defunct)			Ran along Lleyncelyn Road, North Road and Porth Street in Porth; now part of the B4278 one-way system. The route is shown as an A-road in the early 1970s, so the number was probably assigned after the completion of the A4058 bypass. Although no maps have been found showing the B5243 number, it is possible that the number was briefly assigned before the renumbering to the B4278.
B4244 (defunct)	A472 in Pontypool	A4042 in Llantarnam	Upgraded to Class I status as the A4051 in the 1960s, but later road network improvements in Cwnbran led to the route being bypassed and was then declassified.
B4245	A48 at Llandevaud	A48 at Caldicot	via Llanmartin and Magor. A road of the same number previously ran from Little Mill, near Pontypool to Abergavenny. It was upgraded to A4125 and now forms part of the A4042.
B4246	A4043 at Abersychan	A465 at Govilon; A465 at Llanfoist	By way of Blaenavon
B4247	Rhossili	A4118 in Scurlage	via Pitton. Originally ran from Blaenavon to Govillion as the northern continuation of the A4043. Renumbered as a portion of a northern extension of the B4246 in 1935.
B4248	B4246 near Blaenavon	A467 at Brynmawr	via Llanelly Hill
B4249 (defunct)	Antwerp Place, Abertillery	Somerset Street, Abertillery	Declassified (along with the original route of the A467) when the A467 was rerouted.
B4250 (defunct)	Newbridge	Abercarn	Declassified due to rerouting of the A472 and A467.
B4251	A467 in Portllanfraith	A467 in Wattsville	The two spurs off the main route in Portllanfraith were originally the A472 and A4048, the latter being the original northern route of the B4251 before the Blackwood bypass opened.
B4252	A469 in Pengam	A472 south of Hengoed	via Fleur-de-lys
B4253 (defunct)	A4048 in Blackwood	A4049 in Pengam	Cefn Road, Twynyffald Road and Fair View; became part of B4254 and is now unclassified.
B4253 (defunct)	A4055	A4160	Exact line is contradicted by map makers but may have followed Barry Road
B4254	A4054 in Edwardsville	A4048, east of Blackwood	connects the Taf and Sirhowy valleys. Via Gelligaer
B4255	High Street, Bedlinog	A472 south of Nelson.	The two arms south of Nelson were historically the A472. Via Trelewis
B4256	A4048 in Tredegar	B4257 in Rhymney	a spur of the B4257 in Rhymney allows to access the southbound B4257
B4257	A469 in Pontlottyn	A465/A469 near Lechrydd	The Rhymney bypass partly occupies the former northern section of the road. Mostly follows the former route of the A469. Passes through Rhymney town centre.
B4258 (defunct)			The number was used for the gap in the A4055 between Grangetown and Llandough, which was a toll road, until 1935. The A4055 was then extended along the majority of the B4258 leaving just a short section between Canton and Llandaff which was later declassified. The A4055 later became the B4267. An earlier B4258 ran via Albany Road and is now part of the A469.
B4259 (defunct)			Ran from Butetown (A470) to A48 across the river from Cardiff Castle. Now the A4119, it ran via Grangetown.
B4260	A40 near Bridstow	A40 near Hildersley, Ross-on-Wye	Former route of A40 in Ross-on-Wye Originally ran from Llandough to Penarth; was not connected to the rest of the UK classified network until 1935, when it was renumbered to A4160.
B4261	A469 at Cardiff	A4161 at Cardiff	Road Name: City Road Originally ran from Llandaff to Llantrisant. Became the A4119 by the mid-1920s.
B4262	A4119 south of Radyr	A470 near Tongwynlais	Follows part of the course of the River Taff.
B4263	High Street in Senghenydd	A469 at Caerphilly Common	Passes Caerphilly Castle.
B4264	A4222 in Pontyclun	A4119 east of Miskin	via Miskin. Originally ran in Caerphilly from the B4263 in Penyrheol to the A468 (now B4600). Renumbered as a spur of the B4263 in 1935.
B4265	A4226 near Cardiff International Airport	A473 at Bridgend	via Llantwit Major. Originally started in Llantwit Major and ran to Cardiff International Airport and Barry.
B4266	A4226 at Weycock Cross	A4050 at Barry	Road name: Pontypridd Road.
B4267	A4119 at Canton	A4055 and A4231 at Ty Verlon Industrial Estate	via Llandough Originally ran from Llantwit Major to Cowbridge. Renumbered as a southern extension of the B4270 in 1935.
B4268	B4270 at Llandow	A48 at Pentre Meyrick	
B4269	A4042 at Llanellen	B4246 at Llanfoist	7.5 tonne weight limit throughout most of route. Originally ran from Bridgend to Llantwit Major. Renumbered as a western extension of the B4265 in 1935.
B4270	B4265 North of Llantwit Major	A4222 at Cowbridge	passes former RAF Llandow
B4271	A4118 near Upper Killay	B4295 at Llanrhidian	via Pengwern Common Originally ran from Ystrad Rhondda to Llantrisant. The section from Ystrad to Tonyrefail was upgraded to the A4093 in 1924, but a year or so later, the entire route was upgraded to the A4119. Much of route now unclassified or part of the B4278.
B4272 (defunct)			Now part of the B4595. Connected A473 and A4058 near Treforest.
B4273	north of Ynsybwl	A4223 in Pontypridd	Originally started in centre of Ynsybwl
B4274 (defunct)			Ran from junction with B4273 in Pontypridd to A470 in Pont Sion Norton. Bridge over River Taff now A4223, most of the remaining part replaced by A470 dual carriageway.
B4275	A4054 at Abercynon	A4059 at Penywaun	Originally the A4059 route. Via Mountain Ash.
B4276	B4275 (former A4059) at Trecynon	A465 north of Llydcoed	
B4277 (defunct)			Ran from Aberdare via Porth and Tonyrefail in the Cynon Valley. Most of route upgraded to A4233 in the 1980s
B4278	A4093 near Gilfach Goch	A4058 near Dinas	This road originally ran through Dinas and Tonypandy but was upgraded to the A4058 route.
B4278	A4058 near Porth	A4233 near Stanleytown; A4058 near Llwynypia	This road was originally the A4233 and A4058 but following the completion of the Porth Relief road these roads were downgraded.
B4279 (defunct)			There have been two roads with this number: a short lived B4279 ran between Bridgend and Swansea which was upgraded to the A4093 in 1924 and a B4279 in Wiltshire. This now unclassified route connected the A420 (now the B4069) at Langley Burrell to the A420 east of Sutton Benger.
B4280	A473 near Pencoed	A4061 at Bryncethin	via Hirwaun Common
B4281	A48 at Pyle, near Bridgend	A4063 near Aberkenfig	via Cefn Cribwr
B4282	A4017 at Cwmafan	A4063 at Cwmfelin	via Maesteg. A previous B4282 forms part of the current A4106 in Porthcawl.
B4283	A48 near Groes, Port Talbot	A4229 at South Cornelly	via Kenfig Burrows. Part of former route now the A4229
B4284	Five Ways, Birmingham	B4124 in Edgbaston, Birmingham	one way in an eastern direction only. Called Harborne Road. A previous B4284 was a dead end route starting at Cymer in South Wales but was upgraded to the A4107 and extended to Rhondda in 1925.
B4285	A4054 at Troed-y-rhiw	A4054 near Merthyr Tydfil	Passes close to site of Aberfan tragedy when 116 mostly children lost their lives. Old route passed through Aberfan village centre. First used between Cymer and Glyncorrwg. Upgraded to the A4108 in 1925, then renumbered as the northern end of the A4063 in 1935. Now unclassified. Next used from Crynant to Banwen as a continuation of the new A4109. Became a portion of an extended A4109 by 1932.
B4286	A4241 at Port Talbot	B4287 at Pontrhydyfen	Originally started at Port Talbot docks.
B4287	B4434 at Neath	A4107 at Pontrhydyfen	via Efail-fach
B4288 (defunct)	A48 in Neath	A465 (now A4109) in Aberdulais	It is not known how long this B4288 lasted, but it does not appear on any maps after the 1920s. Now part of the B4434.
B4288 (defunct)	A48 at St. Mellons	A468 at Bassaleg	Much of route now unclassified except a 700-yard section that is part of the B4562.
B4289	A3102 & A4289 in Swindon	A4361 in Swindon	Part of Swindon ring road. An earlier B4289 existed in Neath, was later upgraded as part of the A48 one-way system and is now partly numbered B4434.
B4290	B4489 at Swansea railway station	A4067 at Victoria Park	Originally one continuous route, the two sections of B4290 are separated by four miles of the A4067 road.
B4290	A483 near Jersey Marine	A4230 at Neath Abbey	
B4291	A48/A4230 near Peniel Green	B4603 at Clydach	via Glais and Birchgrove
B4292 (defunct)			Ran from St Thomas in Swansea to Llansamlet. Later upgraded to A4217, it was partly downgraded again during the 1970s but numbered B5444 despite being still in use for a road in Flint.
B4293	A466 in Monmouth	A466 in Chepstow	via Trellech and Chepstow Park Wood Originally ran along Oystermouth Road and Victoria Road near the Swansea seafront. Later became the start of the B4290 and is now part of the A4067.
B4294	A4055 in Barry	A4055 in Barry	The former route of the A4055 through Barry town centre Originally ran from Swansea to Port Eynon along the Gomer Peninsula. Upgraded to Class I status in the mid-1920s, becoming the A4118.
B4295	A4216 at Cockett	B4271 at Llanrhidian	north Gower road
B4296	A4118 at Killay	A48 at Pontarddulais	via Gowerton and Dunvant
B4297	A484 near Bynea	A40, south of Court Henry	via Dryslwyn, Gorslas, and Penygroes Originally ran from Ystalyfera to Sennybridge. Renumbered to the A4067 and A4068 in 1935; one section is now the B4599.
B4298	A40 west of Carmarthen	B4299 at Meidrim	Originally ran from Ystalyfera to Gurnos. Renumbered as a northern extension of the A4067 in 1935, but due to upgrades in the area much of the route is now the B4599.
B4299	A4066 at St Clears	B4333 south of Newcastle Emlyn	by way of Trelech Originally ran from Gurnos to Brynamman. Upgraded to Class I status in 1935, becoming the A4068.

== B4300 to B4399 ==
Road	From	To	Notes
B4300	A40 near Carmarthen	A476 West of Ffairfach	via Capel Dewi and Llanarthne
B4301	A484 at Bronwydd	A485 at Pontarsais	passes Gwili Steam Railway. Route of the A485 until 1935.
B4302	A483 near Llandeilo	A462 near Crugybar	Passes ruins of abbey in Talley
B4303	A476 near Felinfoel	B4297 near Penceiliogi	passes Prince Philip Hospital
B4304	A484/A4138 at Parc Trostre	A484 in Sandy, west Llanelli	
B4304	A484 in central Llanelli	B4304 at Morfa	Some maps omit this route.
B4304	Llanelli town centre	B4304 at Machynys	This branch is part of the original alignment of the B4304 which started on the then A48 and ran via Park Street (now pedestrianised) and Stepney Street.
B4305 (defunct)			Short link road between B4304 Station Road and A48 (later A484) Swansea Road. Partly replaced by the A4214.
B4306	A4138 in Hendy	B4309 near Bancycapel	via Llanon, Bryndu and Pontyberem Originally ran along Market Street in Llanelli; too short (only 100 yards) to appear on maps and may have never appeared on any maps at all as it was decommissioned by 1935. Th route was still Class II in the 1960s, but as a spur of the B4304. The original southern end is now gone, lost under Argos.
B4307 (defunct)			Ran down Vaughan Street in Llanelli; too short (one block long) to appear on maps. Unclassified by the 1960s and is now pedestrianized.
B4308	B4309 at Llanelli	A484 near Kidwelly	via Trimsaran. Former route of A484 in Kidwelly also part of B4308 (not signed).
B4309	A4124 in central Llanelli	A484 near Cwmffrwd	via Pontantwn. Previously terminated on A484 in Llanelli but extended to Church Street in Llanelli.
B4310	A476 in Tumble	B4437 at Llansawel	via Drefach, Porthyrryd, Nantgaredig. The spur in Porthyrryd was part of the A48. Passes National Botanical Gardens.
B4311	A484 at Pembrey	A484 by New Lodge	via Burry Port. Originally ran via Church Road in Burry Port but this is now unclassified.
B4312	Llansteffan High Street	A4242 north of Carmarthen	The two arms of the B4312 north of Carmarthen are the original route of the A40 before the bypass opened. The right hand arm passes an obelisk in memory of Lieutenant General Sir Thomas Picton who died at Waterloo.
B4313	A487 in Fishguard, Pembrokeshire	Narberth, Pembrokeshire	Starts at Main St, Fishguard (A487), winds generally S or SE finishing in Narberth (junction with B4314), via Gwaun Valley, Llanychaer, crosses B4329 at Greenway, Rosebush, Maenclochog, crosses A40; approximately 21 miles.
B4314	A4066 in Pendine	A40 at Robeston Wathen	via Red Roses and Princes Gate. A spur leads into Narberth Town centre ending on the A478.
B4315	A478 at Templeton	B4314 at Princes Gate	Originally started on A4075 at Cross Hands and ended at Templeton. This entire stretch is now the A4115.
B4316	A478 at Pentlepoir	A478 near Tenby	Serves Saundersfoot. The route through New Hedges was originally part of the A478.
B4317	A484 north of Pembrey	B4310 at Cwm mawr	via Carway and Pontyberem.
B4318	A477 on Sageston bypass	A478 in Tenby	Originally started in centre of Sageston village. Due to St John's Hill in Tenby being one-way, traffic heading the other way has to use Greenhill Road.
B4319	B4320 on Castlemartin Peninsula	A4319 in Pembroke	via Castlemartin, St Petrox and Kingsfold. When route past live firing range closed (near Castlemartin), diversion runs via Merrion.
B4320	Angle, Pembrokeshire	A4139, at Pembroke Castle	via Hundleton and Monkton, south Pembroke
B4321	Llangrannog, car park	A487 at Pentregat	Single track road for most of its length, barely a car width in places.
B4322	A4139, West Llanon, Pembroke	A4139, north of Pembroke	road names: Water Street, Bush Road, Pembroke Street, High Street, Bellevue Terrace in Pembroke Dock.
B4323 (defunct)			Short road in Pembroke Dock starting on Fort Road and continuing to then A477 (now A4189) via Laws Street and Bush Street. Bush Street now B4322, rest declassified.
B4324 (defunct)			Ran from A4076 in Johnson to Neyland where a ferry crossed the river to reach the A477. The B4324 subsequently was upgraded to form part of the A477. When the road bridge opened carrying the A477, the ferry ceased and the southernmost part became an extension of the B4325.
B4325	A4076 north of Milford Haven	A477 N of Neyland	via Waterston and Scoveston Fort. The section through Neyland from the Quay to the current A477 was originally the B4324 and was later upgraded to the A477 (which used a ferry to cross the river). When the road bridge opened, the former B4324 became part of the B4325.
B4326	A4076	A4076	Charles Street in Milford Haven. One way for most of its length.
B4327	A487 in Haverfordwest	Dale, west of Milford Haven	
B4328	A40, bypass north of Whitland	B4314 at Tavernspite	via Whitland.
B4329	A487 W of Eglwyswrw	A40 at Haverfordwest	Crosses Preseli Mountains N to S, reaching 404 metres (1,325 ft); scenic views across south and west Wales
B4330	A487 in Haverfordwest	A487 at Croes-goch	Joins W-bound A487 to NE-bound A487
B4331	A40 at Letterston	A487 at Mathry	part of the B4330 until 1935
B4332	A487 at Eglwyswrw, Pembrokeshire	A484 at Cenarth, Carmarthenshire	Via Newchapel (Manordeifi) and Boncath; crosses A478 near Blaenffos
B4333	A487 at Aberporth Airport	A484 at Cynwyl Elfed	Via Aberporth, Beulah, Cwm-cou (Carmarthenshire) and Newcastle Emlyn
B4334	B4321 in Llangrannog	A484 near Henllan	via Brynhoffnant and Pengallt
B4335	A484 at Pen-ffynon	A486 at Pentre-cwrt	follows course of River Teifi
B4336	A486 on Llandysul bypass	A485 in Llanllwni	previously met A486 near the old Teifi bridge. This became part of the B4624 with the B4336 running along a new road. Via Penlan.
B4337	A487 at Llanrhystud, Ceredigion	B4302 near Llansawel, Carmarthenshire	via Trelifan and Llansawel
B4338	B4337 at Llanbyder	A486 at the Synod Inn	Originally continued to New Quay where it met the B4339 head on and started at Synod Inn.
B4339	A482 in Ciliau Aeron	B4342 in Dihewyd	Originally ran from the then-B4338 in New Quay to the B4340 (now A482) in Ystrad Aeron. Became a western extension of the B4342 in 1935.
B4340	A4120 in Aberystwyth	B4343 at Pontrhyfdfendigaid	via New Cross and Abermagwr. A previous B4340 now forms part of the A482 between Aberaeron and Lampeter.
B4341	road junction at Galleon Inn in Broad Haven	B4327 in Albert Town	via Broadway
B4342	A486 in New Quay	A485 at Trefercel	via Ystrad Aeron and Stags Head
B4343	A44 below Bryn Glas	A482 at Cwmann	Multiplexes with A4120 between Tyn-y-fford and Devil's Bridge.
B4344	A483 at Llandovery	A40 at Llandovery	Stone Street, Llandovery
B4345 (defunct)			Mill Street in Aberystwyth. Now part of a rerouted A487. Also appears in the circa 2002 DfT Card Index as "Reserved for Gwndwn goyn - Parcllyn Road" This is generally assumed to be a route from Park Avenue to Parc Y Llyn in Aberystwyth, but for some reason never used.
B4346	A487, Trefachan Bridge in Aberystwyth	A487, North Parade in Aberystwyth	runs along sea front in Aberystwyth
B4347	Vowchurch in Herefordshire	B4233 in Rockfield	via Abbey Dore, Pontrilas, Kentchurch, Newcastle. Prior to 1922 only ran from Vowchurch to A465 at Pontrilas.
B4348	B4350 at Hay-on-Wye, Brecknockshire	A49 near Llandinabo, Herefordshire	via Dorstone, Peterchurch, Thruxton and Turkey Tump.
B4349	B4348 at Webton	A465 near Belmont Abbey	
B4350	A470 north of Llyswen	A438 west of Whitney-on-Wye	via Hay-on-Wye. The road through Hay-on-Wye was the A438 until the 1960s when it swapped route with the B4350 which used the current A438 route. This meant that traffic on the A438 avoided the Whitney Bridge which is a toll bridge with a weight limit.
B4351	A438 at Clyro	B4350 in Hay-on-Wye	
B4352	B4348, north-east of Hay-on-Wye	B4349 at Clehonger	via Pen-y-Park, Bredwardinen, Blakemere.
B4353	A487 at Rhydypeannau	A487 east of Llancynfellin	via Borth
B4354	A497 west of Llanystumdwy	A497 near Pwllheli	This almost dead straight road (along with the nearby current B4112) was built in 1800 during competition for carrying the mailcoaches between London and Dublin. In parts a very narrow road.
B4355	A483 at Dolfor	A44 Kington bypass	via Knucklas, Knighton, Presteigne. Follows English/Welsh border for 15 miles before entering Wales.
B4356	B4362 at Presteigne, Powys	A483 at Llanbister, Powys	The section of B4356 through Presteigne town centre is not signed and traffic is expected to use the parallel B4355 bypass instead.
B4357	A44 near Kington, Herefordshire	B4355 near Knighton, Powys	via Beggar's Bush
B4358	A483 at Beulah, Powys	A4081 near Llandrindod Wells, Powys	until 1995 ran through Beulah village and weight-restricted bridge.
B4359	A49, Edgar Street in Hereford	A438, New Market Street in Hereford	via Widemarsh Street. Former route of A49. A road of the same number now forms parts of the A4113, B4362 and B4355 in Radnorshire.
B4360	B4529 (former A44), west of Leominster, Herefordshire	A4110 in Kingland, Herefordshire	via Cobnash
B4361	A49 at Ludlow, Shropshire	A49 at Leominster, Herefordshire	
B4362	A49/A456 at Brimfield, Herefordshire	A44 near Kington, Herefordshire	
B4363	A454 at Bridgnorth, Shropshire	A4117 at Cleobury Mortimer, Shropshire	Section between A454 and Bridgnorth town centre is the original route of the A454 before the bypass opened.
B4364	Bridgnorth, Shropshire	A4117 near Ludlow, Shropshire	
B4365	A49 at Ludlow, Shropshire	B4368 at Corfton, Shropshire	Crosses over the tracks of Ludlow Racecourse – traffic is stopped when course is in use
B4366	A4086 at Caernarfon	A4244 / B4547	
B4367	B4368 near Craven Arms, Shropshire	A4113 at Bucknell, Shropshire	
B4368	A458 near Bridgnorth, Shropshire	A483 at Abermule, Powys	Crosses A49 (at Craven Arms), A488 and A489
B4369	B4367 at Broome, Shropshire	B4368 at Aston on Clun, Shropshire	0.5 miles long
B4370	A49 at Marshbrook, Shropshire	A489 at Horderley, Shropshire	The northern section from Little Stretton to All Stretton was renumbered to B5477 in 2004
B4371	A458 at Much Wenlock, Shropshire	B5477 in Church Stretton town centre, Shropshire	Intersects with the A49 at Church Stretton
B4372	A44 at New Radnor, Powys	B4357	
B4373	B5060 at Donnington, Telford, Shropshire	Bridgnorth, Shropshire	Goes through Ironbridge Gorge
B4374 (defunct)	B4373 Northgate, Bridgnorth	A458 Salop Street, Bridgnorth	Now part of the B4364 and mostly one-way eastbound.
B4375	B4373 at Broseley, Shropshire	B4376 near Much Wenlock, Shropshire	
B4376	B4373 at Broseley, Shropshire	A458 at Much Wenlock, Shropshire	
B4377 (defunct)	B4380 in Ironbridge, Telford	B4373 in Broseley	Renumbered as an extension of the B4373 in 1935. The northernmost section at the Iron Bridge is now unclassified.
B4378	A458 at Much Wenlock, Shropshire	B4368 at Shipton, Shropshire	
B4379	A442 and B4176 at Sutton Maddock, Shropshire	A41 at Woodcote Hill, Shropshire	
B4380	A4169 near Ironbridge, Shropshire	A5 at Montford Bridge, Shropshire	Passes through the south and west of Shrewsbury
B4381	A490/A458 at Welshpool, Powys	B4388 near Welshpool	
B4382	B4389 near Llanfair Caereinion, Powys	B4393 near Lake Vyrnwy, Powys	Crosses A495
B4383	A488 near Bishop's Castle, Shropshire	A489 near Bishop's Castle, Shropshire	1 mile long
B4384	A488 at Bishop's Castle, Shropshire	B4385 at Bishop's Castle, Shropshire	Schoolhouse Lane; less than 0.5 miles long
B4385	A4113 at Leintwardine, Shropshire	A458 near Llanfair Caereinion	Passes through Montgomery, Powys; crosses A488, A489 and A483
B4386	A458/A488 at Shrewsbury	A483 at Abermule, Powys	26 miles long; crosses A5 and A490
B4387	A488 at Minsterley, Shropshire	A458 at Halfway House, Shropshire	
B4388	Montgomery, Powys	A458 near Welshpool, Powys	Crosses A490
B4389	A495 near Llanfair Caereinion, Powys	A483 near Newtown, Powys	Crosses A458
B4390	A483 at Berriew, Powys	B4389	
B4391	A490 near Llanfyllin, Powys	A494 at Bala, Gwynedd	Part of former route lies under the nearby reservoir.
B4392	A483 at Arddleen, Powys	A458 at Cyfronydd, Powys	Crosses A490
B4393	A458 at Ford, Shropshire	Lake Vyrnwy	Crosses A483 and A495; encircles Lake Vyrnwy
B4394	A442 at Wellington, Shropshire	B4380 at Wroxeter	Crosses A5
B4395	A458 at Llangadfan, Powys	B4393 near Lake Vyrnwy	
B4396	A5 at Nesscliffe, Shropshire	B4393 near Lake Vyrnwy	Crosses A483 and A495
B4397	B4396 at Knockin, Shropshire	B5063 near Wem, Shropshire	
B4398	B4396 at Knockin, Shropshire	B4393 Llansantffraid, Powys	
B4399	Holme Lacy Bridge	A49 Ross Road	Alternative way to Hereford from the M50

== B4400 to B4499 ==
Road	From	To	Notes
B4400 (defunct)	A483 Cross Street and A4083 Leg Street, Oswestry	A483 Beatrice Street, Oswestry	Oswald Road; now part of the B5069 one-way system.
B4401	A5 at Corwen, Denbighshire	A494 near Bala, Gwynedd	
B4402	A494	B4391	
B4403	A494 at Llanuwchllyn, Gwynedd	B4391 near Bala, Gwynedd	Runs along the eastern side of Llyn Tegid (Bala Lake)
B4404	A489 at Cemmaes Road, Powys	A487 near Machynlleth, Powys	
B4405	A487 at Minffordd, Gwynedd	A493 near Tywyn, Gwynedd	
B4406	B4407 south west of Llyn Conwy, Gwynedd	A5 south east of Betws-y-Coed, Gwynedd	by way of Penmachno
B4407	B4391 near Ffestiniog, Gwynedd	A5 near Pentrefoelas, Gwynedd	by way of Ysbyty Ifan Originally ran from Llan Ffestiniog to Conwy via Betws-y-Coed. By 1932, the southernmost section had become a portion of a rerouted B4408 to Congl-y-Wal and the A496 from there to Blaenau Ffestiniog. By 1939, the B4408 was decommissioned, with the A496 extended over it further to Betws-y-Coed and the section from there to Conwy renumbered to the B5106. Sections became the A4108 and A5110 by 1956, but the ex-B4408 is now the A470 from Llan Ffestiniog to Betws-y-Coed and B5106 north of there; the section just south of the A5 is now unclassified.
B4408 (defunct)			First used from the B4391 at Pont Tal-y-bont via Tanygrisiau to the B4407 at Rhiwbryfdir. By the end of the 1920s, the southern half was a northern extension of the A496 and the northern section declassified (this section became the B4414 in 1935 when it returned to Class II status). The B4408 was then rerouted south of Blaenau Ffestiniog along the-then B4407 to the A487 near Gellilydan. This B4408 was renumbered to A4108 (now A470) before 1956.
B4409	A5 at Bethesda	A4244 at Glasinfryn	Originally connected linked the B4407 and B4408 south of Blaenau Ffestiniog. Renumbered as a northern extension of the A496 in the mid-1920s and is now unclassified after the A496 was rerouted.
B4410	A498 north of Prenteg	A487 near Maentwrog	Sarn Helen – crosses A4085 at Garreg
B4411	A487 at Glan-Dwyfach, Gwynedd	A497 at Criccieth, Gwynedd	
B4412	A497 at Bryncynan Inn	unclassified road at Morfa Nefyn	Originally began at Pwllheli; this is now part of the A497.
B4413	A499 at Llanbedrog, Gwynedd	Aberdaron, Gwynedd	
B4414 (defunct)	B4413 in Llanbedrog	Abersoch	Renumbered as a western extension of the A499 in 1935.
B4414 (defunct)	A496 in Rhiwbryfdir	A496 in Pengwarn	Initially a portion of the B4408 but quickly declassified. Received the B4414 number when the route returned to Class II status in 1935. Much of route now part of the A496, except the northmost third which was bypassed and is now unclassified.
B4415	B4413 in Nanhoron	A497 in Efailnewydd	
B4416	A470 near Dolgellau, Gwynedd	A494 near Dolgellau, Gwynedd	Originally ran from Nefyn to the B4412, connecting Nefyn to the rest of the road network. Absorbed into the western extension of the A497 in 1935.
B4417	B4413 in Pen-y-groeslon	A499 in Llanaelhaearn	via Nefyn
B4418	A487 near Pen-y-Groes and Llanllyfni, Gwynedd	A4085 at Rhyd-Ddu, Gwynedd	by way of Nantlle
B4419	A5 in Pentre Berw	A487 in Caernarfon	Exists in two sections; originally connected by a ferry across the Menai Strait, but the ferry was discontinued in 1954.
B4420 (defunct)	B5108 (later A5025) in Four Crosses, Menai Bridge	B4422 in Bethel	Originally ended at the B4421 in Newborough, but was quickly extended to Bethel. Much of route became the new A4080 in 1935; the portion into Bethel became the B4422 because the A4080 did not go into Bethel and the northern section became the B5420 (now A5025) because the A4080 did not cross the A5 (the old number would have been out-of-zone north of the A5).
B4421	A4080 in Newborough	B4419 in Llangaffo	
B4422	A4080 south of Bethel	B5109 in Llangefni	Originally began at the B4423 in Llanfaelog, but this was bypassed by the A4080 in 1935 and the route was cut back to Bethel. Originally ended at the A5 near Llangristiolus, but was extended to Llangefni in the 1960s.
B4423 (defunct)	B4422 in Llanfaelog	B5112 in Trefor	The section south of the A5 was upgraded to a portion of the A4080 and the northern third became a portion of a rerouted B5112 in 1935.
B4423 (defunct)	A465 in Llanvihangel Crucorney	unclassified road in Llanthony	Declassified in the 1970s.
B4424	A40 near Burford	A429 east of Cirencester	Formerly part of the A433 Originally ran along Queen Street in Carmarthen. Likely classified at the last minute (probably early 1923), as the other B442x roads are on Anglesey. Despite surviving the 1935 renumberings, the route is now unclassified and one-way eastbound.
B4425	A40 near Burford	A429 east of Cirencester	Formerly part of the A433
B4426 (defunct)	A431 in Bitton	A430 in Bridgeyate	Became an extension of the B4427 in 1935 and has been upgraded to a portion of the A4175.
B4426 (defunct)	A419 Chesteron Lane, Cirencester	A417/A429 in Cirencester	Not shown on maps until the 1940s; the central portion was wiped out by the modern A429 Bristol Road and the remainder is now unclassified.
B4427	B4058 at Hambrook, South Gloucestershire	A38 at Rudgeway	Old Gloucester Road
B4428	B4082 at Binley, Coventry	A5 at Cross in Hand	Previously numbered B4111, A4114, A427, B4027. Numbered B4428 in 2000s. First used from Berkeley to Sharpness. In the 1935 renumbering, it was recommended that the route be extended to the A4135, but this never happened; the B4066 was extended west to Sharpness and the B4428 was declassified instead. Next used from the A429 Fosse Way west of Chesterton to Kemble Airfield (now Cotswold Airport). Became a portion of a rerouted A429 in the 1960s.
B4429	A428 at Rugby	M45/A45 at Thurlaston	
B4430 (defunct)	B4456 (now A4148) Wallows Lane, Walsall	A461 (now unclassified) Wednesbury Road, Walsall	Declassified; the junction with Wallows Lane at its southern end has closed to vehicular traffic.
B4431 (defunct)	B4432 in Coleford	A48 in Wenchford	Much of route now unclassified except for the extension from Coleford to the Robin Hood junction which is part of the B4428.
B4432	A4136 at Five Acres	B4226 at Broadwell	Originally began at Symonds Yat Rock; this section is now unclassified. Originally ran from Marian's Inclosure to Tutshill. By 1932 the first section into Coleford became an extension of the B4431 while the remainder was renumbered to B4228. Later renumberings rerouted the B4228 to take over the section north of Coleford.
B4433	A4067/B4593 in Oystermouth	unclassified road at Mumbles Pier	Originally ran from North Cornelly to Cwrt-y-Defaid. Became a spur of the B4283 in the 1935 renumbering and is now part of the B4283 mainline.
B4434	A474 in Neath	A465 at Resolven	
B4435 (defunct)	A474 Herbert Street, Pontardawe	A4067 (now B4603) Brecon Road, Pontardawe	Declassified due to rerouting of the A474.
B4436	A4118 near Langrove	A4067 at Blackpill	
B4437	A44 near Wootton, Oxfordshire	A361 north of Burford	via Charlbury
B4438	A452 in Bickenhill, West Midlands	B4102 at Catherine-de-Barnes, West Midlands	Passes through Birmingham Airport. Section between A45 and just south of Bickenhill replaced by A4545 which opened in December 2024.
B4439	A3400 in Hockley Heath, Warwickshire	A4177 near Hatton	Until full opening of M40, connected A34 to A41.
B4440	A40 at Hotspur	A4094 at Wooburn Green	In the 1935 renumbering, it was proposed that the route be renumbered as an extension of the B476. While this was approved by the MoT, this change never happened.
B4441	A4154 at Sycamore Corner, Amersham	A416 at Oakfield Corner, Amersham	Sycamore Road, Amersham
B4442	A404 at Little Chalfont	A413 at Chalfont St Giles	
B4443	A413 in Aylesbury	A4010 in Stoke Mandeville	Originally continued further to the A418 northeast of Aylesbury town center; this section is now unclassified.
B4444	A4129 in Longwick	A4010 in Princes Risborough	
B4445	A418 at Thame	B4009 at Chinnor	
B4446	A4 in Sonning	B478 in Sonning	
B4447	A4 in Maidenhead	A4094 in Cookham	
~~B4448~~	unused		
B4449	B4044 at Eynsham, Oxfordshire	A4095 at Bampton	
B4450	Chipping Norton, Oxfordshire	A436 east of Stow-on-the-Wold	via Bledington
B4451	B4100 at Gaydon, Warwickshire	A425 at Southam, Warwickshire	
B4452	A425 at Ufton Cross Roads (east of Ufton)	B4451 at Deppers Bridge	
B4453	A445 in Leamington Spa, Warwickshire	A45 at Dunstore Heath near Rugby, Warwickshire	
B4454 (defunct)	B4106 Spon End, Coventry	B4107 (later A4114) Queen Victoria Street, Coventry	In the 1960s, the eastern half was wiped out by the A4053; the western half is now the B4101. The route was occasionally labeled as B4464 (a typo), but the origin of this error is uncertain. Number also appears in Wednesfield on online maps before 2009, but this is a typo for the B4484. March End Road is now part of the U99 and Alfred Square Road is possibly unclassified.
B4455	A429 near Halford, Warwickshire	A5 at High Cross, Leicestershire	Part of the Fosse Way (Roman road) Originally ran from Wolvey Heath to Cross in Hand. Declassified in the mid-1970s due to completion of the M69. The ex-B4455 crosses the current B4455 at Cloudesley Bush.
B4456 (defunct)	A461 in Pleck, Walsall	A461 northeast of Walsall town center	Walsall Ring Road; loop completed by the mid-1940s. The southwest corner was always part of the A461 mainline while the northwest corner never existed as part of the B4456. Now upgraded to the A4148.
B4456 (defunct)			Provisional number for the former A49 through Ludlow after it was rerouted onto the eastern bypass. Number never used; the B4361 was extended over the route instead.
B4457	A4110 at Stretford Bridge	A44/A4412 at Golden Cross	Originally continued to the original A44 at Upper Hardwick as the A44 did not exist at this location; this is now part of the A44.
B4458	A48 (now B4293) Monnow Street, Monmouth	A446 in Monmouth	Declassified.
B4458			Typo for the B4588.
B4459	A485 south of Pencader	B4338 in Talgarreg	Original route to Rhos Ymryson declassified since the 1970s. Originally ran from Bow Street to Capel Dewi. Upgraded to Class I status in 1935, becoming the A4159.
B4460 (defunct)	Craven Park Road, Harlesden	High Street, Harlesden	Manor Park Road, Harlesden; now the northwest–southeast carriageway of the A404 gyratory.
B4461	M48 at Aust	B4061 at Alveston	
B4462 (defunct)	A429 in Barford	A41 at The Asps (south of Warwick)	Declassified in 1991 after the Waterstock-Longbridge section of the M40 opened.
B4463	A46 at Sherbourne	A4189 west of Hampton on the Hill	
B4464	A454, near Willenhall, West Midlands	A454/M6 junction, Bentley, West Midlands	Former route of A454 through Willenhall Town Centre. Extended through Bentley to M6 J10 when A454 rerouted along Black Country Route. Originally ran along Sutton Road in Kidderminster. Now part of the A4535.
B4465	A420 at Easton, Bristol	A46 near Tormarton	Passes through Chester Park, Staple Hill and Pucklechurch, ending near Junction 18 of the M4. Prior to c1962, continued east from Pucklechurch, through Hinton, to A46 at Burton.
B4466	A4 (Hotwells Road), Bristol	A4018 at Clifton, Bristol	Jacob's Wells Road
B4467	B3129 in Clifton, Bristol	A4176 at Clifton Down	Pembroke Road
B4468	A4018 at Durdham Down, Bristol	A38 at Horfield, Bristol	Coldharbour Road and Kellaway Avenue
B4469	A38 at Horfield, Bristol	A420 at St George, Bristol	Muller Road and Rose Green Road
B4470 (defunct)	A487 at Trawsfynydd	B4493 at Bryn Maenllifo	Reserved in 1964; renumbered to A4212 in 1968.
B4471	A472 at Hafodyrynys	A4046 at Aberbeeg	
B4472 (defunct)	A472 at Cwm-dows, Newbridge	A472 in Crumlin	Declassified.
B4473	A458 west of Shrewsbury	B4380 at Montford Bridge, Shropshire	1 mile long; crosses A5
B4474 (defunct)	James Street, Portardawe	High Street, Portardawe	Later rerouted along Dynevor Terrace (this became a stub of the A474). Both routes now unclassified.
B4475 (defunct)	A483 Garth Road, Builth Wells	Wye Bridge, Builth Wells	Now part of the A483 one-way system.
B4476	B4624 in Llandysul	A475 at Pren-gwyn	
B4477	A361 at Broughton Poggs	B4047 at Minster Lovell	Originally ran from New Tredegar to Rhymney. Declassified by 1961 due to numerous landslides.
B4478	A4046/A4281 in Willowtown	A4046 in Briery Hill	
B4479	A44 in Bourton on the Hill	B4035 in Charingworth	
B4480 (defunct)	A34 (now A3400) north of Wootton Wawen	A435 at Ullenhall	Declassified around 1990.
B4481 (defunct)	A423 in Willenhall	A46 near Walsgrave	Section north of Binley is now part of the B4082 while the remainder is unclassified.
B4482	B4550 in Brickfields, Worcester	A38 in Perdiswell	Former portion of the A4536.
B4483	B4163 in Coseley, West Midlands	A457 in Woodsetton, West Midlands	Not signposted off A457.
B4484	A460 in Fallings Park, Wolverhampton	Bilston Town Centre	Rerouted in Willenhall when town centre pedestrianised. Extended into Bilston along former A463 route when Black Country Route opened.
B4485	A44 at Worcester	A4440 at Worcester	Originally ran along Wylds Lane in Worcester; the eastern half may have been part of an extended B4205 before the entire route received the B4485 number. One old map shows the route as B4085, despite that number existing on a route near Eversham since 1922. Whatever the result, the route was short-lived; the western half is now unclassified and the eastern half part of the B4205.
B4486	A4281 in Pont-y-gof	A4046 in Waun Lwyd	
B4487	A4161 in Roath	A48 in St Mellons	Exists in two sections, separated by a 1.3 km (0.81 mi) gap.
B4488	A48 at Waun-gron Park	B4267/A4119 at Llandaff Fields	
B4489	A483 at Swansea	A48 and the M4 at J46	
B4490 (defunct)	A4048 Gladstone Street, Crosskeys	A467 (now B4591) St Mary Street, Risca	Declassified.
B4491	North Circular Road at Gunnersbury	B452 at Northfields, near Northfields Underground station	Passes Gunnersbury Park. Road Names: Popes Lane, Little Ealing Lane.
B4492	A4000 at Gypsy Corner, North Acton just north of the A40, Western Avenue	A4000 at Harlesden, just south of the A404	"Alternative" route through Park Royal via North Middlesex Hospital. Road Names: Park Royal Road, Acton Lane.
B4493	A34 at Chilton, Oxfordshire	A4130 at Didcot, Oxfordshire	Road originally ran through Harwell, Oxfordshire and terminated on the A417 but was extended to Chilton in 2016 to meet a new junction with the A34 and A4185.
B4494	A4 at Newbury	Wantage	
B4495	A4144 Abingdon Road, Oxford	A4165 Banbury Road, Summertown, Oxford	Passes through the east of Oxford, over Donnington Bridge, through Cowley and Headington, then Marston Ferry Road
B4496 (defunct)	A420 Park End Street, Oxford	A4144 St Giles, Oxford	Now part of the A4144 (old A4144 is now pedestrianized).
B4497	B4101 in Beoley	A435 in Washford	
B4498 (defunct)	A41 (now B4100) Old Snow Hill, Birmingham	A34/B4144 in Lozells	Declassified in the 2010s.
B4499	A488 at Minsterley, Shropshire	B4386 at Brockton, Shropshire	

== B4500 to B4599 ==
Road	From	To	Notes
B4500	B5070 at Chirk, Wrexham	B4580 at Llanrhaeadr, Powys	Also allocated to the bypassed section of the A4071 in Rugby. Signs were erected showing the B4500, but when Warwickshire County Council realized that the number was a duplicate, a new sign was erected showing the B4642 number. Soon after this, all signs were patched over to show B4642.
B4501	A543 at Denbigh, Denbighshire	A4214 at Fron-Goch, Gwynedd	passes Llyn Brenig, Alwen Reservoir and crosses A5 at Cerrigydrudion
~~B4502~~	unused		
B4503	A449 at North Malvern	A4103 in Leigh Sinton	
B4504	A441/A448 in Crabbs Cross	A448 at Pitcher Oak Wood	Originally ran from Rickmansworth to Watford. Upgraded to Class I status in the 1970s, becoming the A4145.
B4505	A4251 at Hemel Hempstead	A416 at Newtown, Chesham	
B4506	A4251 in Northchurch	B489 at Whipsnade	
B4507	Wantage	B4000 at Ashbury	Formerly continued east via Bishopstone and Wanborough to meet the A419 east of Swindon; this section is now unclassified.
B4508	A420 west of Kingston Bagpuize	B4000 east of Sevenhampton	
B4509	B4060 at Wickwar	A38 at Falfield	
B4510	B4035 at Bengeworth	B4085 at North Littleton	
B4511	A4049 at Aberbargoed	A4048 at Bedwellty	
B4512	A4058 at Ystrad	A4233 near Tylorstown	
B4513 (defunct)	A4100 Randal Hill Road, Old Hill	A459 Halesowen Road, Old Hill	Declassified when the A459 was realigned to bypass Old Hill.
B4514	B4217 in Acock's Green, Birmingham	A41 in Olton, Birmingham	
B4515	A41/B4100 at Gib Heath	A34 and B4144 at Lozells	
B4516	B4145 in Saltley, Birmingham	B4114 in Washwood Heath, Birmingham	
B4517	A4037 in Tipton, West Midlands	A461 in Great Bridge, West Midlands	Road diverted through new tunnel under railway in Tipton replacing level crossing on West Coast Main Line.
B4518	A470 at Rhayader, Powys	Llanbrynmair	
B4519	A483 at Garth, Powys	B4520 north of Upper Chapel, Powys	runs beside MoD's artillery range on Mynydd Epynt
B4520	A483 at Builth Wells, Powys	B4601 at Brecon, Powys	
B4521	A49 five miles west of Ross-on-Wye, Herefordshire	A40 at Abergavenny, Monmouthshire	Road is approximately 20 miles long, heading in a south westerly direction from Herefordshire into South Wales. Near its western end it forms a part of the border of the Brecon Beacons National Park.
B4522	A4061 at Treherbert, Rhondda Cynon Taf	Blaencwm, Rhondda Cynon Taf	Road lasts approximately 3/4 of a mile. Although on OS maps it is not displayed as the B4522, it is signposted as the B4522 on the A4061 in the local vicinity. Maps show it as Dunraven/Gwendoline Street, Treherbert.
B4523 (defunct)	A4119 Dunraven Street, Tonypandy	A4058 Miskin Road, Tonypandy	Bridge over the Rhondda gone due to the present A4058; the eastern end is now the B4278 and the remainder unclassified.
B4524	A48 near Corntown, Vale of Glamorgan	B4265 at Ewenny, Vale of Glamorgan	
B4525	A422 at Middleton Cheney, Banbury	A43 near Syresham, Brackley	Road begins 1 mile east of the M40 J11 and is classified as a country route which connects to the A43, whilst bypassing Brackley. This road has been greatly truncated at its eastern end. Formerly, it ran to Northampton by way of Thorpe Mandeville, Moreton Pinkney, Adstone, Litchborough and Bugbrooke this route has been declassified.
B4526	Goring, Oxfordshire	A4074 near Woodcote, Oxfordshire	
B4527 (defunct)	B4006 Victoria Road, Swindon	A361 (now B4289) Drove Road, Swindon	Declassified in the 2000s. The number was still included in the 2005 DfT road lists, but it had been declassified by then.
B4528	A420 in Chippenham	B4158 Malmesbury Road in Chippenham	Road is 1/2 a mile long. Originally ran from Brimfieldcross into Brimfield itself. Upgraded to Class I status, becoming the A4105 in 1971, but has been declassified again due to completion of the A49 Brimfield bypass.
B4529	A4110 near Leominster, Herefordshire	B4360 near Leominster	Originally ran from Shirl Heath to Lawton Cross. Declassified in the 1980s when the road it met at its southern end (the A44) was also declassified.
B4530	A4113 at Walford, Herefordshire	A4110 at Adforton, Herefordshire	
B4531	A4040 in Erdington, Birmingham	A5127 in Erdington	
B4532	A456 in Edgbaston, Birmingham	B4217 in Edgbaston	
B4533 (defunct)	B4130 Cheapside, Birmingham	A435 in Stratford Place, Birmingham	Declassified after the 1980s.
B4534	A3102 in Freshbrook, Swindon	A4311 in Blunsdon	Begins near M4 J16 and banks in a north-westerly direction. A change in the road system in Blunsdon meant closure of part of the original route at Lady Lane, which is no longer accessible to motor vehicles. The B4534 regains its status at the northern end of Lady Lane where it continues to its terminus at the A4311. Originally ran in Stratford-upon-Avon from Evesham Place to the A34 Birmingham Road. Upgraded to Class I status in the 1970s as the A4134, but within 10 years this was renumbered to a portion of the A4390.
B4535 (defunct)	A422/A439 in Stratford-upon-Avon	A34 in Stratford-upon-Avon	Ran past Shakespeare's birthplace; now pedestrianized.
B4536	B4084 in Pershore	A4104 on the outskirts of Pershore	
B4537	A461 in Wollaston, West Midlands	A458 near Wollaston	
B4538 (defunct)	A45 Western Avenue, Daventry	B4036 in The Market Place, Daventry	Originally portions of the A425 and B4036, but gained its own number after the A45 Western Avenue was built. Declassified after the A45 was rerouted again.
B4539 (defunct)	A41 North Western Avenue, Watford	A412 St Albans Road, Watford	Declassified.
B4540	B4506 near Edlesborough	A5 near Dunstable	
B4541	B489 in Dunstable	B4540 near Whipsnade	
B4542	A4125 in Eastbury	A4125 near Oxhey and A4008 in South Oxhey	
B4543 (defunct)			Reserved in 2003 for the "Dawley Donnington Distributor Road" in Telford. This is probably referring to what is now the B4373, although it is unknown if the B4543 number was ever used on the ground.
B4544	A429 in Coventry	A4600 in Coventry	Former portion of the A46. Originally ran from Stoke Mandeville to Aston Clinton. Downgraded to the C142 in 2003 when Aston Clinton was bypassed.
B4545	A5 at Valley	A5154 at Holyhead	
B4546	A487/A478 road roundabout near Cardigan	Poppit Sands	goes through St Dogmaels
B4547	A4086 at Cwm-y-glo	A4244 / B4366	
B4548	A487 near Cardigan	Gwbert	
B4549	A456 Bewdley Hill at Kidderminster, Worcestershire	A451 Stourport Road at Kidderminster	Sutton Park Road; 1 mile long
B4550	Near A38 in Worcester	Near A4536 in Worcester	Road links Worcester City Centre to the north of Worcester.
B4551	A456/A459 in Halesowen, West Midlands	A491 near Lydiate Ash, Worcestershire	Formerly part of the A459.
B4552 (defunct)	A452 at Castle Bromwich Bridge, Castle Bromwich	A47 Bradford Road, Castle Bromwich	The northern end was split off when M6 J5 was built, and part of the road is now gone, lost under the roundabout. The remainder along Chester Road is now unclassified and Hall Road is now part of a rerouted B4118.
B4553	B4040 in Cricklade	A3102 in Toothill	Originally ran from Tenbury Wells to Leominster. Upgraded to Class I status in the 1960s, becoming an eastern extension of the A4112.
B4554 (defunct)	A483 Wind Street, Ammanford	A483 College Street, Ammanford	Loop off the A483; declassified by the mid-1980s.
B4555	Bridgnorth, Shropshire	B4363 near Highley, Shropshire	
B4556	A476 in Gorslas	A483 at Llandybie	
B4557	A406, Neasden	B4565 at Wembley Stadium	Link road between Wembley Stadium and industrial estates with IKEA store and Tesco in Brent Park Originally ran from Brecon to Bishop's Meadow. Upgraded to Class I status around 1960, becoming the A4062. But when the A40 Brecon bypass opened in 1980, it returned to Class II as the B4602 except for the southernmost section, which was declassified.
B4558	A40 east of Brecon	A4077 southwest of Crickhowell	Parallels A40 in the Usk valley; passes through Pencelli, Talybont-on-Usk, Cwm Crawnon and Llangynidr. Likely classified in the mid-1930s, as it does not appear on a 1934 map, but it does appear on a 1939 map. Also appears on the former A459 north of Dudley. This is a typo for the B4588.
B4559	A4067 in Defynnog	A470 southwest of Brecon	Reclassified to the A4215 around 1970.
B4560	A40 near Bwlch	A4047 at Beaufort, Blaenau Gwent	
B4561 (defunct)	A44 in Worcester	A38 in Worcester	Declassified.
B4562	A469 in Llanishen	B4487 at St Mellons	
B4563	A459, High Holburn, Sedgley	A463, Gospel End Street, Sedgley.	Vicar Street, Sedgley. Passes All Saints Parish Church. Not signed.
B4564	A4093 at Hendreforgan	B4564 at Gilfach Goch	
B4565 (defunct)	A4089 Wembley Park Drive, Wembley	A404 Harrow Road, Wembley	Upgraded to the A479 in 2007 when the new Wembley Stadium opened.
B4566 (defunct)	B461 in Stanmore Marsh	B454 in Neasden	Now the southern end of the A4140.
B4567	A481 north of Llanfaredd	B4594 at Erwood Bridge	
B4568	A470 near Caersws, Powys	B4389 near Newtown, Powys	
B4569	B4518 at Llanidloes, Powys	B4568 at Caersws, Powys	
B4570	A484 near Cardigan	B4333 at Cwm-cou	
B4571	B4333 at Newcastle Emlyn	A486 in Ffostrasol	
B4572	A487 in Aberystwyth	B4353 in Borth	
B4573	A496 at Harlech, Gwynedd	A496	
B4574	A4120 at Devil's Bridge, Aberystwyth	B4518 near Rhayader, Powys	Described by the AA as one of the ten most scenic drives in the world.
B4575	A485 in Llanilar	B4340 in Trawsgoed	
B4576	A485 at Abermad, Ceredigion	B4342 at Nantcwnlle, Ceredigion	
B4577	B4578 at Tyncelyn	A487 at Aberarth	
B4578	A485 at Tyncelyn	A485 at Llanio	
B4579	A5/A483 at Oswestry, Shropshire	B4500 at Glyn Ceiriog, Wrexham	
B4580	A5/A495 at Oswestry, Shropshire	B4391 near Llanfyllin, Powys	
B4581 (defunct)	A487/A4120/B4340 in Penparcau	A44 in Llanbadarn Fawr	Due to its importance, it became an extension of the A4120 in the late 1960s.
B4582	A487 at Llantood, north Pembrokeshire	A487 near Newport, Pembrokeshire	Via Glanrhyd and Nevern
B4583	A487 at St Davids	car park at Whitesands Bay	
B4584	A4139 at Lamphey	unclassified road at Freshwater East	Originally continued north back to the A4139 east of Lamphey, but this was declassified in the 1970s as it was too narrow.
B4585	A4139 at Bier Cross	A4139 at Skrinkle	
B4586	A477 in Broadmoor	A4075 at Yerbeston	
B4587	B4176 in Dudley Town Centre	B4177 in Dudley	
B4587	B4006 in Rodbourne Cheney	B4534 in Haydon Wick	Duplicate number.
B4588	A459 in Upper Gornal, Dudley	B4176 in Dudley town centre	Roads named Burton Road, Highland Road and Salop Street
B4589 (defunct)			Described in the c. 2002 DfT Road List as being located in Telford. The route does not appear on any maps, so it is likely defunct and may have even been a typo on that list.
B4590	B4484 near Willenhall, West Midlands	A462 near Willenhall	Previously part of A463 (later A454) when the first section of The Keyway opened. Not signed as B4590; eastbound is signed as part of the A462 and westbound is signed as part of the B4484.
B4591	B4237 at Newport	A467 at Abercarn	The former A467 route into central Newport.
~~B4592~~	unused		
B4593	A4067 at Mumbles	Caswell Bay	
B4594	A44 near Walton, Powys	B4567 near Erwood	
B4595	A4058 near Pontypridd	A4119 at Talbot Green	Road originally started at Llantwit Fardre but following the completion of the Church Village bypass, most of the former A473 route became part of the B4595. The A4058 near Glyntaff also became part of the B4595. This road also has three road links, one near the A470 in Glyntaff where the A4058 originally started, the other in Tonteg near Powerstation hill and another near Beddau where the A473 originally ran.
B4596	B4591 at Newport	B4236 at Caerleon Bridge	The former A449 route into central Newport.
~~B4597~~	unused		
B4598	A4042/A465/A40 at Abergavenny	A472 at Usk	Former A471 and A40.
B4599	A4067 in Ystalyfera	A4067 near Penrhos	

== B4600 to B4801 ==
Road	From	To	Notes
B4600	Penrhos roundabout (A468/A469)	Crossways roundabout (A468)	Former routing of the A468 through Caerphilly.
B4601	A470/A40 roundabout east of Brecon, Powys	A470/A40 roundabout southwest of Llanfaes near Brecon, Powys	former route of A40 prior to construction of Brecon Bypass
B4602	A470 junction northeast of Brecon, Powys	B4601 Heol Gouesnou, Brecon,	former route of A470 prior to construction of Brecon Bypass
B4603	A483/A4118 junction at Greenhill, Swansea	A4067 near Cilmaengwyn	
~~B4604~~ - ~~B4619~~	unused		
B4620	A483 at Fforestfach	A4240 at Loughor	
~~B4621~~	unused		
B4622	A473 at Brynitirion, Bridgend	A48 Bridgend bypass	
B4623 (defunct)			Number apparently appears on a slightly blurred late 1950s map along Wales Farm Road in North Acton, but the true number is not known. Now part of the A4000 one-way system.
B4623 (defunct)			Assigned to the former A469 through Caerphilly; although the number seems to be a typo for the B4263, it did appear on maps as well as on official documentation in the 2000s. Possibly due to confusion, the section south of the B4600 is now part of the B4263 and the northern section is now unclassified.
B4624	A44 at Evesham	A4184 at Evesham	Worcester Road.
B4625	A4067 at Tircanol	Lon-las Interchange (M4 J44)	Unsigned
~~B4626~~ - ~~B4629~~	unused		
B4630	Noke roundabout (A405), Chiswell Green	A5183 in St. Albans	Former portion of the A412.
~~B4631~~	unused		
B4632	Stratford-upon-Avon	Cheltenham	Old A46. Passes through Winchcombe, Prestbury, near Stanton, Broadway, Aston-sub-Edge, Wootton-sub-Edge, Mickleton, Clifford Chambers
B4633	A40 in Cheltenham	A419 in Cheltenham	Was the B4076 in 1922 and later an extension of the B4075. Route not signed.
B4634	B4063 at Staverton Bridge	A4019 at Uckington	Was the B4063 before it was extended over the former A40.
B4635	A4251, Tring	A41, Drayton Beauchamp	Old A4251. Passes through the town of Tring meeting the B488 on the first and last junction with the B4009. Covers the old A4251/A41 route.
B4636	B4205 at Worcester	A4538 at Tibberton	Existed in 1922, but not classified until the 2000s.
B4637	B4205 in Worcester	B4638 at Woodgreen	
B4638	B4636 at Lyppard Grange	B4639 at Warndon	
B4639	B4550 at Blackpole	A4440 at Warndon	
B4640	Newbury	Tot Hill	Former portion of the A34 road; out-of-zone as it runs south of the A4. Until it was replaced by the Newbury Bypass it was originally the only part of the road between Oxford and Winchester that was not a dual carriageway. Unknown why the B4640 number was chosen as it has no relation to the A34.
B4641	Brockworth Interchange (M5 J11A)	Gloucester Business Park	
B4642	A4071 south west of Rugby, Warwickshire	A426 in central Rugby	Old route of the A4071 before the building of the Rugby Western Relief Road.
B4643	B4528 at Patterdown Farm	A4 at Rowden Hill	Formerly the A350 before it was rerouted onto what is now the B4528. Some maps label the route as the B4634 (a typo).
~~B4644~~ - ~~B4649~~	unused		
B4650 (reserved)			Reserved in 2006 for a downgrade of the A417 between Cirencester and Faringdon. The road has not yet been numbered and there are currently no plans to do so.
~~B4651~~ - ~~B4665~~	unused		
B4666	Dodwells Roundabout (A5/A47) in Hinckley	B590 (Hinckley inner ring road) at Hinckley	Out-of-zone as it runs east of the A5; former portion of the A47.
B4667	B590 in Hinckley	A47 Hinckley northern bypass	Given a Zone 4 number, despite it existing north of the A5; former portion of the A447.
B4668	B590 in Hinckley	A47 Hinckley northern bypass	Out-of-zone as it runs east of the A5; former portion of the A47.
B4669	B590 at Hinckley	B4114 at Sapcote	Was the B579 from 1922 to 1926, the A5070 from 1926 to the late 1970s and the B4069 from then until 1990. Given a Zone 4 number, despite existing north of the A5.
~~B4670~~ - ~~B4695~~	unused		
B4696	A419 north of Latton	B4042 west of Royal Wootton Bassett	Runs west through gravel workings and the Cotswold Water Park as Spine Road (begun 1971), then turns south on older road through Ashton Keynes towards Wootton Bassett.
~~B4697~~ - ~~B4729~~	unused		
B4730 (defunct)			Typo for the B4130.
~~B4731~~ - ~~B4739~~	unused		
B4800			Section of former A483 in Newtown, designated in 2019 after the town's bypass opened.
B4801			Section of former A489 in Newtown, designated in 2019 after the town's bypass opened.
