= A490 road =

Road in Wales

Coordinates: 52.63379°N 3.15097°W

A490

Route information
- Length: 22.0 mi (35.4 km)

Major junctions
- South end: Churchstoke
- A489 A483 A458 A495
- North end: Llanfyllin

Location
- Country: United Kingdom
- Primary destinations: Welshpool

Road network
- Roads in the United Kingdom; Motorways; A and B road zones

The A490 is a road in the United Kingdom running from Churchstoke, Powys to Llanfyllin, also in Powys. The road runs for a short distance through Shropshire in England.

== The route ==
The road starts in Churchstoke at a junction with the A489. From here it heads north, crossing over the border into Shropshire, and passes through Chirbury. After Chirbury it crosses back into Powys and past Forden. It then crosses over the River Severn and heads by Welshpool Airport. It crosses the A483 approximately 1 mile south of Welshpool and then runs through the town's western suburbs before joining the A458 in the town centre. The two A-routes run together for less than a mile; at Raven Square roundabout the A490 splits off from the A458 and continues north. It crosses the River Vyrnwy before joining for a short distance the A495. A few miles after splitting off from the A495 it reaches Llanfyllin, and shortly after ends by splitting into the B4391 and B4393 roads.
