= Mansell Gamage =

Village in Herefordshire, England

Coordinates: 52.097°N 2.885°W

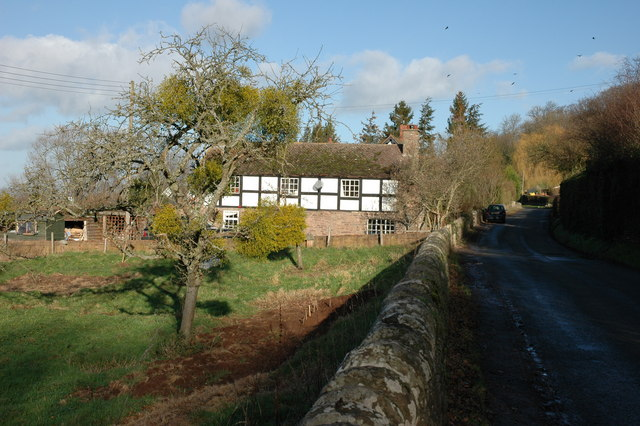
Cottage in Mansell Gamage

Mansell Gamage is a village and civil parish in Herefordshire, England. It is on the B4230 road and is near the A438 road.
