= A4138 road =

Road in Wales

A4138

Route information
- Length: 4.97 mi (8.00 km)

Major junctions
- East end: A48 at Pontarddulais
- M4
- West end: A484 at Parc Trostre

Location
- Country: United Kingdom
- Primary destinations: Llanelli

Road network
- Roads in the United Kingdom; Motorways; A and B road zones

The A4138 is a main road in Carmarthenshire, Wales, connecting Pontarddulais with Llanelli. Running in a northeast to southwest direction, the road connects with M4 junction 48. Northeast of the motorway, the road is classified as a non-primary route, while southwest of the motorway, the road is classified as a primary route. In both instances, the road is operated by Carmarthenshire County Council.

== Proposals ==
- There have been proposals to make the southwestern section from the M4 to Llanelli a trunk road, which would be operated by the Welsh Government, but these have been rejected.
- The local council has a policy to reject any planning application that would prevent or adversely affect the implementation of a dual carriageway between the M4 and Trostre.

== Places served ==
Settlements served by the road include:

- Pontarddulais
- Hendy
- Llangennech
- Dafen
- Llanelli
