= Vicarage Gate =

Street in Kensington, London

Coordinates: 51.5047°N 0.1926°W

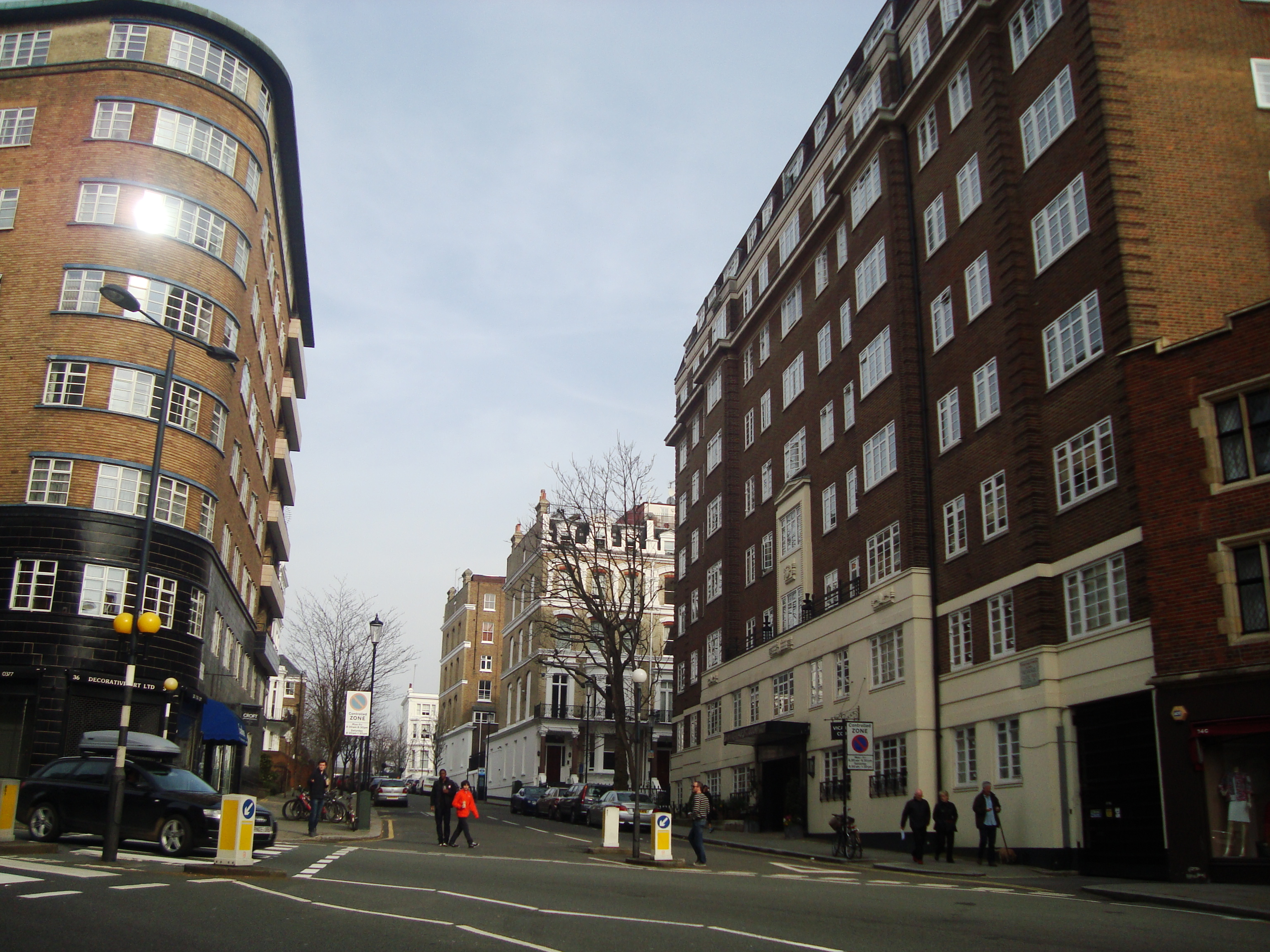
Vicarage Gate

Vicarage Gate is a street in Kensington, London W8. In April 2024, it was reckoned to be the second most expensive street in the UK, after Buckingham Gate, with an average asking price of over £6.3 million.
