= A458 road =

Road in England & Wales

A458

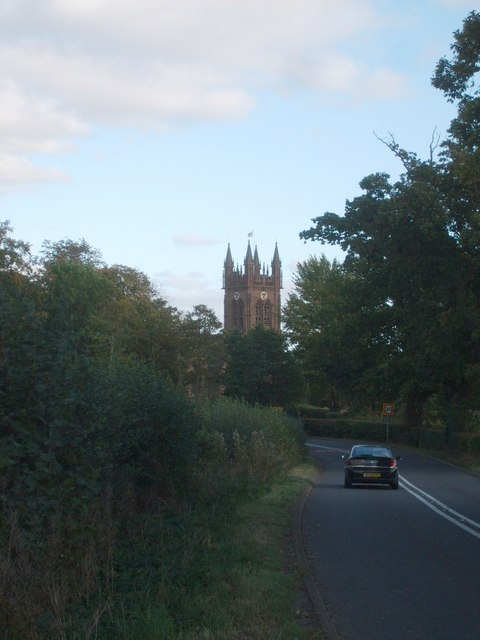

Route information
- Maintained by National Highways, English local authorities and North & Mid Wales Trunk Road Agency
- Length: 86 mi (138 km)

Major junctions
- West end: Mallwyd
- A470 A495 A490 A483; A5; A49 A4169 A442 A454 A449 A491 A459 A456
- East end: Halesowen

Location
- Country: United Kingdom
- Primary destinations: Welshpool, Shrewsbury, Bridgnorth, Stourbridge

Road network
- Roads in the United Kingdom; Motorways; A and B road zones

The A458 is a route on the UK highway network that runs from Mallwyd, near Machynlleth, in Wales, merging with the A456 Hagley Road and the Quinton Expressway on the outskirts of Birmingham, in England. On the way it passes through Welshpool, Shrewsbury, Much Wenlock, Bridgnorth, Stourbridge and Halesowen.

== History ==
=== Welshpool to Shrewsbury ===
The road was one of several from "Welch Gate and Cotton Hill" (sic) turnpiked on 1758. Between Buttington and Halfway House the original course of the road was abandoned after it was disturnpiked in 1837. It was replaced by a new road built along the foot of Moelygolfa (hill), built in 1801. This Turnpike Trust ended in 1877.

=== Shrewsbury to Bridgnorth ===
This road is likely to be Anglo-Saxon in origin, as it links the burhs of Bridgnorth and Shrewsbury. It was used by the army of Henry I, which cleared trees near it on Wenlock Edge to make the road safe. The road was turnpiked in 1752, the trust being solely concerned with this road. It remained a turnpike until 1875.

The Bridgnorth bypass, opened in 1985, was classified as A458, taking the main road around the south of the town, previously it ran through Low Town, but ran along low ground at the foot of the hillside up to the town centre.

=== Bridgnorth to Quinton ===
The final section of the road was a late creation, consisting of a road laid out in 1805 when Morfe Heath was enclosed (as far as Six Ashes and then various existing roads for the rest of its route. This was turnpiked in 1816 and remained under the control of a trust until 1877. It terminates in the Quinton area on Halesowen's border with Birmingham and Oldbury. The split junction with Stourbridge Ring Road on the western side of the town replaced the formerly two way narrow section of the road but which necessitated the demolition of buildings on the new alignment.

Until the 1950s, it terminated in Halesowen town centre, but was extended approximately two miles eastwards in the 1950s along the former route of the A456, which was by-passed on a new road around the south of the town.

== See also ==
- Trunk roads in Wales
