= Llandinabo =

Hamlet and civil parish in Herefordshire, England

Coordinates: 51°57′N 2°42′W

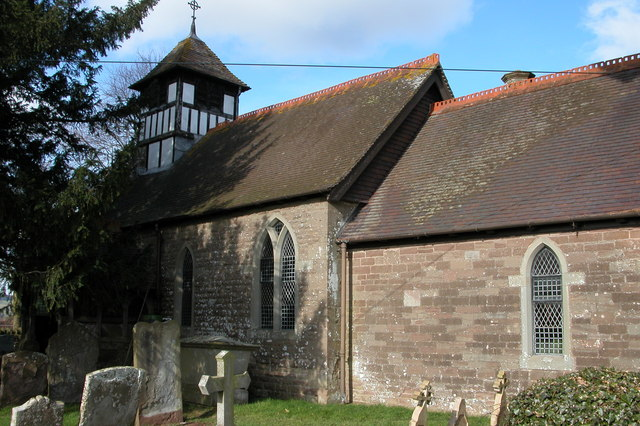

Llandinabo is a hamlet and civil parish in Herefordshire, England, and approximately six miles north-west of Ross-on-Wye. The population of the civil parish at the 2011 census was 59. The placename is Welsh and means "church of St Junabius".
