= A419 road =

Road in Wiltshire and Gloucestershire

Coordinates: 51.71395°N 2.00475°W

A419

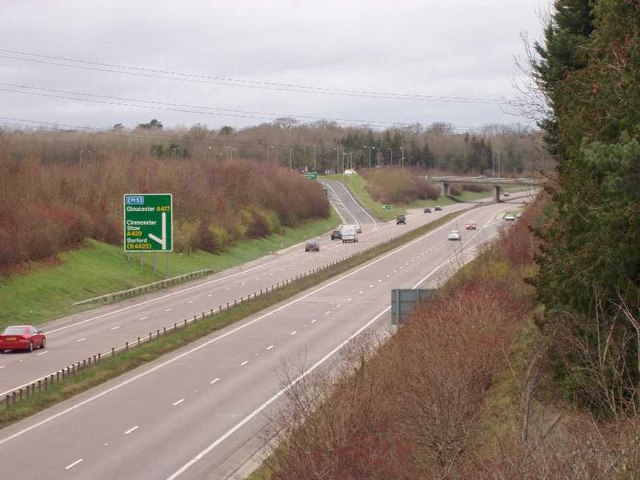
- The divergence of the A419 and A417

Route information
- Length: 36 mi (58 km)

Major junctions
- Southeast end: Swindon
- M4 J15; M5 J13 A420 A361 A417 A433 A429; A46; A38
- Northwest end: Whitminster

Location
- Country: United Kingdom
- Primary destinations: Cirencester; Stroud

Road network
- Roads in the United Kingdom; Motorways; A and B road zones
← A418	→ A420

The A419 road is a primary route between Chiseldon near Swindon at junction 15 of the M4 with the A346 road, and Whitminster in Gloucestershire, England near the M5 motorway. The A419 is managed and maintained by a private company, Road Management Group, on behalf of the UK Department for Transport.

== Route ==
From the M4 to Cirencester it is a dual carriageway road, which generally follows the course of the Roman road Ermin Way, but dualling work completed in the late 1990s, and the bypass of Cirencester, has taken it off-course in some places. East of Cirencester the A417 continues straight ahead as the major road and the A419 separates through Cirencester and Stroud, becoming mainly single carriageway. West of Cirencester the road loses its primary status; it crosses the M5 at junction 13 close to a former Little Chef restaurant, then finishes 0.4 miles (0.64 km) further west at a roundabout with the A38.

== A419 Road Bridge ==
The A419 Road Bridge is a modern bridge carrying the Cricklade by-pass section of the A419 across the River Thames in the county of Wiltshire.

The bridge is just east of the town and is a concrete construction carrying a dual carriageway, built as part of the two-mile (3.2 km) £2.4m Blunsdon-Cricklade Improvement which opened in June 1988.

== History ==
When it was first designated in 1922, the A419 ran from Hungerford, Berkshire, to Gloucester. Before the war, the section from Cirencester to Gloucester was renumbered the A417, and the A419 was extended from Cirencester to Stroud and then on part of the route of the former A434 through Stonehouse to a junction with the A38 at Hardwicke, just south of Gloucester.

Following the opening of the M4 motorway, the section from Hungerford via Aldbourne and Liddington to Commonhead was downclassified to the B4192. The old lay-bys remain, showing that this was once a major route south. The road was extended south from Commonhead for 0.8 miles (1.3 km) to the M4, on the route of the old A345.

When the M5 motorway was opened, the road was rerouted west of Stroud. A new alignment, known as the Ebley by-pass, was built south of the old route from Cainscross to a point just south of Stonehouse, and from there the road was rerouted on the former line of the A4096 to Eastington, and then to the M5 and the A38 at Whitminster. The old route became the B4008.

Around 1971, a junction was created north of Cricklade with the newly built Spine Road (B4696) which runs west through the Cotswold Water Park.

The 3-mile (4.8 km) £4m Stratton St. Margaret (Swindon) Bypass opened in October 1977, the 2-mile (3.2 km) £2.4m Blunsdon-Cricklade Improvement opened in June 1988 and the 4-mile (6.4 km) Latton Bypass opened on 24 December 1997.

A bottleneck in Swindon at Blunsdon traffic lights and the nearby Turnpike roundabout, where local traffic mixes with through traffic for the M4 and the Cotswolds, was addressed by construction of a dual-carriageway bypass in 2006–2009. A flyover at Commonhead, the main junction for southeast Swindon and another source of congestion, was opened to traffic in 2007.

Parts of the newly dualled sections of road are surfaced in concrete, which is relatively unusual in the UK. The high tyre noise generated by this surface is unpopular with nearby residents.

== Management contract ==
The A419 is managed and maintained by Road Management Services (Gloucester) Ltd which receives income in the form of shadow tolls based on the volume of traffic. The 30-year contract expires in 2026. In 2018, the company made a profit before tax of £4.5 million on turnover of £17.8 million.

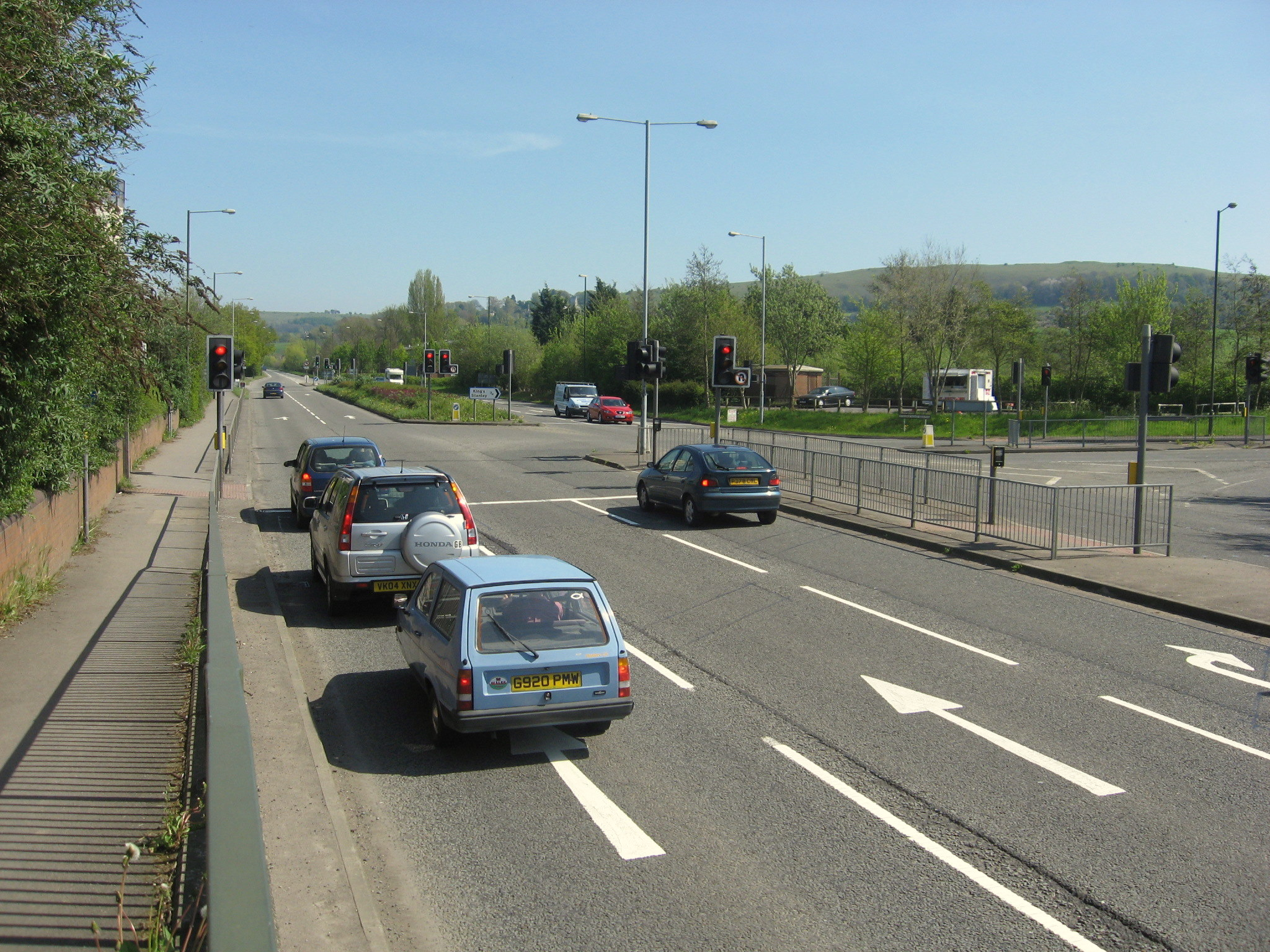
A419 Ebley bypass, looking towards Stroud

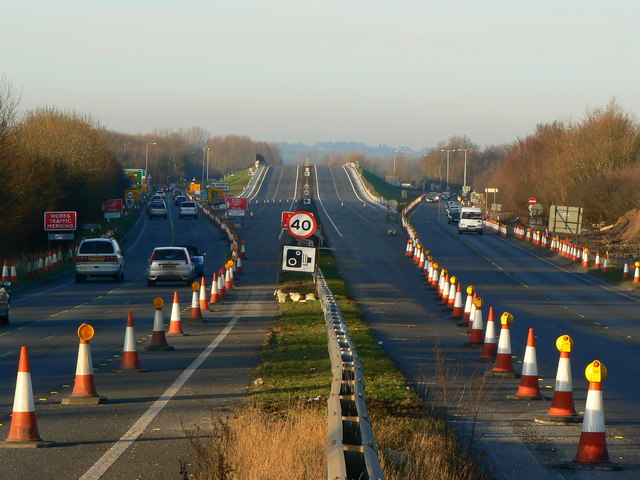
Looking north towards Common Head, Swindon before the opening of a new flyover

== See also ==
- The Golden Valley Line – a railway line serving a similar route
- List of crossings of the River Thames
