= B4008 road =

B road in Gloucestershire, England

B4008 (formerly part of the A434) is a B road in Gloucestershire, England that starts in Quedgeley and ends in Stroud. The road goes south from Quedgeley, passes near Hardwicke, intersects the M5 motorway at Junction 12, passes through Stonehouse, then turns east through the Ebley area before ending in Cainscross, Stroud. The road is 9.1 miles (14.6 km) in length.

The B4008 is a single carriageway with speed limits of 30 mph (48 km/h) through Quedgeley, Hardwicke, Stonehouse and Ebley. Between Hardwicke and Stroud the speed limit varies between 50 mph (80 km/h) and the Single Carriageway National Speed Limit (60 mph (97 km/h)).

== History ==
The road used to be the A434 and a small section of the A38. In 1935, the A434 was merged into the A419. In 1971, due to the building of the M5, the A419 was redirected to intersect it and the road between Hardwicke and Stonehouse was then renamed the B4008. The road was later extended in both directions, taking over former sections of the A38 and A419.
