= Parc Trostre =

Retail park in Llanelli, Wales

Coordinates: 51°40′36″N 4°08′21″W

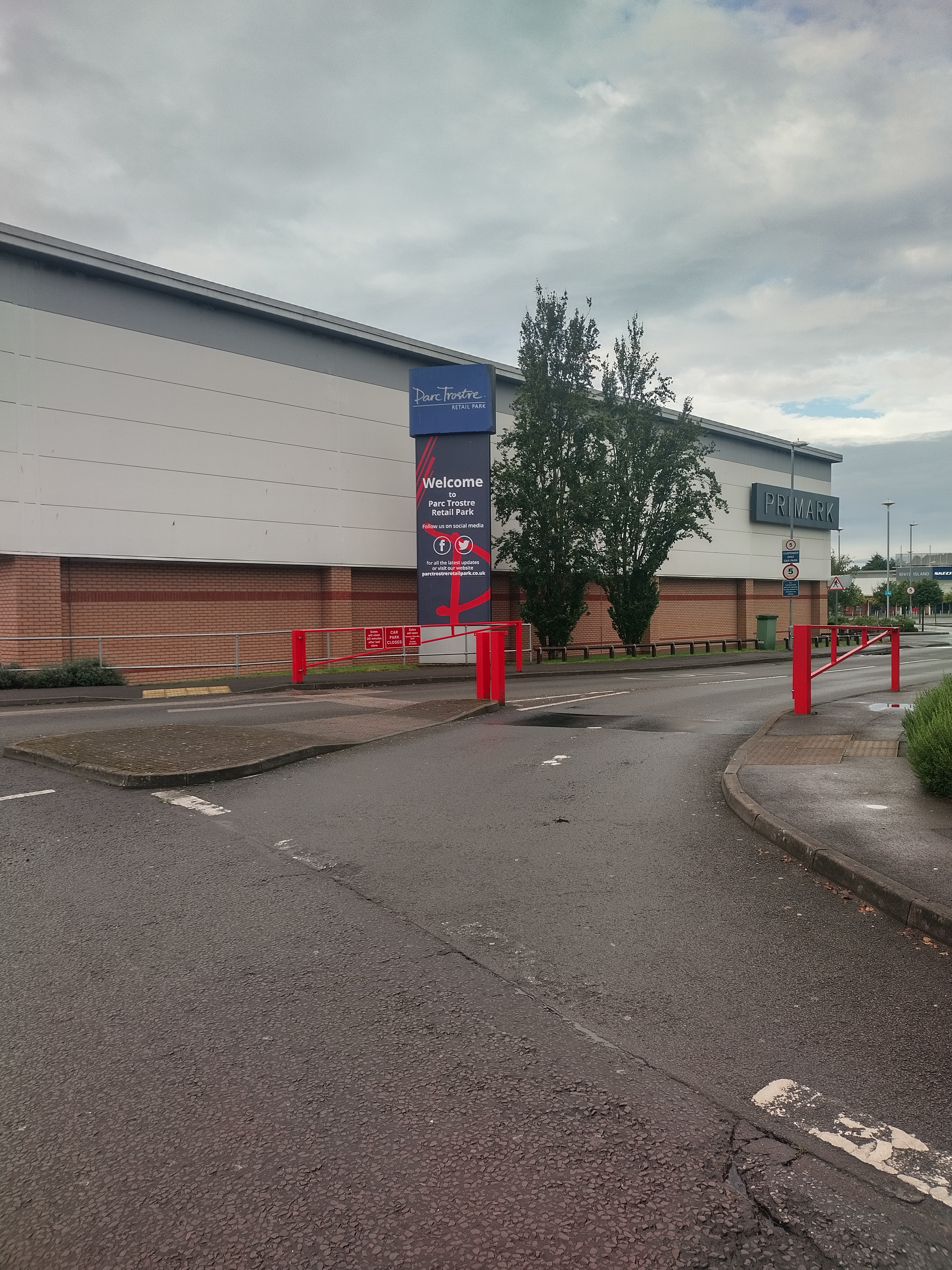
Entrance to Parc Trostre

Parc Trostre is a retail park in Llanelli, Carmarthenshire, Wales.

The first phase of the development occurred in 1988, consisting of stores such as Tesco. Halfords, which also had a store in Stepney Street, was the next big name to make the move and opened in Trostre in the early 1990s, followed by furniture retailer MFI, Carpetright and DIY chain Great Mills. In September 2008, the growing popularity of the retail park led Llanelli Town Council to express concern at the increasing adverse impact which the continued expansion of Parc Trostre is having on Llanelli town centre.

In August 2014 Parc Trostre was purchased by asset management company M&G Real Estate for £156m.

In January 2023 plans for a new Lidl store, drive-though coffee shop, and three other retail units at Parc Trostre were turned down by Carmarthenshire County Council.

== Controversies ==
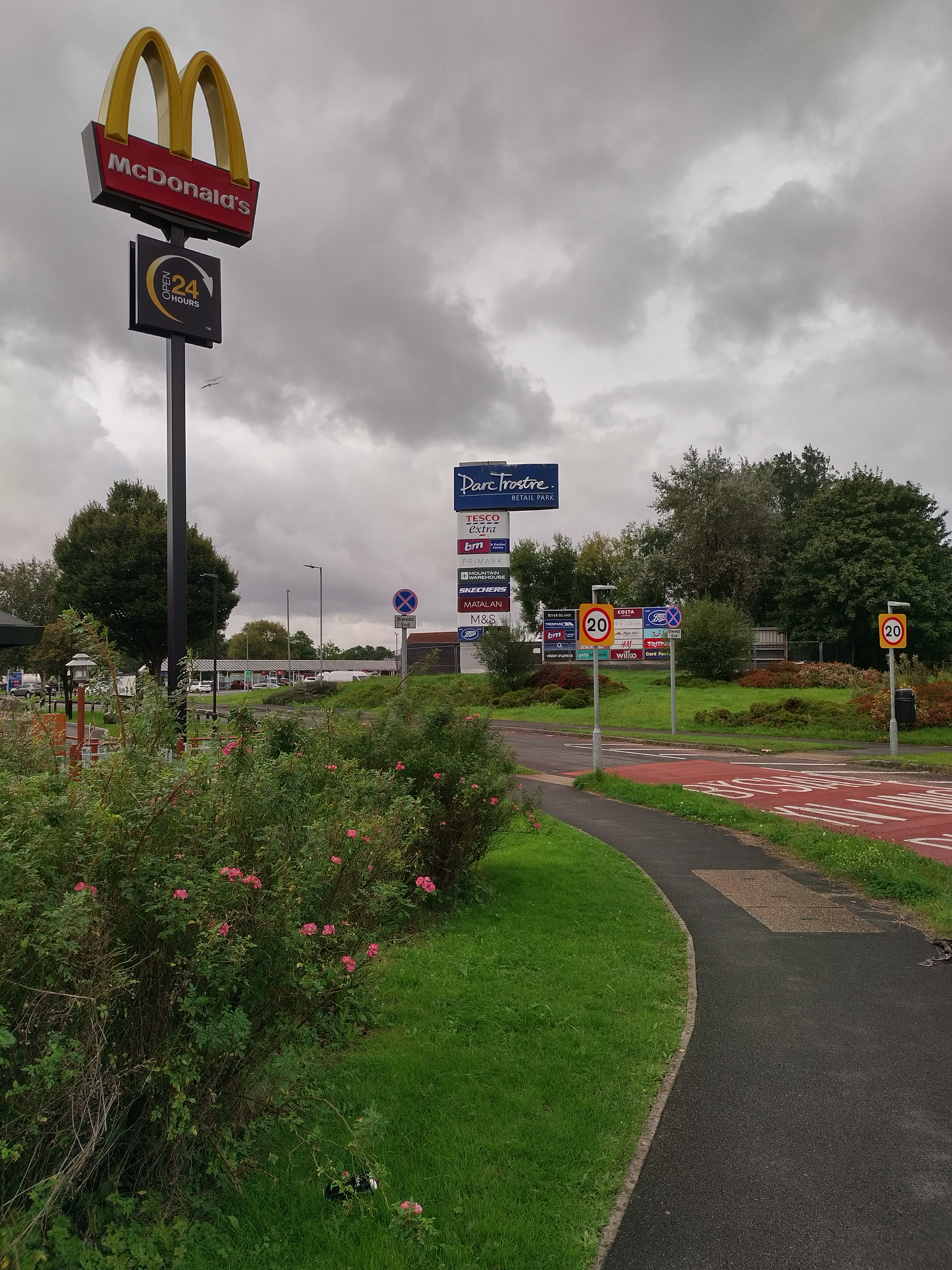
Parc Trostre Roundabout exit in question

In March 2024 Trostre Roundabout made national news when it was revealed that between December 2022 to November 2023 Carmarthenshire Council made over £500,000 in fines because more than 15,000 drivers took the wrong exit and drove down a bus lane. Many of the motorists as well as the Welsh Conservative candidate at the time Charlie Evans believe that better signage should be in place to help solve the problem.
