= Birdlip Mirror =

English historical artefact

The Birdlip Mirror
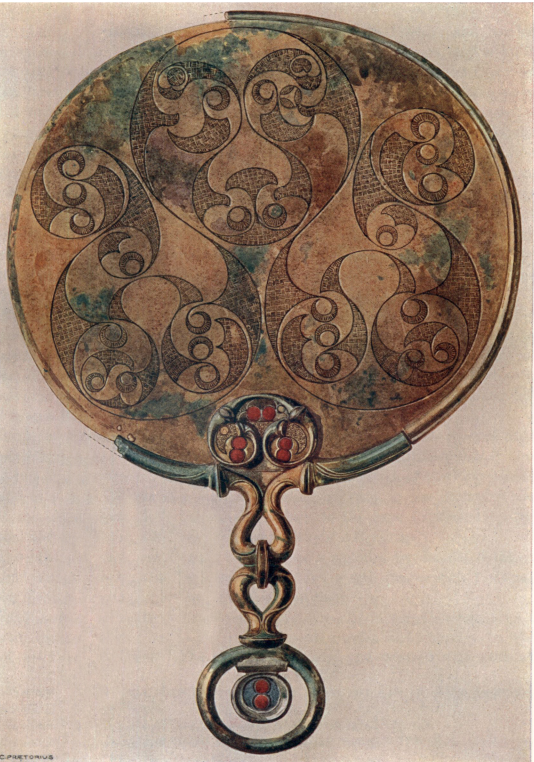
- Drawing of the mirror's decorated back, c. 1903
- Material: bronze, vitreous enamel
- Size: height: 27.5 cm (10.8 in); width (max): 26.5 cm (10.4 in)
- Created: early 1st-century BC
- Discovered: 1879; Birdlip, Gloucestershire, England
- Discovered by: workmen digging for stone
- Present location: Museum of Gloucester, England

The Birdlip Mirror is an intricately decorated ornamented bronze mirror from the late-Iron Age. It was found in 1879 near Birdlip, Gloucestershire in England, and is dated to c. 100 BC – 50 BC. It has a cast handle and a kidney-shaped mirror plate which is highly polished on its front to achieve reflectivity. The reverse contains intricate engraved and chased curvilinear patterns in the Insular La Tène style.

It was discovered alongside a silver gilt brooch, an amber necklace, and two bowls and bracelets made of bronze and silver. The objects were found next to the skeletons of a woman in her mid-30s—presumed to be its then and final owner— who had been buried alongside two men. It is believed that the woman was buried c. 50 AD. The bodies and high-quality artefacts are collectively known as the "Birdlip Grave Group".

The Birdlip Grave Group objects are now in the collection of the Museum of Gloucester.

== The Birdlip Grave Group ==
The site was discovered in 1879 by the quarryman Joseph Barnfield, while digging for stone at Barrow Wake, close to the road between Birdlip and Crickley at the feet of the Cotswold Hills. It consisted of the skeletal remains of two males in plots on either side of an adult female who had been buried with several high-value metal grave goods. The bodies had been placed in a line with their feet pointing south and their heads toward the east. The mirror was found alongside the woman. A bronze bowl had been placed over her face, while the face of one of the males was covered by a metal-rimmed object resembling a bucket. No other objects were found around the male skeletons. The bodies were enclosed in cists (small stone coffin-like boxes or chests) with the slabs placed on edge and covered by whitewashed limestone flags.

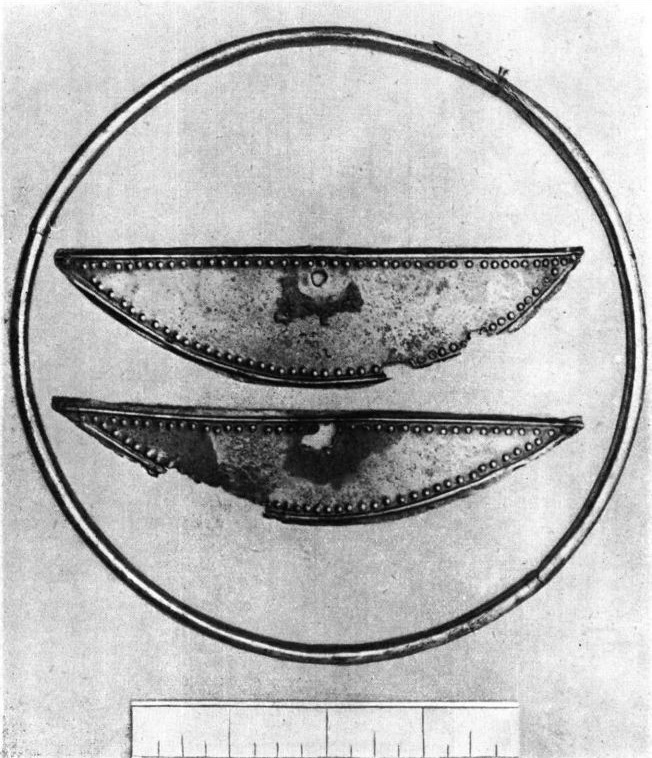
Drawing of the Birdlip bronze bowl, 1st-century AD

The woman's grave contained several other high-quality pieces of jewellery that indicate female ownership. These include bracelets made of bronze and silver, a multi-piece amber necklace, a silver-gilt brooch and four bronze rings. The quality of these objects strongly suggests that the female was of high status. Also found were a smaller bowl and a bronze knife handle with a terminal shaped as a bull's head.

The site's prominent location overlooking the Severn Valley may originally have been under a large burial mound (barrow), as the findspot's name "Barrow Wake" suggests.

Due to the dating of the find and the lack of contemporary record-keeping, there is limited contextual information surrounding the burials; some of the accounts of its rediscovery, including the exact location, are conflicting. Shortly after, a contemporary male body was found in a shallow grave about 18 meters away from the main site. He had been buried with an iron sword and the badly corroded remnants of a bronze bucket.

The woman is estimated to have been around 35 years old at death. She has not been identified, although several theories as to her status have been proposed by both archaeologists and local and popular historians. The most fanciful is that she was Boudica, queen of the ancient British Iceni tribe, who led a failed uprising against the conquering forces of the Roman Empire c. AD 60. However, no conclusive evidence has been found to support this claim. A reconstruction of her face was created by the Museum of Gloucester in the early 21st century.

== Description ==
The mirror is made from enamelled bronze and is formed from three pieces: the mirror plate, the cast handle and the tubular binding strip around the mirror's edge.

=== Mirror plate ===
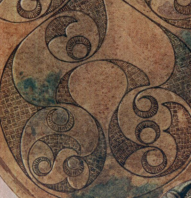
Detail of patterns on the mirror's lower left-hand side (c. 1903 drawing)

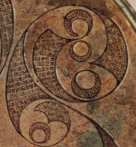
Detail of patterns on the mirror's top right-hand side (c. 1903 drawing)

The reverse of the mirror is decorated with some 77 individual intricate engraved and chased curvilinear patterns in the La Tène style, which are filled in with basket hatching.

The pattern's outlines were engraved twice, initially with a fine round-nosed graver before being reworked more deeply with a common graver.

=== Handle ===
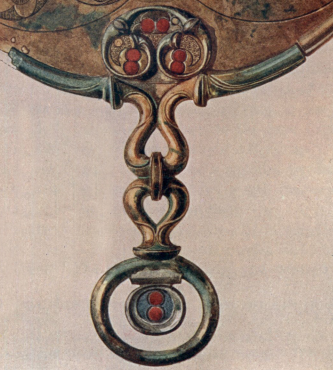
The handle (from the c. 1903 drawing)

The handle contains a slot used to fix it to the mirror plate. It is large and complex compared to other surviving Iron Age mirrors. It is made from cast bronze and decorated with red glass enamel inlay.

The terminal ring contains a separate inner circular area, but it appears to have been repaired or replaced at some point. This is deduced from the fact that some of the metal at its top has been cut away, and the join of the terminal to the inner circular area has been precisely fitted into this gap. Based on this, the archaeologist Jody Joy has speculated that the inner circle is a later addition, and thus "a period of time elapsed between the mirror's manufacture and deposition."

== Condition ==
Because of the short time between its creation and burial, the mirror is in very good condition and has suffered little corrosion. Some of the edging on the left-hand side of the decorated plate is missing, revealing striations (markings) likely used to secure the edgings to the plate. The centre of the mirror plate contains a punch mark which may have been sustained after rediscovery or made as part of the object's construction. The undecorated side still retains much of its original reflectivity.

== Function and type ==
The Cetic bronze mirrors are believed to have been produced as ceremonial jewellery for personal use by high-status women; likely the wives of chieftains. Most of the major pieces were rediscovered in graves alongside other high-value objects.

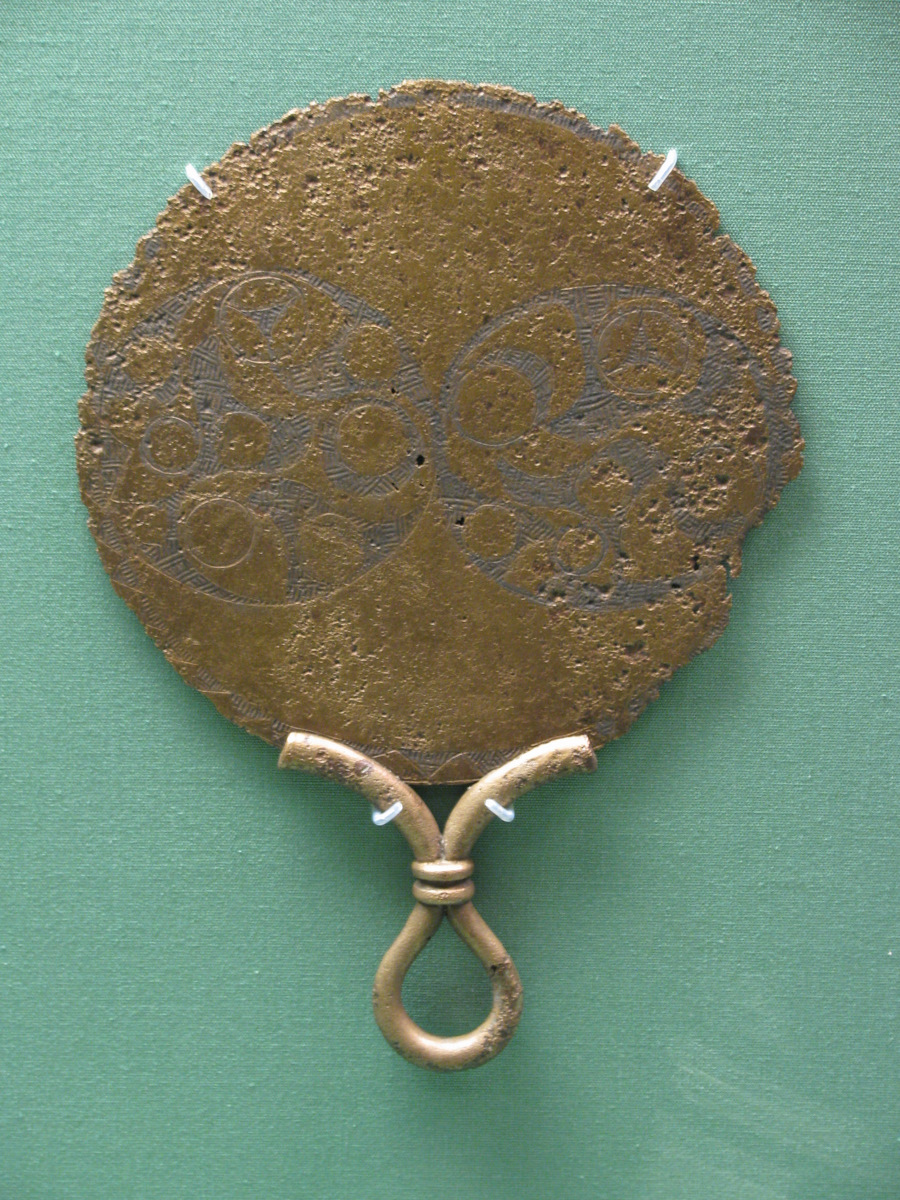
The St. Keverne Mirror, c. 50 BC – 50 AD, found in 1873, British Museum, London

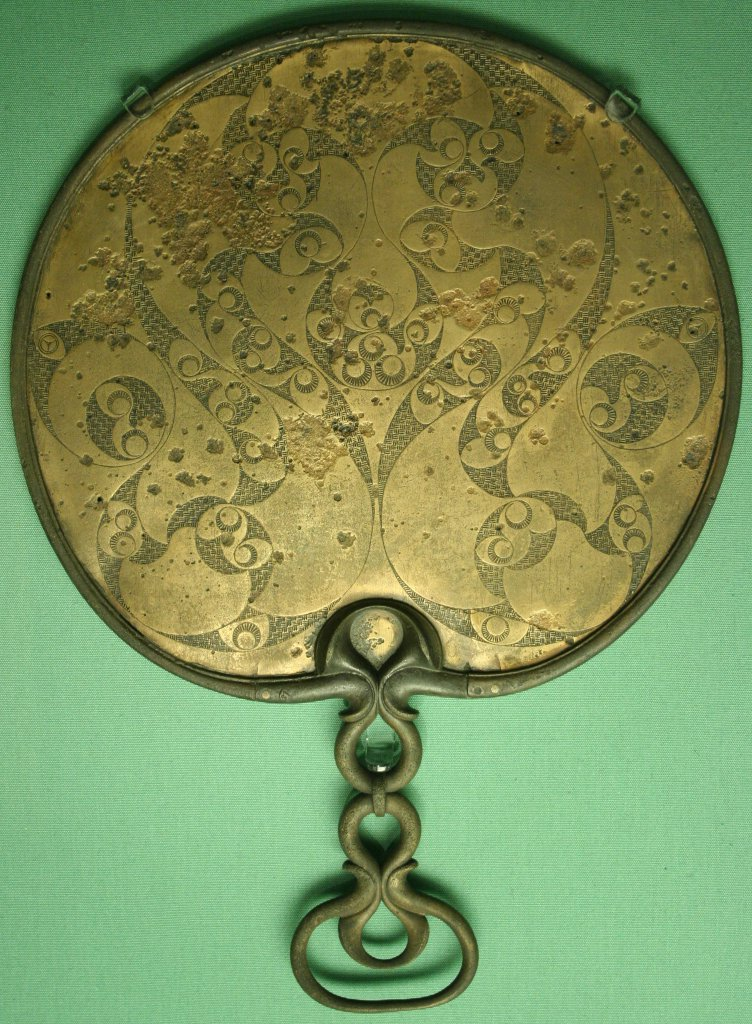
The Desborough Mirror, c. 50 BC – 50 AD, found in 1908, British Museum.

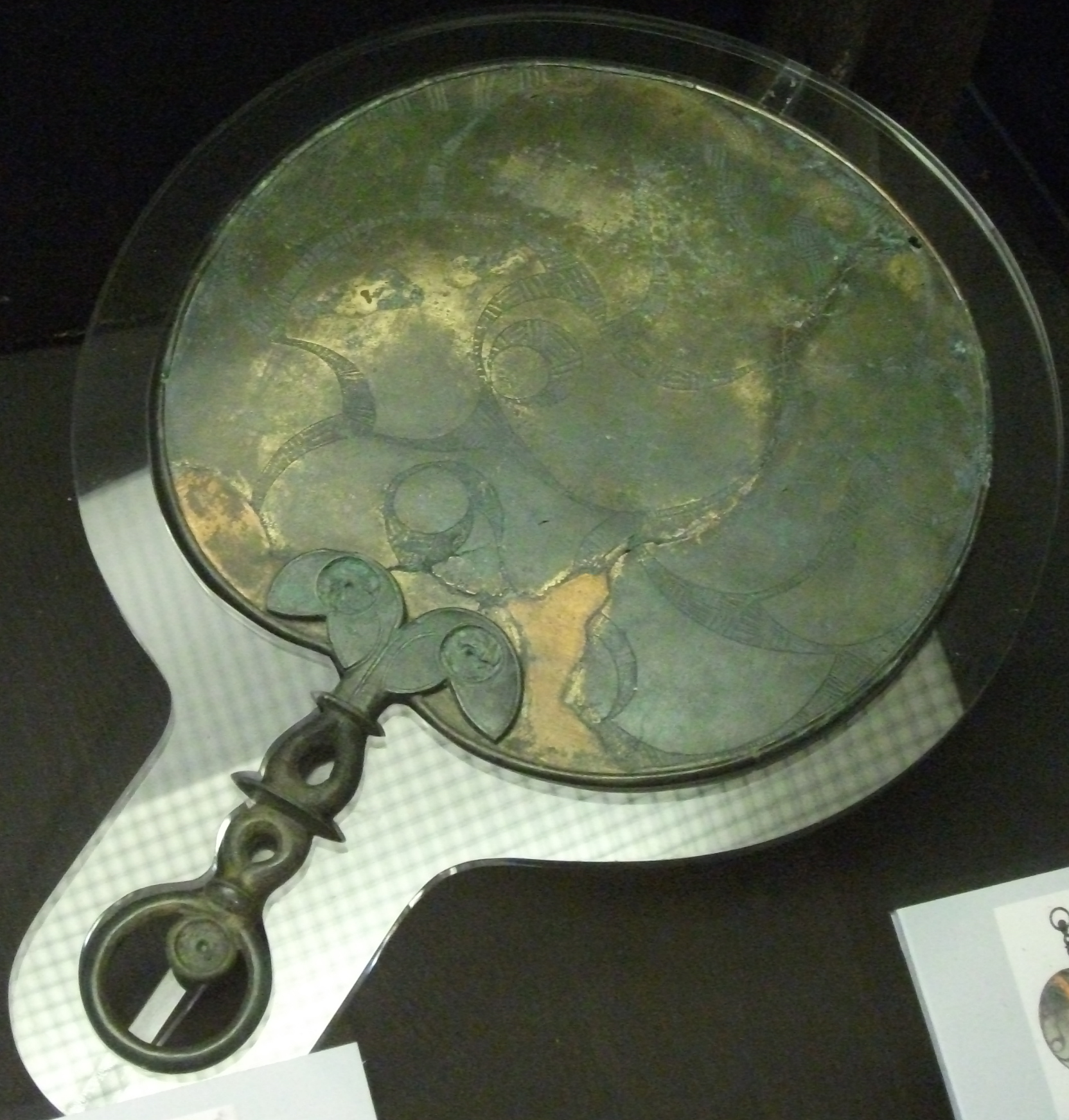
The Warden Mirror, c. 50 BC – 50 AD, The Higgins Art Gallery & Museum, Bedford, England

== Sources ==
- Allen,John Romilly. Celtic Art in Pagan and Christian Times. London: Methuen & Co., 1904
- Bellows, John. "On Some Bronze and other articles found near Birdlip". Bristol and Gloucestershire Archaeological Society, volume 137, 1881
- Green, Charles. "The Birdlip Early Iron Age Burials: a Review". Proceedings of the Prehistoric Society, volume 15, 1949. pp. 188-190. doi:10.1017/S0079497X00019289
- Joy, Jody. "Exploring status and identity in later Iron Age Britain: reinterpreting mirror burials". In: Moore, Tom; Armada, Xosé-Lois. Atlantic Europe in the First Millennium BC: Crossing the Divid. Oxford: Oxford University Press, 2011. ISBN 978-0-1995-6795-9
- Joy, Jody. Iron Age Mirrors: A Biographical Approach. Oxford: British Archeological Reports, 2010. ISBN 1-4073-0703-7
- Joy, Jody. "Reflections on Celtic Art: a re-examination of mirror decoration". In: Garrow, Duncan (ed). Rethinking Celtic Art. Oxford: Oxbow Books, 2008. ISBN 978-1-8421-7318-3
- Lowery, P.R.; Savage, R.D.A.; Wilkins, R.L. "A Technical Study of the Designs on the British Mirror Series". Proceedings of the Prehistoric Society, 1972. ISSN 0079-497X doi:10.1017/S0079497X00007003
- Shirokova, Nadezhda. "The art of the British Celts. A critical review". Studia Antiqua et Archaeologica, volume 21, number 2, 2015. pp. 189–208.
- Smith, Reginald. "On a Late-Celtic Mirror found at Desborough, Northants, and other Mirrors of the Period". Archaeologia, volume 61, issue 2, 1909. ISSN 2051-3186 doi:10.1017/S0261340900010109
- Staelens, Yvette. "The Birdlip Cemetery". Transactions of the Bristol and Gloucestershire Archaeological Society, volume 100, 1983. pp. 19–31. ISSN 0068-1032
- Tildesley, Miriam. "Archæological Evidence for the Date of Cist Graves, Rathlin Island". Royal Anthropological Institute of Great Britain and Ireland, volime 29, June 1929. pp. 100–110. JSTOR 2789040
