= List of road junctions in the United Kingdom: 0-A =

This is a partial list of road junctions in the United Kingdom.

Many road junctions are named after pubs. For more information regarding the derivation of pub names, see pub names.

== 0-9 ==
Junction name	Type	Location	Roads	Grid reference	Notes
The 101 Roundabout	Roundabout	Flitwick/Ampthill	A507; A5120 Ampthill Road; Flitwick Road	52°01′00″N 0°30′05″W	
3m Roundabout	Roundabout	Bracknell	A329; B3018; B3408; Bond Way	51.418°N 0.755°W	

== A ==
Junction name	Type	Location	Roads	Grid reference	Notes
Abbey Hill Interchange	Roundabout Interchange	Wymbush, Milton Keynes	A5; H3 (A422) Monks Way; V5 Great Monks Street	52°02′51″N 0°48′16″W	
Addlestonemoor Roundabout	Roundabout	Chertsey, Surrey	A317 St Peter's Way; A317 Woburn Hill; A317 Chertsey Road; A318 Chertsey Road	TQ050657	
Admiralty	Roundabout Interchange	Rosyth, Scotland	M90 J1; A90; A985 Admiralty Road; A921 Admiralty Road	56°02′37″N 3°24′17″W	
Ainley Top	Roundabout	Huddersfield, West Yorkshire	A629 Blackley New Road; A629 Halifax Road; A629 Huddersfield Road; A643 Brighouse Road; A643 Lindley Moor Road	53°40′11″N 1°49′34″W	
The Air Balloon Roundabout	Roundabout	Birdlip, Gloucestershire	A417; A436	51°50′37″N 2°05′44″W	Named after the pub at the junction
Airman's Corner	Crossroads	Wiltshire	A360; A344; B3086	51°11′09″N 1°51′38″W	
Airport Roundabout	Roundabout	Weston-super-Mare, North Somerset	A370 Somerset Avenue; A370 Flowerdown Bridge; A371 Locking Moor Road; Moor Lane	51°20′41″N 2°55′55″W	Named after the airport which once existed nearby. The Helicopter Museum occupies part of the site with the rest being redeveloped for housing.
Aisecome Roundabout	Roundabout	Weston-super-Mare, North Somerset	Aisecome Way		
Alconbury Interchange	Grade Separated Fork	Alconbury, Huntingdonshire	A1(M); A604(M)	52°22′46″N 0°15′19″W	51°20′41.52″N 2°56′33.63″W
Alderney Roundabout	Roundabout	Alderney, Dorset	B3068 Ringwood Road (south) - towards Poole; A3049 Ringwood Road (north) - towards Bournemouth; A3049 Canford West (west) - towards Canford Heath	50.751090, -1.936086	Named after the Alderney suburb
Aldgate	Gyratory	Whitechapel, LB Tower Hamlets	A11 Whitechapel Road; A13 Commercial Road; A1211; A1202 Commercial Street	51°30′52″N 0°04′26″W	
Aller Bridge	Staggered	Coldridge, Devon	B3220	50.8453°N 3.8402°W	
Aller Cross	Crossroads	Cullompton, Devon		50.8510°N 3.3465°W	Named on fingerpost
Aller Cross aka Aller Down Cross	T junction	Sandford, Devon	Sandpit Lane	50.8280°N 3.6672°W	Both names on fingerpost
Allhallows Cross	T junction	Blackborough, Devon		50.8834°N 3.2871°W	Named on fingerpost
Almondsbury Interchange	Four Level Stack	Almondsbury, South Gloucestershire	M4 J20; M5 J15	51°33′09″N 2°33′08″W	
Alston Cross	Crossroads	Ashburton, Devon	A38; unclass.	SX776714	
Amen Corner	T junction	Tooting, LB Wandsworth	A217 Mitcham Road; B241 Rectory Lane; Southcroft Road	51°25′23″N 0°09′38″W	
Amwell Roundabout	Roundabout	Great Amwell, Hertfordshire	A414 Stanstead Abbotts Bypass Road; A414 Link Road; A1170 (formerly A10) Ware Road; A1170 (formerly A10) Pepper Hill; B1502 (formerly A414) Hertford Road; B181 (formerly A414) Station Road	51°47′12″N 0°00′54″W	Located at Great Amwell
Amy Tree	Crossroads	St Mellion Parish, Cornwall	Axford Hill; unclass.	SX364669	also the name of the nearby Down
Anchor Corner	Crossroads	Holton, Somerset, Somerset	Anchor Hill (formerly A303); A357; Lawrence Hill	ST697273	
The Angel, Edmonton	Diamond Interchange	Edmonton, LB Enfield	A406 Stirling Way; A406 Angel Road; A1010 Fore Street	51°36′53″N 0°03′52″W	
Angel	Crossroads	Islington, LB Islington	A1 Upper Street; A1 Goswell Road; A401 St John Street; A501 Pentonville Road	51°31′55″N 0°06′22″W	Named after the Inn on the Great North Road sited at the junction
Anniesland Cross	Crossroads	Anniesland, Glasgow	A82 Great Western Road; A739 Crow Road; A739 Bearsden Road; Anniesland Road	NS546688	
Animal Reception Centre Roundabout	Roundabout	Bedfont, LB Hounslow	Bedfont Road; Stanwell Road; Beacon Road	51°27′19″N 0°27′17″W	Named after the Animal Reception Centre nearby, adjacent to Heathrow Airport.
Apex Corner: aka Northway Circus	Roundabout	Mill Hill, LB Barnet	A1 Barnet Way; A1 Watford Way; A41 Watford Bypass; A5109 Selvage Lane	51°37′17″N 0°15′19″W	
Apleyhead Roundabout: aka Five Lanes End	Grade Separated Dumbbell Roundabout	Babworth, Nottinghamshire	A1 Worksop Road; A1 Blyth Road; A57; A614 Blyth Road; B6420 Mansfield Road	SK646782	A conversion from a roundabout to a grade separated dumbbell arrangement opened on 20 May 2008. The B6420 was routed north at this time to Apleyhead.
Apple Tree Roundabout	Roundabout	Yiewsley, LB Hillingdon	A408 Falling Lane; A408 West Drayton Road; Apple Tree Avenue; Chestnut Avenue	51°31′04″N 0°27′43″W	
Archway	Gyratory	Upper Holloway, LB Islington	A1 Holloway Road; A1 Archway Road; A400 Junction Road; B519 Highgate Hill; St John's Way	TQ294868	
Arkleston Interchange	Grade Separated Dumbbell Roundabout	Glasgow	M8 J27; A741 Paisley Road; A741 Renfrew Road	55°51′40″N 4°24′34″W	
Armley Gyratory	Gyratory	Leeds, West Yorkshire	A58 Wellington Road; A58 Gelderd Road; A647 Canal Street; B6154 Wellington Road	53°47′36″N 1°34′07″W	
Army and Navy	Roundabout Interchange with flyover	Chelmsford, Essex	A138 Chelmer Road; A1060 Parkway; A1114 Van Diemans Road (formerly A414); A1114 Essex Yeomanry Way; B1009 Baddow Road	51°43′38″N 0°28′54″E	Named after the pub which stood at the junction until 2007
Arnold Circus	Roundabout	Shoreditch, LB Tower Hamlets	B122 Calvert Avenue; B122 Club Row; Camlet Street	51°31′34″N 0°04′29″W	
Ash Cross	Crossroads	Bradninch, Devon	Bagmore Hill; Stoney Lane	50.8350°N 3.4222°W	
Ash Cross	Crossroads	Stoodleigh, Mid Devon	Wormsworthy Hill	50.9639°N 3.5500°W	Named on fingerpost
Ashcombe Roundabout	Roundabout	Lewes, East Sussex	A27; A277 Brighton Road; Ashcombe Hollow	TQ 42585 09188	
Ashland Roundabout	Roundabout	Ashland, Milton Keynes	H9 Groveway; V7 (B4034) Saxon Street	52°00′57″N 0°43′56″W	
Ashford Hospital Crossroads	Crossroads	Ashford, Surrey	A30 London Road; B378 Town Lane; B378 Stanwell Road	TQ061726	
Atco Crossroads	Crossroads	Eckington, Derbyshire	A6135 (former A616); B6052	SK434797	Named after an erstwhile branch of the mower company
Auchenkilns Roundabout	Grade Separated Dumbbell Roundabout	Cumbernauld, North Lanarkshire	A80; A73; B8048	NS742740	Upgraded in 2005 from an at grade roundabout to a grade separated dumbbell interchange
Avebury Roundabout	Roundabout	Central Milton Keynes	V6 Grafton Gate; Avebury Boulevard	52°02′04″N 0°46′06″W	
Awkley Interchange	Grade Separated Fork	Awkley, South Gloucestershire	M4 J21; M48	51°34′16″N 2°34′47″W	
Aycliffe Interchange	Roundabout Interchange	Aycliffe, Co. Durham	A1(M) J59; A167 Durham Road	54°35′02″N 1°33′40″W	
