= Desborough Mirror =

English historical artefact

The Desborough Mirror
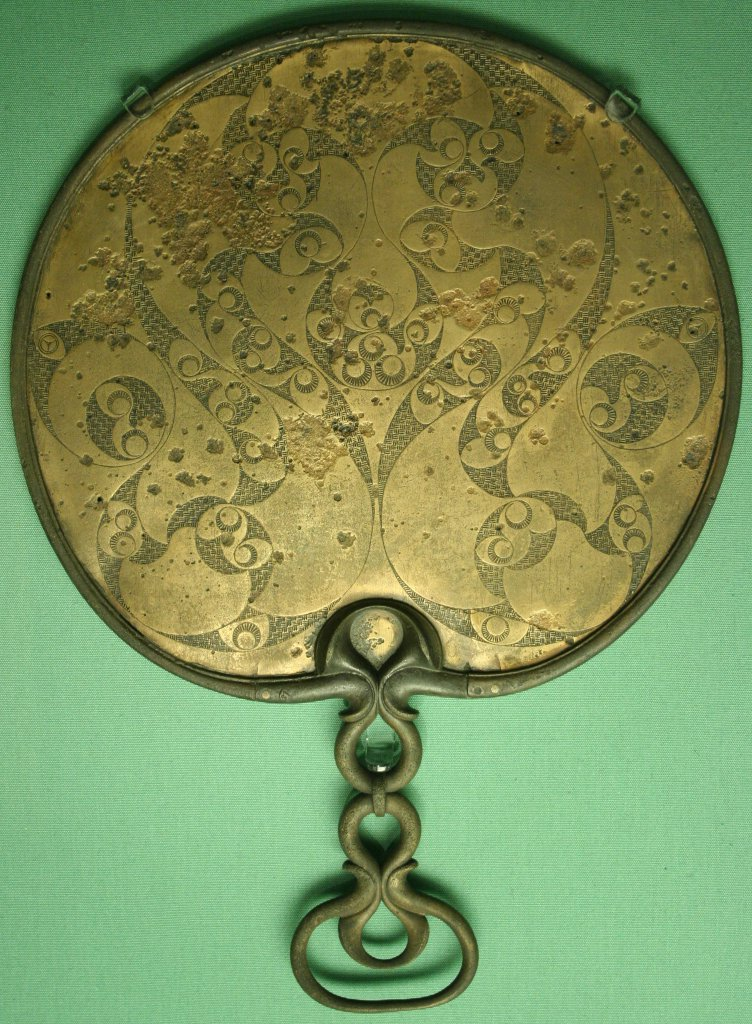
- The mirror's decorated reverse side
- Material: Bronze
- Size: Height: 35 cm (14 in); Width (max): 25.8 cm (10.2 in)
- Created: c. 50 BC–AD 50
- Discovered: 1908; Desborough, Northamptonshire, England; 52.4398°N 0.8172°W
- Discovered by: Workmen while excavating for ironstone
- Present location: British Museum, London
- Identification: 1924,0109

The Desborough Mirror is an intricately decorated English bronze mirror dated to c. 50 BC – 50 AD. It consists of a cast handle and a circular mirror plate, which is highly polished on its front side to achieve reflectivity. The plate's reverse is decorated with intricate engraved and chased curvilinear patterns in the La Tène style, and filled in with basket hatching.

The mirror was discovered in 1908 by workmen outside Desborough, Northamptonshire. Along with the Birdlip Mirror, it is widely considered to be the finest of the roughly 26 surviving, fully intact and decorated Iron Age bronze mirrors, the large majority of which are English. It was acquired by the British Museum in 1924, where it is displayed in room 50 (Britain and Europe 800 BC–AD 43).

== Discovery and dating ==
The Desborough Mirror was discovered in the mid-1908 by workers excavating ironstone from a site at the east end of Desborough, Northamptonshire, England. It was found in the same field as a near contemporary 2 in (51 mm) bronze brooch. However, the artefacts are unlikely to be from the same deposit (burial).

Decorated bronze mirrors of this type are specific to England; only a few continental examples are known. The majority have been found at graves dated to between 100 BC and 100 AD, indicating that, in contrast to many other Iron Age artefact types, they were not hidden or lost. Archaeologists and art historians generally agree that the Desborough Mirror dates from c. 50 BC–50 AD, based on the assumption that the quality of design and execution indicates that it was created during the "peak" of Iron Age mirror design.

The Desborough mirror, like that found at Birdlip, is in relatively good condition compared to other extant decorated examples, some of which may be reproductions given the disparity between their high-quality design and relatively poor-quality execution. There is light corrosion on around a quarter of the plates' surface and on portions of the tubular loop.

== Description ==
=== Handle and mirror plate ===
The mirror's cast handle consists of a looped-chain design, and is relatively simply designed compared to other extant contemporary examples.

The mirror plate is roughly circular and lined with a continuous tubular binding strip. The front side and handle contain green patination, while the reflection on the front side was realised through extensive polishing of the bronze surface. Previously, reflection was only experienced by looking into clear water. Thus, historians assume the mirrors were commissioned for high-status women.

=== Reverse plate ===
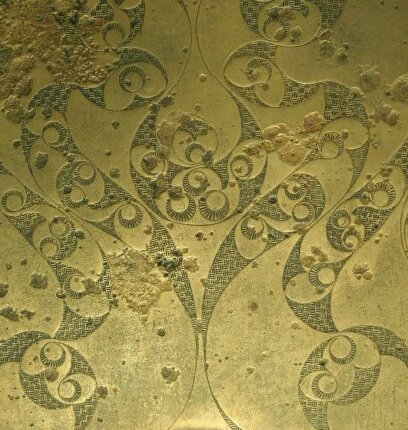
Detail of patterns on the lower part of the reverse.

The reverse side is decorated with intricate curvilinear Celtic designs in the "Insular La Tène" style, including engraved spirals, crescent shapes and "trumpet" (three-sided) patterns. In total, 224 individual patterns have been identified.

According to the archaeologist P.R. Lowery, the decoration of Celtic mirrors was a "delicate, intricate [process] and demanded considerable precisely directed force". Because designing such complex and minutely intricate patterns requires a different skill-set to engraving, the mirror's production was likely overseen by a master craftsman who oversaw the work of a series of workshop members; during the design phase, when the outlines were lightly inscribed onto the plate and during the final application. This application of very small patterns required significant technical precision and thus the final hatchings were most likely applied before the handle and tubing were attached, while the plate was held in a type of vice.

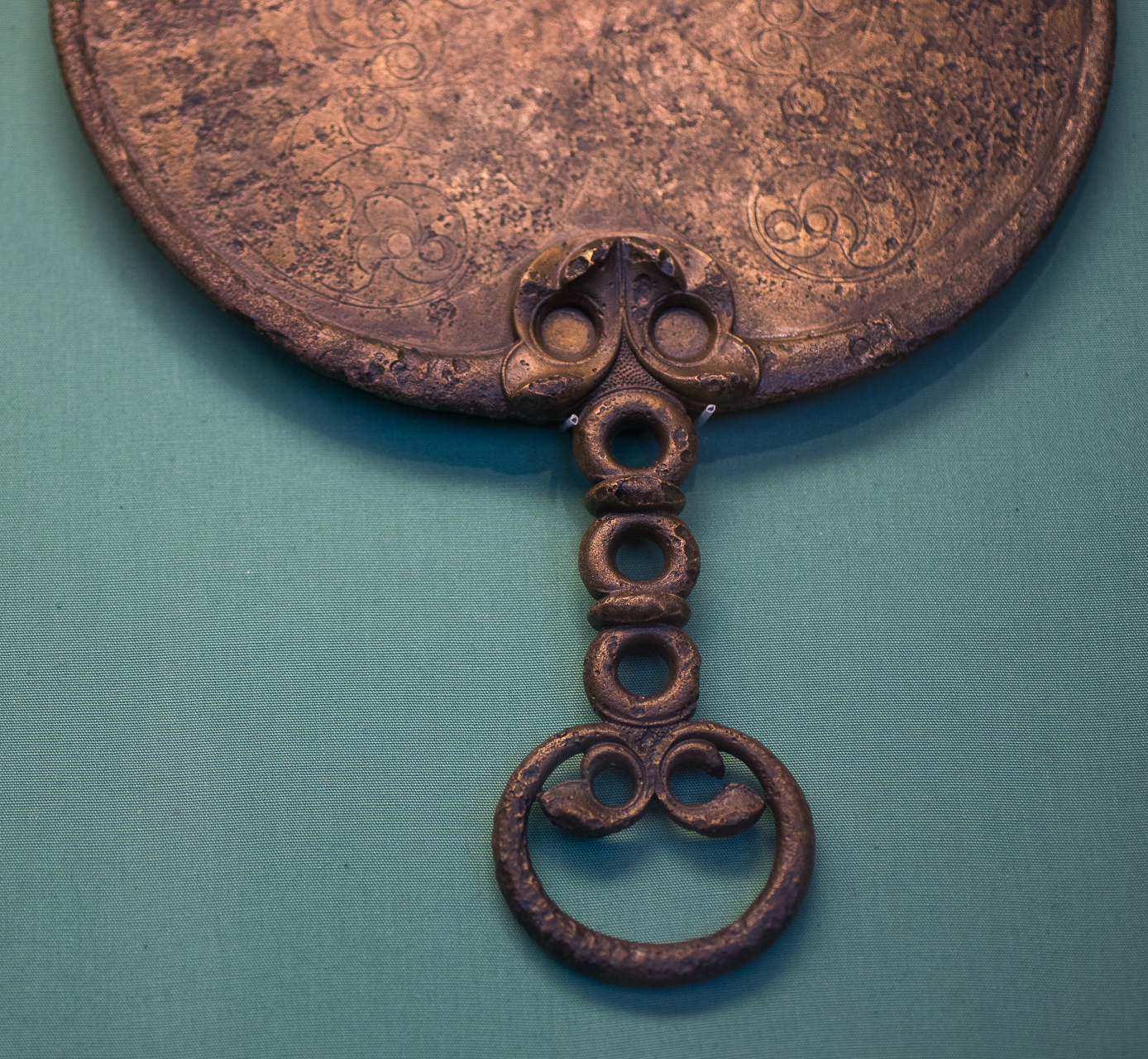
Detail of the chained handle and part of the front side of another mirror in the British Museum

The plate's broad outline appears to be that of a lyre (a stringed musical instrument similar to a lute) with flanking coils and was probably initially laid out using a scriber and compasses. The designs are symmetrically positioned, with those on one half reflecting opposite patterns on the other, but with the opposite shapes either "filled in" with darker shades (negative space) or empty with white space (positive space). Modern art historians generally agree that this inversion of positive and negative space was intended to invoke the way mirrors reverse the direction of any image at equal and opposite angles.

== Construction ==
A scriber and compasses would have been used to outline the 224 individual patterns before they were engraved by separate craftsmen.

== Sources ==
- Collingwood, Robin George; Myres, John Nowell. Roman Britain and English Settlements. NY: Biblo & Tannen, 1936. ISBN 0-8196-1160-3
- Joy, Jody. "Exploring status and identity in later Iron Age Britain: reinterpreting mirror burials". In: Moore, Tom; Armada, Xosé-Lois. Atlantic Europe in the First Millennium BC: Crossing the Divid. Oxford: Oxford University Press, 2011. ISBN 978-0-1995-6795-9
- Joy, Jody. "Reflections on Celtic Art: a re-examination of mirror decoration". In: Garrow, Duncan (ed). Rethinking Celtic Art. Oxford: Oxbow Books, 2008. ISBN 978-1-8421-7318-3
- Joy, Jody. Iron Age Mirrors: A Biographical Approach. Oxford: British Archeological Reports, 2000. ISBN 1-4073-0703-7
- Lowery, P.R.; Savage, R.D.A.; Wilkins, R.L. "A Technical Study of the Designs on the British Mirror Series". Proceedings of the Prehistoric Society, 1972. ISSN 0079-497X doi: doi:10.1017/S0079497X00007003
- Russell, Miles. "The girl with the chariot medallion: a well-furnished, Late Iron Age Durotrigian burial from Langton Herring, Dorset". Archaeological Journal, volume 176, issue 2, 2019. ISSN 0066-5983 doi:10.1080/00665983.2019.1573551
- Shirokova, Nadezhda. "The art of the British Celts. A critical review". Studia Antiqua et Archaeologica, volume 21, number 2, 2015. pp. 189–208.
- Smith, Reginald. "On a Late-Celtic Mirror found at Desborough, Northants, and other Mirrors of the Period". Archaeologia, volume 61, issue 2, 1909. ISSN 2051-3186 doi:10.1017/S0261340900010109
