= Basketweave =

General textile technique

Illustration of basketweave texture

Basketweave is a structure that exists in many textile arts. It consists of multiple horizontal strands and vertical strands, resulting in a square pattern associated with woven baskets.

It is used in the following textile arts:

- Basket weaving
- Basketweave in weaving
- Basketweave in knitting
- Basketweave in knot making
- Basketweave as a variant of tent stitch in needlepoint
- Basketweave in crochet

== See also ==
- Plain weave
- Seed/moss stitch
- Monk's cloth
