= List of road junctions in the United Kingdom: N =

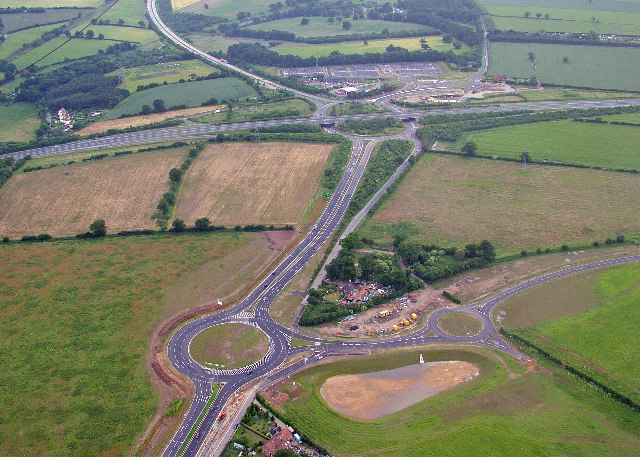
Thickthorn Interchange

This is part of the list of road junctions in the United Kingdom.

Many road junctions are named after pubs. For more information regarding the derivation of pub names see pub names.

== N ==
Junction Name	Type	Location	Roads	Grid Reference	Notes
Nags Head		Holloway, London Borough of Islington	A1 Holloway Road; A503 Parkhurst Road; A503 Seven Sisters Road	TQ304860	
Narkurs Cross	Crossroads	Narkurs, Cornwall	unclass.; unclass.	SX322561	
Neap House Junction		Scunthorpe, Lincolnshire	A1077; B1216 Ferry Road West	53°36′14″N 0°41′21″W	
Neasden Junction		Neasden, London Borough of Brent	A406 North Circular Road; A4088 Neasden Lane North; A4088 Dudden Hill; B453 Neasden Lane	51°33′35″N 0°15′12″W	
Neath Hill Roundabout		Neath Hill, Milton Keynes	H4 Dansteed Way; V9 Overstreet	52°03′30″N 0°44′42″W	
Netherfield Roundabout		Netherfield, Milton Keynes	H8 (A421) Standing Way; V8 Marlborough Street	52°01′31″N 0°43′47″W	
New Bradwell Roundabout		Bradville, Milton Keynes	Newport Road; V7 Saxon Street	52°04′04″N 0°46′39″W	
New Cross		New Cross, London Borough of Lewisham	A2 New Cross Road; A202 Queens Road	TQ358769	
New Cross Gate		New Cross, London Borough of Lewisham	A2 New Cross Road; A20 Amersham Road	TQ367771	
The New River Arms	Roundabout	Cheshunt, Hertfordshire	A10 Spur; A1170 (formerly A10); B176 High Road Turnford	51°43′30″N 0°01′40″W	Named after the pub at the junction (itself named after the New River, to take water to London), built in 1936 to take trade from the Great Cambridge Road
New Mill Crossroads		New Mill, West Yorkshire	A616 Huddersfield Road; A616 Sheffield Road; A635 Holmfirth Road; A635 Penistone Road	53°34′33″N 1°45′17″W	
Newbridge Roundabout	Roundabout Interchange	Newbridge, Edinburgh	M9 J1; A8 Glasgow Road; A89 Edinburgh Road; B7030 Newbridge Road	NT125727	
Newhouse Interchange		Newhouse, North Lanarkshire	M8 J6; A73 Bellside Road; A8	55°50′07″N 3°55′51″W	
Newington Green		Newington Green, LB Islington	A105 Newington Green Road; A105 Green Lanes; B104 Albion Road; Matthias Road	51°33′04″N 0°05′09″W	
Newlands Roundabout		Newlands, Milton Keynes	V10 Brickhill Street; Livingstone Drive	52°03′07″N 0°43′38″W	
Newlyn Cross Roads		Newlyn, Cornwall	A30; B3315 The CoombeO; unclass.	50.1099°N 5.5638°W	
Newton Bar		Newton, Lincolnshire	A52; unclass.	TF042371	
Newton's Corner		South Hornchurch, LB Havering	A1112 Dagenham Road; A125 Rainham Road	51°32′05″N 0°10′48″E	
Nine Mile Hill		Burwell, Cambridgeshire	A14 J36; A11; A1303 Newmarket Road	TL579601	
Nine Oaks Cross		Woodbury Salterton, Devon	A3052; B3184; unclass. Sanctuary Lane	50.7058°N 3.3803°W	
Noble Corner		Heston, London Borough of Hounslow	A4 Great West Road; A3063 Sutton Lane	TQ131767	
Norfolk Cross	Crossroads	Birmingham	A456 Hagley Road; B4129 Norfolk Road; B4129 Rotton Park Road	SP040860	
North Cross	Roundabout	Plymouth	unclass. North Road East, N; A374 Cobourg Street, SE; A374 Western Approach, SW; A386 Saltash Road, NW	50.3755°N 4.1426°W	
North Elder Roundabout		Central Milton Keynes	Silbury Boulevard; unclass.	52°02′12″N 0°46′30″W	
North Grafton Roundabout		Central Milton Keynes	H5 (A509) Portway; V6 Grafton Gate; V6 Grafton Street	52°02′24″N 0°46′29″W	
North Overgate Roundabout		Downhead Park, Milton Keynes	H5 (A509) Portway; V9 Overstreet; V9 Overgate	52°03′10″N 0°44′21″W	
North Saxon Roundabout		Central Milton Keynes	H5 (A509) Portway; V7 Saxon Street; V7 Saxon Gate	52°02′40″N 0°45′49″W	
North Secklow Roundabout		Central Milton Keynes	H5 (A509) Portway; V7 Saxon Street; V7 Saxon Gate	52°02′48″N 0°45′29″W	
North Skeldon Roundabout		Downs Barn, Milton Keynes	H5 (A509) Portway; Darley Gate; Skeldon Gate	52°03′03″N 0°44′45″W	
North Witan Roundabout		Central Milton Keynes	H5 (A509) Portway; Hampstead Gate; Witan Gate	52°02′32″N 0°46′07″W	
Northern Gateway Roundabout	Roundabout	Kingston upon Hull	A1033; unclass.	53°44′53″N 0°17′05″W	
Northfield Roundabout		Northfield, Milton Keynes	H5 (A509) Portway; A5130; H6 (A4146) Childs Way	52°03′16″N 0°42′09″W	
Northgate Circus: see Apex Corner
Northwood Hills Circus		Northwood, LB Hillingdon	A404 Pinner Road; B472 Joel Street	51°36′09″N 0°24′33″W	
Norton Roundabout		Norton, South Yorkshire	A6102 Bochum Parkway; B6057 Jordanthorpe Parkway; Norton Lane	53°19′50″N 1°27′47″W	
Nunney Catch		Nunney, Somerset	A359; A369; Green Pits Lane; unclass.	51°12′03″N 2°22′40″W	
Nuthall Island	Roundabout with Inner Slip Road	Nuthall, Nottinghamshire	A610; A6002 Low Wood Road; A6002 Woodhouse Way; B600 Nottingham Road; Nottingham Road	SK522440	There is a slip road in centre of island for traffic from A610 (Matlock) to A6002 (Beeston) and Nott'm Road, so that drivers can cut out the rather congested A610/A6002 junction.
Nymet Cross	T junction	Chenson, Chulmleigh, Devon	A377; unclass., to Nymet Rowland	50.86925°N 3.82755°W	Named on road sign
