= Stratton, Gloucestershire =

Coordinates: 51.731598°N 1.9769638°W

Stratton
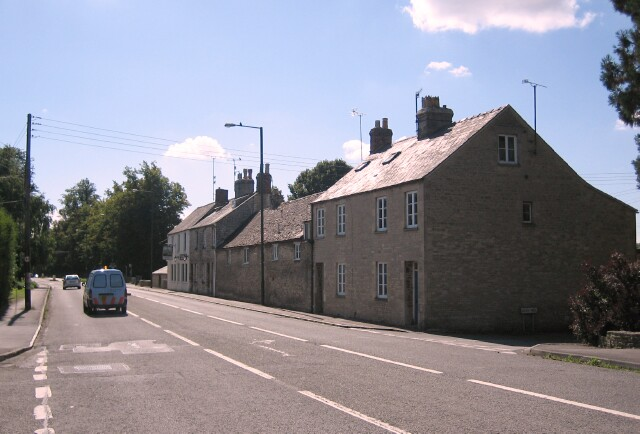

- Location within Gloucestershire
- Area: 0.800 km^{2} (0.309 sq mi)
- Population: 2,584 (2018 estimate)
  - Density: 3,230/km^{2} (8,400/sq mi)
- Civil parish: Cirencester
- District: Cotswold
- Shire county: Gloucestershire
- Region: South West
- Country: England
- Sovereign state: United Kingdom
- Police: Gloucestershire
- Fire: Gloucestershire
- Ambulance: South Western

Stratton is a village and ward in the civil parish of Cirencester, in the Cotswold district, in the county of Gloucestershire, England. It is about 22 miles from Gloucester. In 2018 the built up area and ward had an estimated population of 2584.

== Amenities ==
Stratton has a church called St Peter's on Daglingworth Road; Two pubs, The Plough Inn and The Drillman's Arms, both on Gloucester Road; a primary school on Thessaly Road a village hall on Thessaly Road; a hotel, Stratton House Hotel and Spa, on Gloucester Road and a post office at 17-19 Cheltenham Road.

== History ==
The name "Stratton" means 'Roman road farm/settlement'. Stratton is on the line of Ermine Street Roman road. Stratton was recorded in the Domesday Book as Stratune. In 1931 the parish had a population of 963. On 1 April 1935 the parish was abolished and merged with Cirencester, Baunton and Daglingworth.

Stratton was on the A417, construction of the Cirencester and Stratton bypass was due to be started in 1994 and was complete in December 1997.
