= Trumpet, Herefordshire =

Village in Herefordshire, England

Coordinates: 52.05281°N 2.50308°W

Trumpet
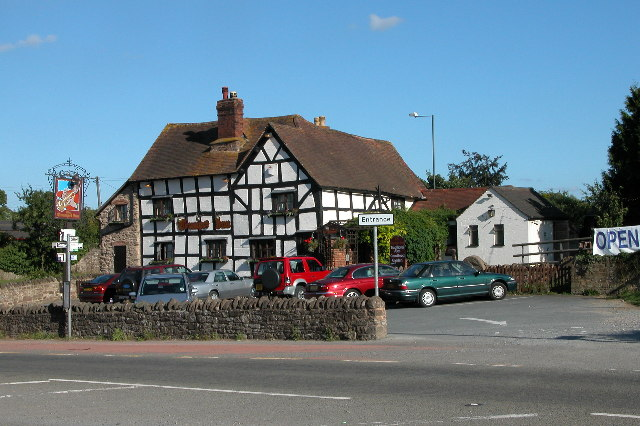
- The Trumpet Inn

- Location within Herefordshire
- Unitary authority: Herefordshire
- Shire county: Herefordshire
- Region: West Midlands
- Country: England
- Sovereign state: United Kingdom
- Post town: Ledbury
- Postcode district: HR8
- Police: West Mercia
- Fire: Hereford and Worcester
- Ambulance: West Midlands
- UK Parliament: North Herefordshire

Trumpet or The Trumpet is a hamlet in Herefordshire, England. The village is named after the timber-framed Trumpet Inn.

The inn is located at a major crossroads of the A438 and A417/A4172 from where:

- the City of Hereford is 18 km (11 mi) to the west on the A438
- Ledbury is 7 km (4.3 mi) to the east on the A438
- Leominster is 28 km (17 mi) to the northwest initially on the A417
- Gloucester is 32 km (20 mi) to the southeast initially on the A4172

The half-timbered inn is said to be some 800 years old and so named from the obligation of coaches that passed by to blow their coach horns.

The crossing must have been an important intersection of the Gloucester to Leominster and Tewkesbury to Hereford roads.

Local agriculture includes the growing of hops and cider apples.
