= Monk's cloth =

Loosely woven cotton or linen fabric made of coarser yarns

Monk's cloth is a loosely woven cotton or linen fabric made of coarser yarns that drape well.

== Basketweave ==
The monk's cloth was woven with basketweave, usually with 2×2 or 4×4. Basketweave is a plain weave, with the difference that it allows two or more filling yarn to pass over and under two or more warp yarns and forms a check pattern.

== Characteristics ==
This cloth has a loose over and under four strand weave. These strands are called floats and are used to weave the threads through. The cloth is 100% cotton and can be purchased in a variety of colors at craft and fabric stores. The cotton will shrink when washed, so should be pre-washed before so as to achieve the correct sizing before stitching.

== Use ==
In the 1940s monk's cloth was used to decorate borders on towels, throws, baby blankets, pillows, wall hanging, pictures, linens and clothing. Swedish dresses were decorated for traditional outfits with a variety of threads. Today, cotton floss and yarns are used on the fabric to create beautifully decorated items.

== See also ==
- Basketweave
