= The Air Balloon, Birdlip =

Pub in Birdlip, Gloucestershire, England

Coordinates: 51°50′36″N 02°05′48″W

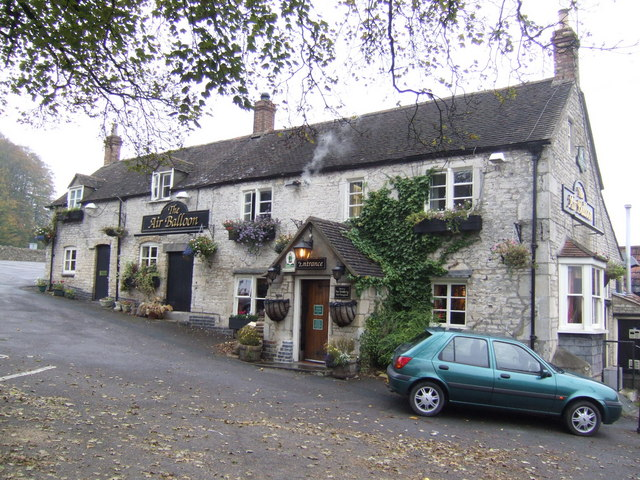
The pub in 2007

The Air Balloon is a road junction and former pub in Birdlip, Gloucestershire, England. The junction is on the A417 at a significant congestion point. The pub was open from the late 18th century to 2022, when it closed as part of road improvements, and was subsequently demolished.

== Location ==
The pub stood next to a roundabout junction on the A417, a major road between Swindon and Gloucester via Cirencester. The A436 meets the A417 at this point; the two roads together form a de facto bypass of Cheltenham between Oxford and Gloucester.

== History ==
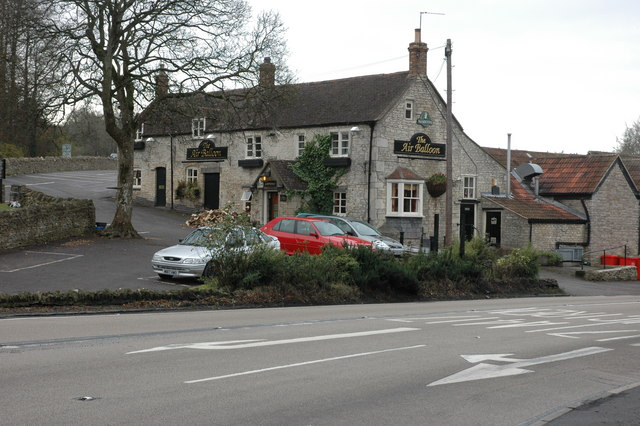
View of the pub from the A417

The pub opened in 1784 and was probably named after one of the first British balloon flights: the launching of a small hydrogen balloon by Edward Jenner on 2 September of that year, which flew from Berkeley Castle to Kingscote and then on to a field near Birdlip. This was the year after the pioneering flights of the Montgolfier brothers' hot air balloon and Jacques Charles's hydrogen balloon in Paris. It was known as the Balloon by 1796 and renamed the Air Balloon in 1802. By 1856, the landlord was brewing beer on-site. The premises were part of the Cowley Manor estate until some time early in the 20th century. The pub was bought by Greene King in 2004. In 2020 the menu included burgers, steaks, vegetarian food, "pub classics" and a lunchtime carvery.

== Closure ==
The pub was under threat of demolition as it sat alongside a short section of single-carriageway road which is otherwise a high-quality route between the M4 and M5 motorways. Although the junction has been said to be a notorious accident blackspot, from 1999 to 2014 there were an estimated 340 casualties along the whole section of road, which National Highways said was below average for the type of road.

In March 2019, Highways England proposed improvements that would include demolition of the pub, stating that the local geography and steep hills made it otherwise impossible to build a high-quality road meeting modern safety standards. The road could not be routed elsewhere as it would cut through Barrow Wake, which is a Site of Special Scientific Interest. Highways England stated that it would consult landowners and assess the social impact of the pub's demolition in a further design stage. As of June 2021, the pub was open, but was expected to be demolished. The landlord subsequently announced in December 2022 that the pub would close on New Year's Eve, and then it would be demolished.

Actor John Challis' widow said the couple used to visit the pub regularly, and she was sad to see it close. A spokesperson for Highways England expressed surprise at the pub's closure, saying it could have stayed open longer. There were additional concerns that a now-closed prominent landmark could become a magnet for vandalism. The premises were demolished in December 2023 as part of the construction work.
