= Charles Green (archaeologist) =

English archaeologist

- Charles Green c. 1965
- Born: 1901
- Died: 1972 (aged 70–71)
- Occupation: Archaeologist
- Known for: Work on the Sutton Hoo ship-burial and in East Anglia

Charles Green (1901–1972) was an English archaeologist noted for his excavations in East Anglia, and his work on the Sutton Hoo ship-burial. His "signal achievements" were his East Anglian excavations, including four years spent by Caister-on-Sea and Burgh Castle, and several weeks in 1961 as Director of excavations at Walsingham Priory. Green additionally brought his "long experience of boat-handling" to bear in writing his 1963 book, Sutton Hoo: The Excavation of a Royal Ship-Burial, a major work that combined a popular account of the Anglo-Saxon burial with Green's contributions about ship-construction and seafaring.

Green began his career in archaeology as an assistant at the Salford Royal Museum, and in 1932 was named curator of The Museum of Gloucester. Much of his East Anglian work was carried out in the 1950s and 1960s on behalf of the Ministry of Works. Green was also a member of the National Executive of the Council for British Archaeology, a one time President of the Norfolk Research Committee, and, at his death, the President of the Great Yarmouth Archaeological Society and vice-president of the Norfolk and Norwich Archaeological Society.

== Career ==
Charles Green was born in Lancaster, England, in 1901. He began his archaeological career as an assistant at the Royal Museum in Salford, Greater Manchester, and in 1932 he was appointed curator of The Museum of Gloucester. There, he studied the prehistory of Gloucestershire, undertaking a study of Roman Gloucester and publishing several papers, including an important 1949 note on the burials found in Birdlip. The Royal Air Force took Green under its wing during World War II; he served in the photographic and intelligence branches, befitting his archaeological interest in air photography.

During the 1950s, Green carried out many excavations for the Ministry of Works, difficult work for an understaffed department. In 1951, he arrived in East Anglia, which would become the site of his "signal achievements", to excavate the Roman town at Caister-on-Sea, close to Great Yarmouth and across from Burgh Castle. Green spent four years continuously excavating there, from the summer of 1951 to January 1955, chronicling the rise and fall of the town. This work gave him experience with the fluctuations of the North Sea, leading to his contribution to the 1960 book The Making of the Broads. From 1958 to 1960, also for the Ministry of Works, Green excavated a nearly plough-destroyed barrow cemetery in Shrewton, a village near Stonehenge. This led to a paper read to the Prehistoric Society in 1960, and a posthumous publication in 1984.

Green continued excavations in East Anglia in the 1960s, including several weeks spent at Walsingham Priory; an article on the excavations was published in 1968. In this decade he also published at least four papers in Norfolk Archaeology. He was credited with "a far-seeing interdisciplinary approach" for "A Human Skull from Runham, Norfolk" (1961) and "Broadland Fords and Causeways" (1961), "historical topography" in "The Lost Vill of Ness" (1969), and "emergent industrial archaeological considerations" for the "entrancing" "Herring-Nets and Beatsters" (1969).

=== Sutton Hoo ===
In 1963 Green published Sutton Hoo: The Excavation of a Royal Ship-Burial. It is considered a major work about the Sutton Hoo ship-burial, a high-status grave from the seventh century. The book benefited from Green's considerable experience in boat-handling along Western Ireland and the entirety of the North Sea, giving him a realistic perspective on the capabilities of Anglo-Saxon ships, and was said to reflect "adventurous, though scientific, sea-faring".

Sutton Hoo: The Excavation of a Royal Ship-Burial was reviewed as a popular account of the excavation, offering "a convenient peg on which to hang the more original chapters of the book". The first half of the work retold the story, published elsewhere and in more detail, of the burial; as the archaeologist Brian Hope-Taylor noted, "it is as though the British Museum's Provisional Guide, which most of us have known since it was so-thick, has suddenly filled out on reaching its middle teens". Green "claim[ed] no originality for these chapters of his book"; according to another reviewer, "[t]here is no originality in his conclusions that the burial took place in the third quarter of the seventh century, and that the person it commemorates was a prominent member, indeed almost certainly a king, of the East Anglian royal family."

Green's original contribution came in the second half of the book, where he discussed ship-construction from the fall of the Roman Empire to the Viking Age, and the problems of navigating the North Sea in keelless boats such as the Sutton Hoo ship. He concluded that the Sutton Hoo ship was not as well constructed as were later Viking ships, could not have supported a sail, and could not have safely withstood open sailing in the North Sea. Travel from East Anglia to Schleswig, near modern-day Denmark, would have required hugging the coastline, he suggested, resulting in a trip that could have taken up to two months.

Green revisited the topic of sea-travel in his later years. Shortly before his 1972 death, he had been undertaking a work on early sea-travel, especially the raids along the coasts of Roman Britain made by the Picts in their curraghs.

=== Organizations ===
Green was made a member of the Norfolk and Norwich Naturalists' Society in 1953. Starting in 1964, he was the vice-president of the Norfolk and Norwich Archaeological Society. He was formerly the President of the Norfolk Research Committee, and President of the Great Yarmouth Archaeological Society; he was also an early member of the National Executive of the Council for British Archaeology, helping guide it in its early years.

== Personal life ==
Green had a daughter, Barbara Green. She was also an archaeologist, and served as keeper of archaeology at Norwich Castle from 1963 until 1992. Charles Green was living in Ormesby St Margaret in Norfolk in 1971, and died the following year.

== Publications ==
- Green, Charles (1949). "The Birdlip Early Iron Age Burials: A Review". Proceedings of the Prehistoric Society. XV. The Prehistoric Society: 188–190. doi:10.1017/S0079497X00019289.
- Green, Charles (2 February 1952). "Excavations at Roman Port in East Anglia". The Times. No. 52, 225. London. p. 7.
- Green, Charles; Larwood, Gilbert Powell & Martin, A. J. (1953). "The Coastline of Flegg". Transactions of the Norfolk and Norwich Naturalists' Society. XVII (V). The Norfolk and Norwich Naturalists' Society: 327–342.
- Green, Charles & Hutchinson, John Neville (1960). "Archaeological Evidence". In Oddy, William Andrew (ed.). The Making of the Broads: A Reconsideration of Their Origin in the Light of New Evidence. Royal Geographical Society Research Series. Vol. 3. London: John Murray Ltd. pp. 113–146.
- Green, Charles & Wells, Calvin (1961). "A Human Skull from Runham, Norfolk" (PDF). Norfolk Archaeology. XXXII (IV). Norwich: Norfolk and Norwich Archæological Society: 311–315.
- Green, Charles (1961). "Broadland Fords and Causeways" (PDF). Norfolk Archaeology. XXXII (IV). Norwich: Norfolk and Norwich Archæological Society: 316–331.
- Green, Charles & Hutchinson, John Neville (March 1961). "Relative Land and Sea Levels at Great Yarmouth, Norfolk". The Geographical Journal. 131 (1). London: The Royal Geographical Society: 86–90. doi:10.2307/1793705. JSTOR 1793705.
- Green, Charles (1963). Sutton Hoo: The Excavation of a Royal Ship-Burial. New York: Barnes & Noble.
- Green, Charles (1964). "Becket's Chapel, Norwich" (PDF). Norfolk Archaeology. XXXIII (III). Norwich: Norfolk and Norwich Archæological Society: 298–309.
- Green, Charles (March 1965). "East Anglian Coast-line Levels Since Roman Times". Antiquity. XXXV (137): 21–28. doi:10.1017/S0003598X00035778.
- Green, Charles (1966). "The Lost Vill of Ness" (PDF). Norfolk Archaeology. XXXIV (I). Norwich: Norfolk and Norwich Archæological Society: 2–8.
- Green, Charles (1967). "The Urnes Style in East Anglia" (PDF). Norfolk Archaeology. XXXIV (II). Norwich: Norfolk and Norwich Archæological Society: 240–242.
- Green, Charles & Whittingham, Arthur Bensly (1968). "Excavations at Walsingham Priory, Norfolk, 1961". The Archaeological Journal. CXXV. London: Royal Archaeological Institute: 255–290. doi:10.1080/00665983.1968.11078341.
- Green, Charles (1969). "Herring-Nets and Beatsters: An Essay in Industrial Archaeology" (PDF). Norfolk Archaeology. XXXIV (IV). Norwich: Norfolk and Norwich Archæological Society: 419–428.
- Green, Charles (1970). "Excavation on the Town Wall, Great Yarmouth, Norfolk, 1955" (PDF). Norfolk Archaeology. XXXV (I). Norwich: Norfolk and Norwich Archæological Society: 109–117.
- Green, Charles & Wells, Calvin (1973). "Sunrise Dating of Death and Burial" (PDF). Norfolk Archaeology. XXXV (IV). Norwich: Norfolk and Norwich Archæological Society: 435–442.
- Clough, Timothy Hatton McKenzie & Green, Charles (1978). "The First Late Bronze Age Founder's Hoard from Gorleston, Great Yarmouth, Norfolk" (PDF). Norfolk Archaeology. XXXVII (I). Norwich: Norfolk and Norwich Archæological Society: 1–18.
- Green, Charles; Rollo-Smith, Stephen; Crowfoot, Elisabeth & Wells, Calvin (December 1984). "The Excavation of Eighteen Round Barrows near Shrewton, Wiltshire". Proceedings of the Prehistoric Society. 50. The Prehistoric Society: 255–318. doi:10.1017/S0079497X00007556.

== Bibliography ==
- A., P. (1973). "Charles Green 1901–1972" (PDF). Norfolk Archaeology. XXXV (IV). Norfolk and Norwich Archaeological Society: 515–516.

- Also published online with photograph.

- Agutter, Doreen M. K. (2011). "Archaeology at Walsingham Priory 1853–1961". The Walsingham Archives.
- Darling, Margaret J. & Gurney, David (1993). Caister-on-Sea: Excavations by Charles Green, 1951–1955 (PDF). East Anglian Archaeology. Vol. 60. Dereham, Norfolk: Field Archaeological Division, Norfolk Museums Service. ISSN 0307-2460. Archived from the original (PDF) on 31 January 2026.
- Fisher, Douglas John Vivian (1964). "Review: Sutton Hoo: The Excavation of a Royal Ship-Burial". History. 49 (167). The Historical Association: 337–338. JSTOR 24404435.
- Glass, Sandra A. (December 1965). "Review: Sutton Hoo: The Excavation of a Royal Ship-Burial". Archaeology. 18 (4). Archaeological Institute of America: 302, 304. JSTOR 41667571.
- Griffin, James B. (December 1964). "Review: Sutton Hoo: The Excavation of a Royal Ship-Burial". American Anthropologist. 66 (6). American Anthropological Association: 1443–1444. doi:10.1525/aa.1964.66.6.02a00550. JSTOR 668039.
- Hope-Taylor, Brian (March 1964). "Review: Sutton Hoo: The Excavation of a Royal Ship-Burial". Antiquity. XXXVIII (149). Antiquity Publications Ltd.: 67–68. doi:10.1017/S0003598X00068824.
- Johnson, Stephen (1983). Burgh Castle: Excavations by Charles Green 1958–61 (PDF). East Anglian Archaeology. Vol. 20. Dereham, Norfolk: Norfolk Archaeological Unit, Norfolk Museums Service. ISBN 0-905594-07-X.
- Knights, Emma (12 February 2018). "Tributes to a True Champion of Archaeology in Norfolk". Eastern Daily Press.
- Myres, John Nowell Linton (July 1965). "Review: Sutton Hoo: The Excavation of a Royal Ship-Burial". The English Historical Review. LXXX (316). Oxford University Press: 572–573. JSTOR 561915.
- Strayer, Joseph R. (March 1964). "Review: Sutton Hoo: The Excavation of a Royal Ship-Burial". American Scientist. 52 (1). Society of the Sigma XI: 120A–121A. JSTOR 27838975.
- Taylor Page, F. J. (1953). "Secretary's Report, 1952–1953". Transactions of the Norfolk and Norwich Naturalists' Society. XVII (V). The Norfolk and Norwich Naturalists' Society: 301–303.
- "Two Anglo-Saxon Graves: "Pseudo" Ship Burials". The Manchester Guardian. No. 33, 641. London. 23 August 1954. p. 10 – via Newspapers.com.
