= A417 road =

Major road in England

A417

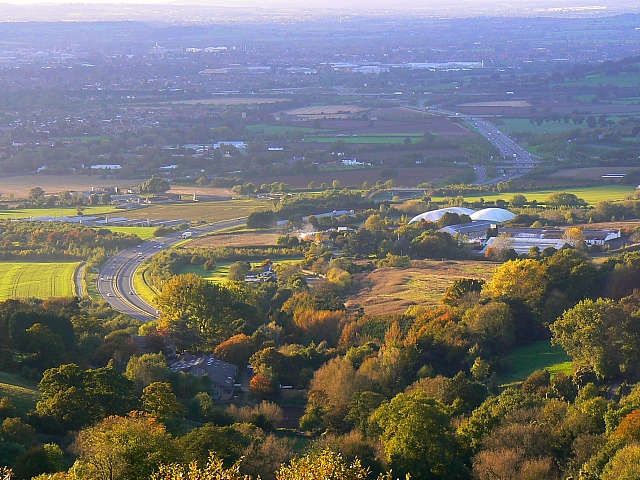
- The A417 Brockworth bypass with Gloucester in the distance

Route information
- Length: 96.9 mi (155.9 km)

Major junctions
- Southeast end: Streatley, Berkshire; 51.5253°N 1.1493°W
- M5 M50 A329 A338 A419 A420 A361 A429 A435 A436; A46; A38; A40 A449 A438 A4103 A465; A49
- Northwest end: Hope under Dinmore; 52.1738°N 2.7153°W

Location
- Country: United Kingdom
- Primary destinations: Cirencester; Gloucester; Wantage

Road network
- Roads in the United Kingdom; Motorways; A and B road zones
| ← A416 | → A418 |

The A417 is a main road in England, running from Streatley, Berkshire to Hope under Dinmore, Herefordshire. It is best known for its section between Cirencester and Gloucester where it has primary status and forms part of the link between the major settlements of Swindon and Gloucester.

== History ==
When the A417 was first designated in 1922, it ran only from Streatley to Cirencester. In 1935 it was extended to Gloucester, on the former route of the A419, and on to Ledbury and Hope under Dinmore.

There have been numerous upgrades and bypasses, particularly on the primary section. At Faringdon, its traditional route over Folly Hill and down through the market place has been blocked by the more recent development of the A420 and the road has been diverted to the south. The Birdlip bypass, opened in 1988, avoided a steep (16%) gradient as the road descended the Cotswold Edge escarpment to Brockworth.

On 31 December 2022, the 200-year old Air Balloon pub at the roadside near Birdlip closed for the final time, before demolition to allow the road to be upgraded.

=== Brockworth bypass ===
Southeast of Gloucester, the A417 originally followed a stretch of Roman road through the rural parish of Brockworth. A factory was built here by the Gloster Aircraft Company, followed by other industries and housing. A draft route was published at the end of January 1991 to bypass Brockworth to the north, with work costing £35m to start in 1993. A three-week public inquiry took place in early November 1991. There were protestors, who offered three alternative routes.

Esso and Granada wanted to build a service area on the new bypass, at the bottom of Crickley Hill. In December 1991 Tewkesbury Borough Council rejected the proposal as it would interfere with the Cotswolds AONB. The 3-mile (5 km) bypass was given the go-ahead in December 1992, with a new free-flow junction 11A on the M5 motorway.

The £34m contract was given to George Wimpey in December 1993, with the bypass to be completed by the end of 1995. Frank Graham were the consulting engineers. The bypass was opened by John Watts on 18 December 1995. The new M5 junction was partly opened at the same time, being fully opened on 4 March 1996.

=== Birdlip bypass ===
In October 1986, the government decided to build a £1.5m bypass to avoid Birdlip village, a few miles east of Brockworth. The bypass would be 1.7 miles (2.7 km) long; work was to start in early 1988 and be completed by 1990. Biwater Construction were given the £1.9m contract in January 1988, to take 18 months. Work started in late February 1988, to be finished by January 1989.

The bypass opened on 12 December 1988, eight months early. The official opening was on 12 April 1989.

== Route ==
=== Streatley to Gloucester (M5) ===
The road runs north-west from Streatley at its junction with the A329 (between Reading and Wallingford) then turns west to Wantage, over the picturesque Berkshire Downs. In Wantage, it negotiates the market place (around King Alfred's statue). Soon after leaving Wantage it passes through East Challow village and runs north-west to Faringdon, via Stanford in the Vale. It leads on to Lechlade, where it crosses the River Thames at St John's Bridge. It then runs past the Cotswold Water Park, through the bottleneck of Fairford to Cirencester, and thence to Gloucester.

The 2-mile (3.2 km) £2.4m single-carriageway Birdlip bypass opened in December 1988. This point, before the Air Balloon roundabout, has a grand vista of the Severn Valley. After the roundabout and the (now demolished) Air Balloon pub, the road turns sharply and there is a steep downward gradient. This is a bottleneck at peak times, and plans for a dual-carriageway section here were included in a roads expansion programme pledged during the government's 2014 Autumn Statement for delivery during the following 5–8 years.

From the start of the Cirencester bypass as far as Gloucester, the A417 forms part of a dual-carriageway route (A419/A417) connecting the M4 (junction 15) with the M5 at Gloucester (junction 11A). At the A429 roundabout on the older Cirencester bypass, the A417 follows the A429 north for 0.5 miles (0.8 km), then resumes when it joins the newer bypass (which is also the A417). The 6-mile (9.7 km) Cirencester & Stratton Bypass opened on 9 December 1997. This route carries traffic between the ports of the south coast and the industrial Midlands. The 4-mile (6.4 km) dual-carriageway north of Stratton to Nettleton opened on 16 January 1998. The roundabout at the end of this section often has congestion during peak hours.

Construction work to complete the 'missing link' between the end of the Brockworth Bypass and Cowley Roundabout began in 2023, with an expected completion date of Spring 2027. At the foot of the hill, the 3-mile (4.8 km) £36m Brockworth Bypass opened in December 1995, and included creation of junction 11a of the M5.

=== Gloucester (M5) to Hope under Dinmore ===
Through Gloucester, the road overlaps the A40 Gloucester northern bypass, and from a roundabout at the end of the bypass the road goes north-west through the village of Maisemore, past Hartpury College, then through the village of Hartpury. The A417 then passes through the twin villages of Corse and Staunton. It crosses the M50 Ross Spur motorway at junction 2, then meets the Ledbury bypass, where the road noticeably widens out, and has many large roundabouts. Between Gloucester and Ledbury there are many changes of speed limit. From Ledbury it goes west, overlapping the A438, then at a set of traffic lights known as the Trumpet crossroads, the A417 goes north-west along a more high-hedged, narrow road. It meets the A49 at a wide junction at Hope under Dinmore just south of Leominster.

== Junctions ==
A417 (T)
| Northbound exits | Junction | Southbound exits |
| Ross A40, Ledbury (A417), Chepstow (A48); Cheltenham A40, Tewkesbury, Bristol (M5) | Elm Bridge Court | Start of A417 (T) |
| Gloucester (A38) | Corinium Avenue Roundabout | Gloucester (A38) |
| Local routes | Zoons Court Roundabout | Local routes |
| The Midlands M5 | M5 J11A | No exit or access |
| The South West Bristol (M5), Gloucester Business Park; Exit only | M5 J11A | The SOUTH WEST Bristol (M5) |
| Cheltenham, Stroud A46 | Primrose Vale | Cheltenham, Stroud A46 |
| Stow on the Wold A436, Oxford (A40), Cheltenham (East) (A435) | Air Balloon Roundabout | Stow on the Wold A436, Oxford (A40) |
| Cowley, Caudle Green, Brimpsfield | Cowley Roundabout | Cowley, Caudle Green, Brimpsfield |
| Syde, Winstone, Elkstone | Winstone Junction | Syde, Winstone, Elkstone |
| Daglingworth, Bagendon, Perrott's Brook | Daglingworth Junction | Stratton, Daglingworth, Bagendon, Perrott's Brook |
| Cirencester, Stow A429, Burford (B4425) | Cirencester North Interchange | Cirencester, Stow A429, Lechdale (A417) |
| Start of A417 (T) | Cirencester South Interchange | Access only |
| Cirencester Industrial Area, Stroud A419; Exit only | Cirencester South Interchange | Road becomes A419 (T) to Swindon |
1.000 mi = 1.609 km; 1.000 km = 0.621 mi: Incomplete access

== See also ==
- British road numbering scheme
