= Daglingworth =

Village in Gloucestershire, England

Coordinates: 51°45′N 2°01′W

- Village
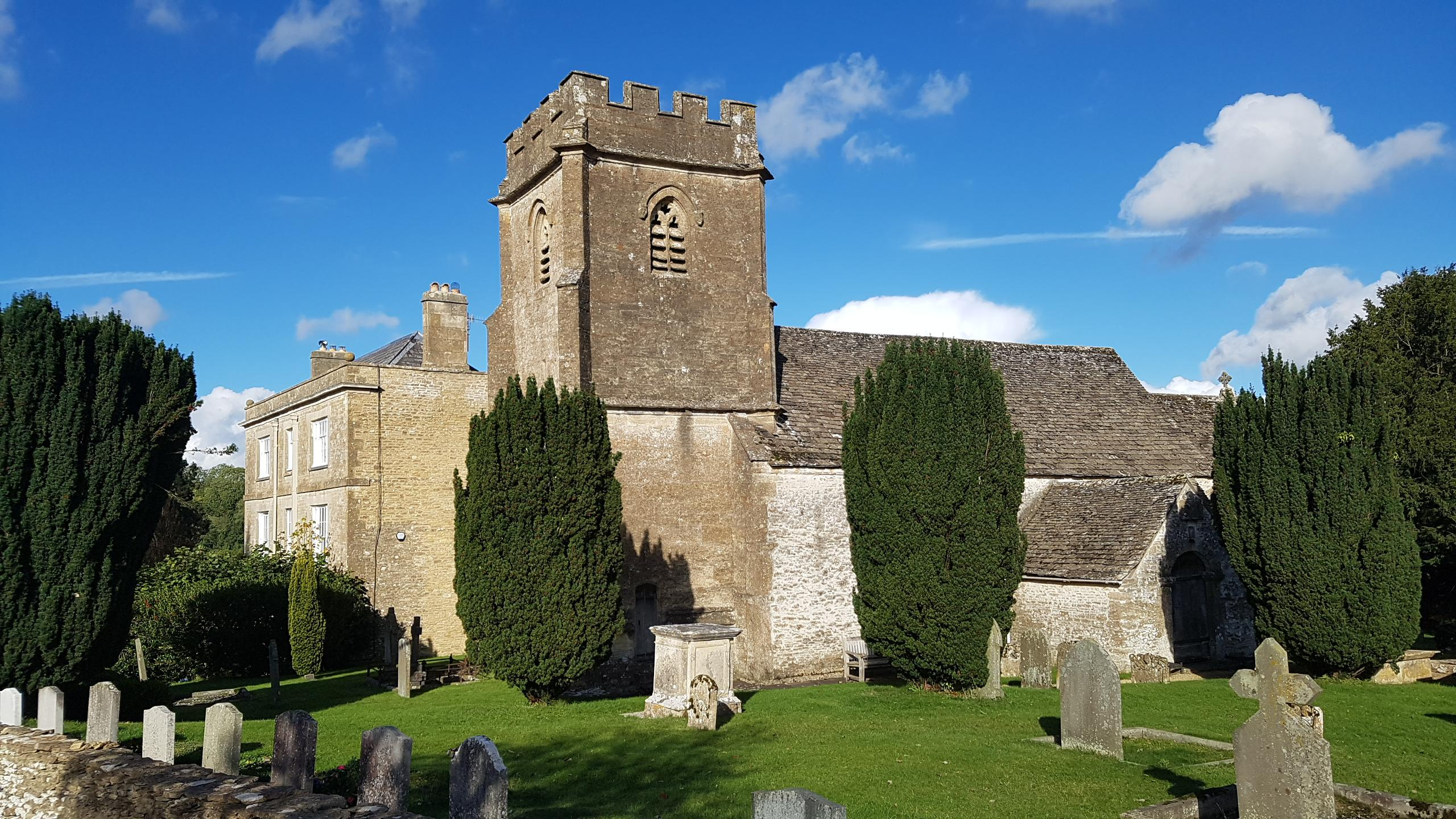
- Daglingworth Church of the Holy Rood

- Location within Gloucestershire
- Population: 265 (2011 Census)
- District: Cotswold
- Shire county: Gloucestershire
- Region: South West
- Country: England
- Sovereign state: United Kingdom
- Post town: Cirencester
- Postcode district: GL7
- Police: Gloucestershire
- Fire: Gloucestershire
- Ambulance: South Western
- UK Parliament: North Cotswolds

Daglingworth is a Gloucestershire village in the valley of the River Dunt, near the A417 road connecting Gloucester and Cirencester. As with many smaller villages in the Cotswolds, most of the buildings are now private houses. Other properties are the church, the village hall, a stable and horse riding centre and Bridge Farm.

The Church of the Holy Rood in the village is an Anglo-Saxon church with well-preserved stone carvings, including an Anglo-Saxon crucifixion tablet dating to 1015. There is also a canonical sundial on the south wall.

The population taken at the 2011 census was 265. The small hamlet of Itlay lies approximately a quarter of a mile north of Daglingworth.

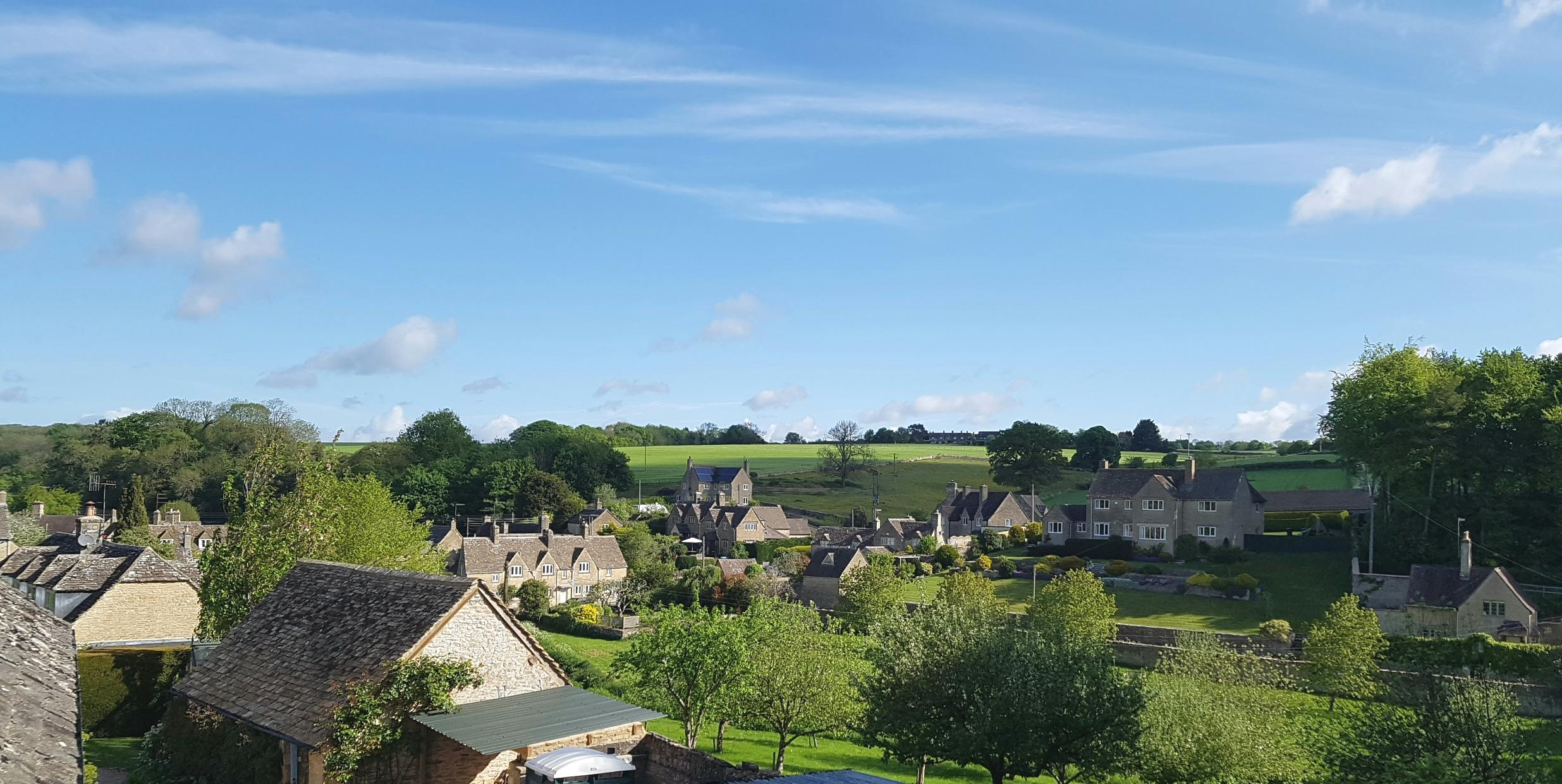

== Toponymy ==
The name Daglingworth dates back to 1150. As Worth is the old English word for enclosure, the literal translation would be "enclosure of the family or adherents of Dæggel or Dæccel".

== History ==
In the late 19th century, George Witts made reference to Daglingworth Roman Villa:

About the year 1690 the foundations of a Roman villa were discovered in the parish of Daglingworth, close to the Ermine Street, two and a half miles north-west of Cirencester. It was situated in a field called "Cave Close."

There is a Roman votive tablet in the vestry wall of the church, and two pieces of carved stone found in Daglingworth representing Genii Cucullati, a hooded sect of the Romano-British period, are now in the Corinium Museum.

The first mention of a church in the village is in 1177 when Ralf Bluet, lord of the manor, conveyed it to the nuns of Godstow. In 1212 the abbess appointed John de Gundeville to serve the church as parish priest.

Historically the village had three schools, all of which are now private houses. Daglingworth Manor School closed in the 1970s. Daglingworth primary school closed in 1986. There was also a small nursery school.
