= Barrow Wake =

Scenic location in England

Coordinates: 51.83°N 02.11°W

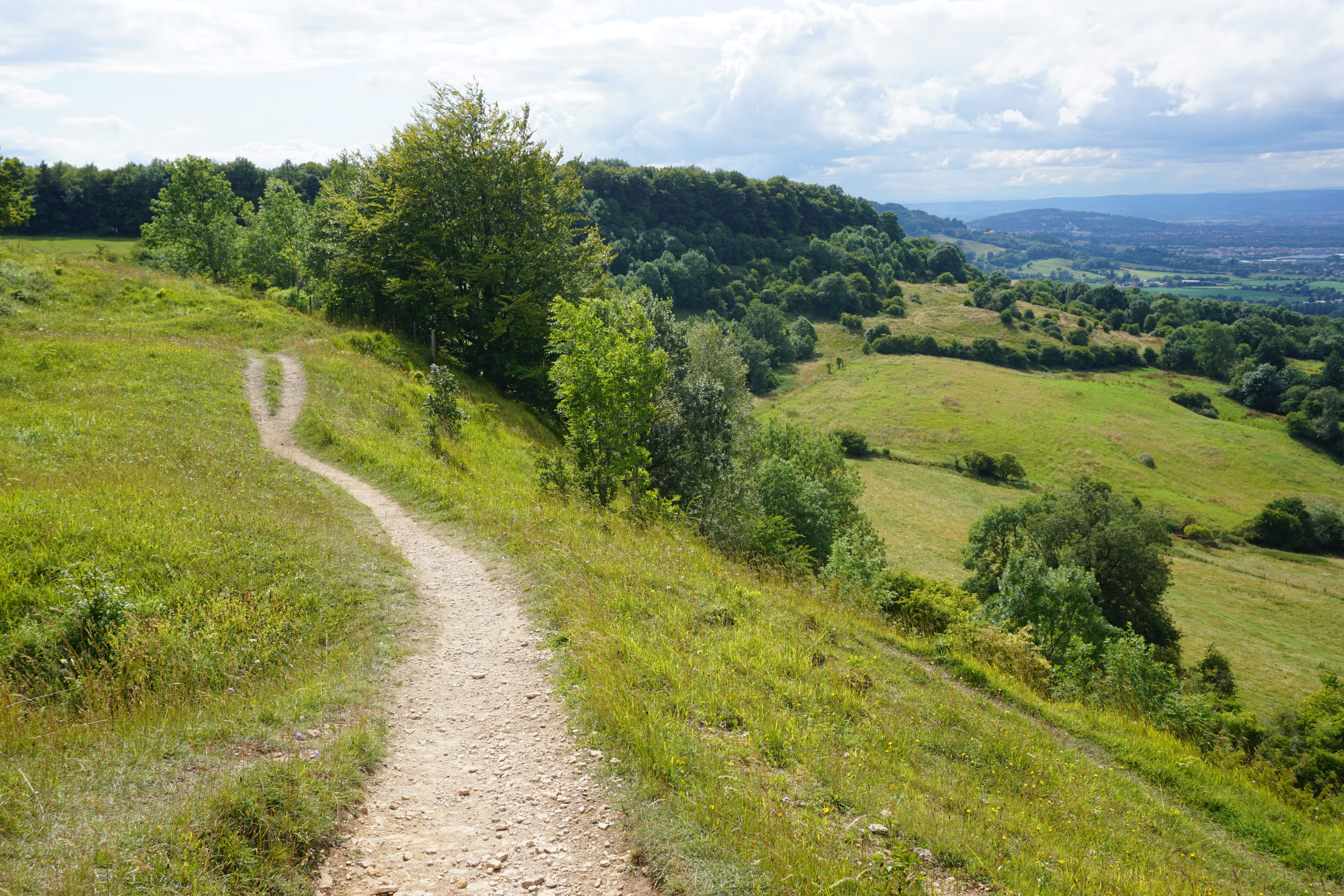
- The Cotswold Way at Barrow Wake

- Location within Gloucestershire
- OS grid reference: SO9215
- Shire county: Gloucestershire
- Region: South West
- Country: England
- Sovereign state: United Kingdom
- Police: Gloucestershire
- Fire: Gloucestershire
- Ambulance: South Western

Barrow Wake is a scenic view in Gloucestershire, near Birdlip, England.

Barrow Wake was used as the location for the music video "Wytches" by Pagan Rock Band Inkubus Sukkubus in December 1993.

Inkubus Sukkubus also released an album titled "Barrow Wake - Tales of Witchcraft & Wonder Volume 1", The Album features the title track "Barrow Wake", which is written about Barrow Wake.
