= Birdlip =

Village and civil parish in Gloucestershire, England

Coordinates: 51°49′40″N 02°06′32″W

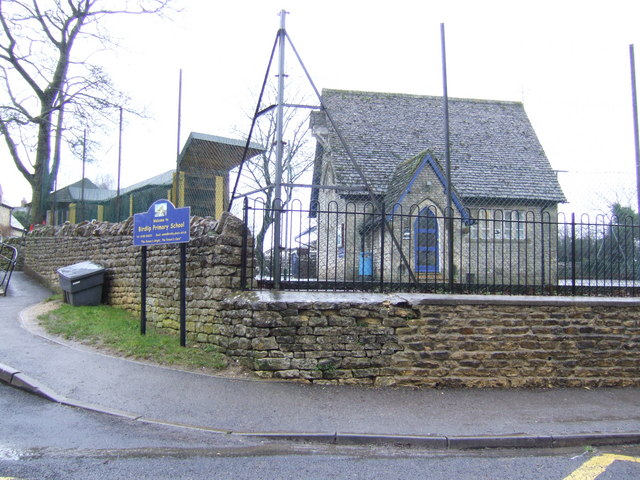
- Birdlip Primary School

- Location within Gloucestershire
- OS grid reference: SO9214
- Civil parish: Birdlip
- District: Cotswold
- Shire county: Gloucestershire
- Ceremonial county: Gloucestershire
- Region: South West
- Country: England
- Sovereign state: United Kingdom
- Post town: Gloucester
- Postcode district: GL4
- Dialling code: 01452
- Police: Gloucestershire
- Fire: Gloucestershire
- Ambulance: South Western
- UK Parliament: North Cotswolds
- Website: Birdlip Parish Council

Birdlip is a village and civil parish, in the Cotswold district, in the county of Gloucestershire, England. It is in the Cotswolds Area of Outstanding Natural Beauty 6 miles (9.7 km) south of Cheltenham and 8 miles (13 km) south east of Gloucester.

== History ==
Some fine pre-Roman bronze art, including the famous Birdlip Mirror, from around AD 50, was found at Barrow Wake near Birdlip.

The village was once on the main road between Gloucester and Cirencester, now the A417. The building of a bypass, which opened in December 1988, moved the main route away from the village.

Black Horse Ridge is a 17th-century building that until 1900 was a public house. A lodge adjacent to Black Horse Ridge was designed by Richard Pace and built in 1822. Birdlip's remaining pub is The Royal George Hotel, which was built in the 19th century.

Birdlip House is a Georgian house built late in the 18th century.

The Church of England parish church of Saint Mary burned down in 1897, and was replaced in 1957 by a new church in Cotswold materials, designed by the architect Harold Stratton Davis. The previous building was a small tin church with green painting.

On 31 December 2022, the 200-year old Air Balloon pub closed for the final time before demolition for upgrade work on the A417 road.

On 1 April 2023 Birdlip became a parish in its own right, having been part of Cowley.

== Amenities ==
Birdlip has a community primary school.

Located next to the primary school is Birdlip and Brimpsfield Cricket Club (BBCC). The club has three senior teams, playing on Wednesdays and Saturdays. BBCC is famous for once fielding a team made entirely of members of the Partridge family.

Birdlip is on the Cotswold Way, a National Trail running along the edge of The Cotswolds AONB. The view from Barrow Wake viewpoint in the village takes in much of the Vale of Gloucester. Barrow Wake was an infamous "dogging area".

== See also ==
- The Birdlip Mirror, a late-Iron age bronze mirror discovered in 1879 near Birdlip

== Sources ==
- Verey, David (1970). The Buildings of England: Gloucestershire: The Cotswolds. Harmondsworth: Penguin Books. pp. 112–113. ISBN 0-14-071040-X.
