= Basketweave (weaving) =

Textile weaving technique

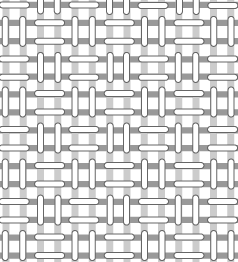
Structure of basketweave fabric, with each thread traveling over two, then under two threads of the opposing direction.

Basketweave (also known as Panama weave, hopsack weave, mat weave, or matt weave) is a simple type of textile weave.

In basketweave, groups of warp and weft threads are interlaced so that they form a simple criss-cross pattern. Each group of weft threads crosses an equal number of warp threads by going over one group, then under the next, and so on. The next group of weft threads goes under the warp threads that its neighbor went over, and vice versa. Basketweave can be identified by its checkered appearance, made of two or more threads in each group.

Monk's cloth is an example of a basketweave fabric.

The term Panama weave may also refer to a lightweight or midweight woollen fabric made using this weave. It is soft and loose, with a fine, grainy surface, used for men's and women's suits and dresses. The name of the fabric may also relate to the straw weave used in a Panama hat.
