= Emergency vehicle lighting =

Visual warning lights fitted to a vehicle

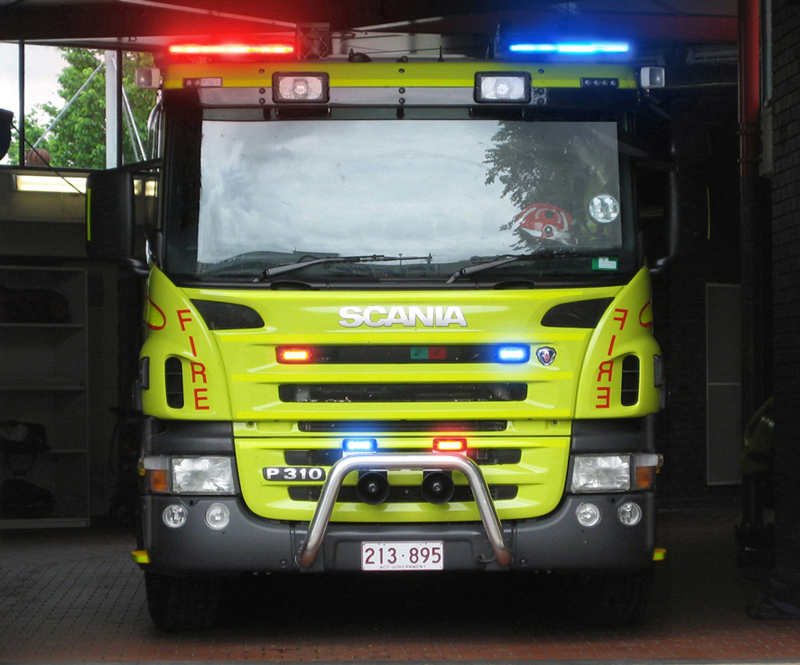
Red and blue emergency lights on a fire engine in Canberra, Australia

Emergency vehicle lighting, also known as simply emergency lighting or emergency lights, is a type of vehicle lighting used to visually announce a vehicle's presence to other road users. A sub-type of emergency vehicle equipment, emergency vehicle lighting is generally used by emergency vehicles and other authorized vehicles in a variety of colors.

Emergency vehicle lighting refers to any of several visual warning devices, which may be known as lightbars or beacons, fitted to a vehicle and used when the driver wishes to convey to other road users the urgency of their journey, to provide additional warning of a hazard when stationary, or in the case of law enforcement as a means of signalling another motorist that a traffic stop is being initiated. These lights may be dedicated emergency lights, such as a beacon or a lightbar, or modified stock lighting, such as a wig-wag or hideaway light, and are additional to any standard lighting on the car such as hazard lights. They are often used along with a siren system to increase their effectiveness and provide audible warnings alongside the visual warnings produced by the lights.

In many jurisdictions, the use of emergency lights may afford the user specific legal powers, and may place requirements on other road users to behave differently, such as compelling them to pull to the side of the road and yield right-of-way in traffic so the vehicle may proceed through unimpeded. Laws regarding and restricting the use of these lights vary widely among jurisdictions, and in some areas non-emergency vehicles such as school buses, and semi-emergency vehicles such as tow trucks, may be permitted to use similar lights.

A blue rotating emergency light

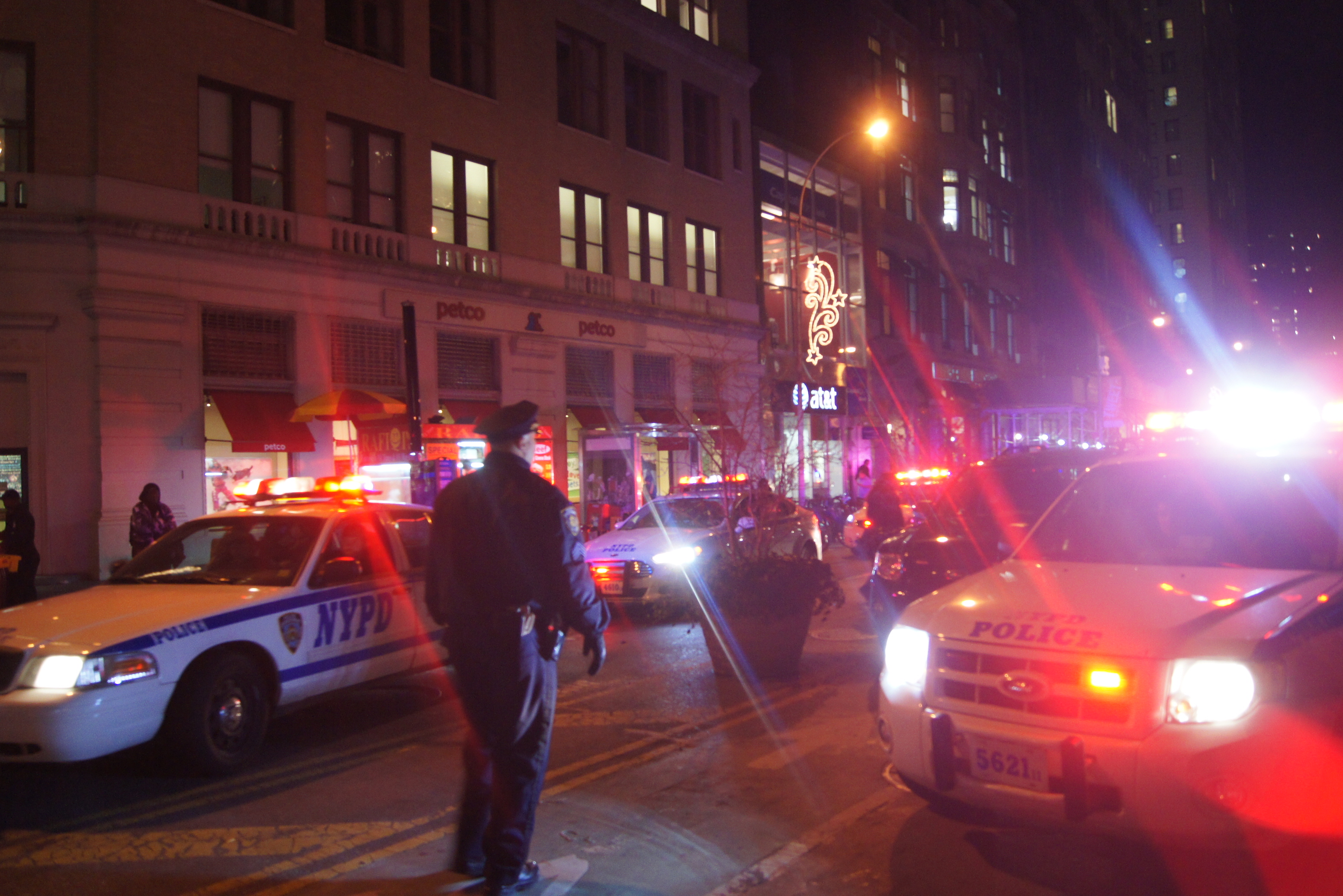
Police cars with red, white, and blue emergency lights

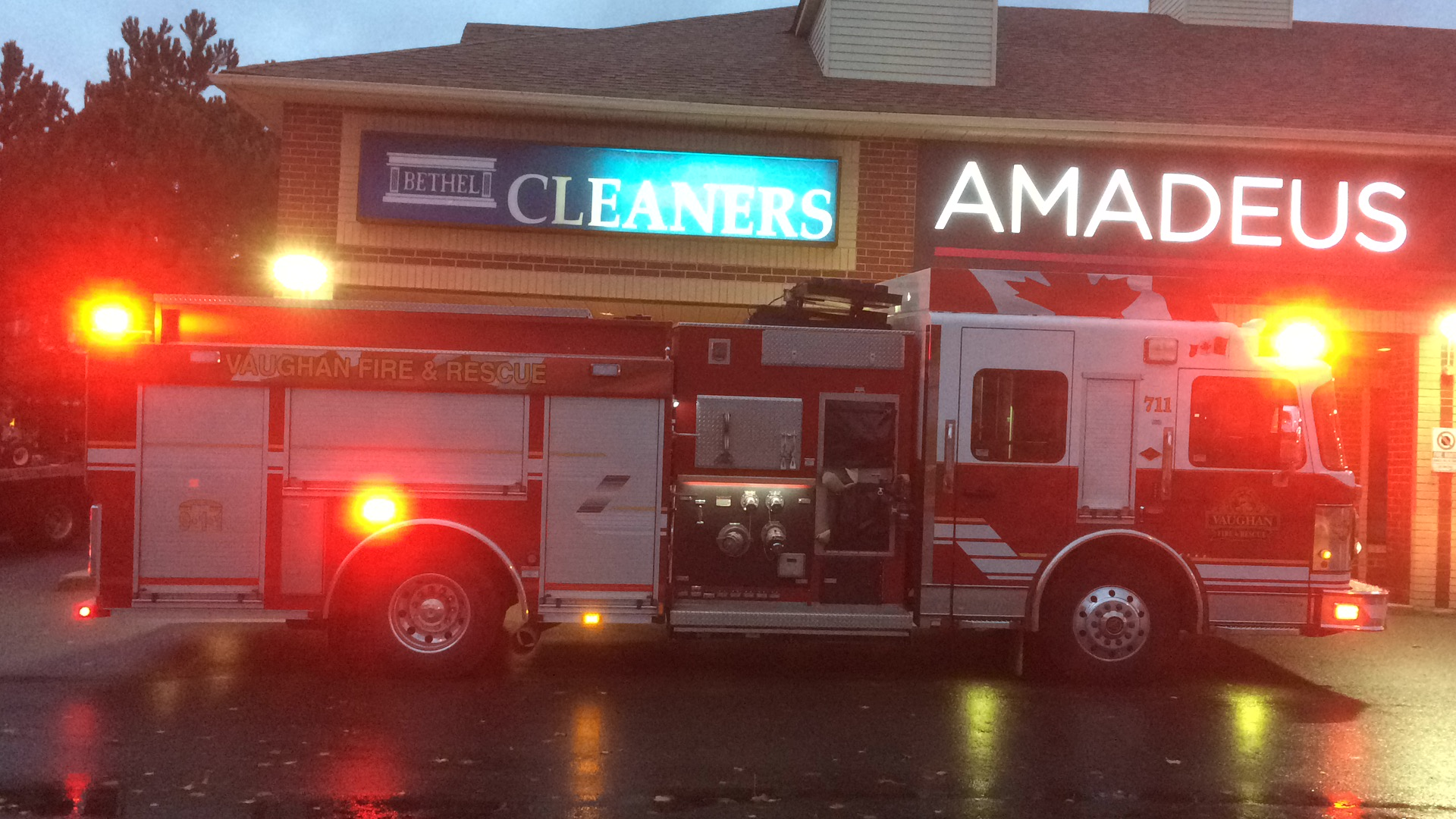
A fire truck with red emergency lights

== History ==
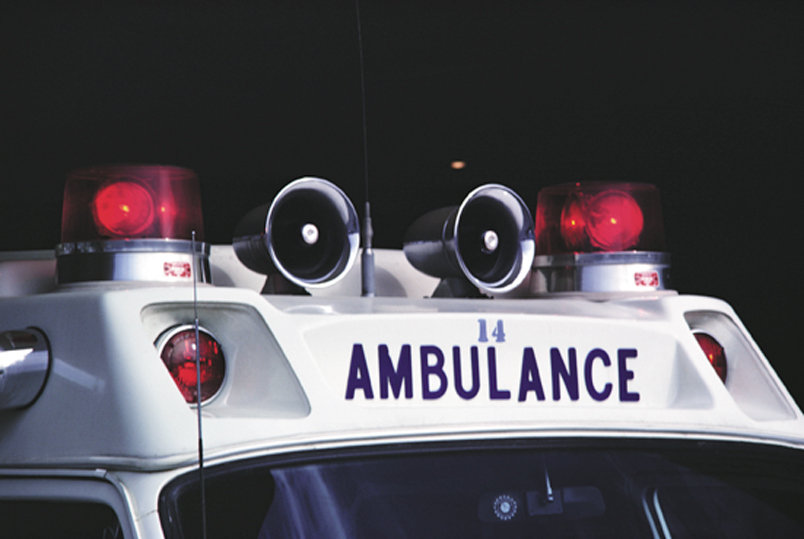
Lighting on an ambulance in the 1970s

Early emergency lights were often red lights mounted to the front or roof of a vehicle.

The use of the blue emergency light originates in Germany during World War II. As a result of the "Verdunkelung", a black-out measure for aerial defense from 1935, cobalt blue was regulated to replace the red color used until 1938 in German emergency vehicle lights. Due to the scattering properties of the blue color, it is only visible to lower altitudes and is therefore less easily spotted by enemy airplanes.

== Purpose ==
Emergency vehicle lighting is generally used to clear the right of way for emergency vehicles, or to warn approaching motorists of potential hazards, such as a vehicle that is stopped or moving slower than the rate of traffic, or a car that has been pulled over. It may also be used to provide specific directions to motorists, such as a command to pull over. Some vehicles incorporate a small arrow board to direct traffic.

The use of emergency beacons is restricted by law in many jurisdictions only for responding to an emergency, initiating a traffic stop, bona fide training exercises, or when a specific hazard exists in the road. Most private security agencies have special permits that allow them to use beacons in specific areas. It has yet to be determined whether autonomous vehicles will be required to carry lights, or what colors or patterns they might exhibit to warn off aggressive human drivers.

== Optical types ==
The optical and mechanical characteristics of the lights used can have a significant effect on the look of the vehicle and how readily it gains attention in emergencies.

=== Steady burning ===
The simplest form of lighting is a steadily burning lamp. These may be white lights used on scene to enable emergency workers to see what they are doing, or they may be colored lights that advertise the emergency vehicle's presence. In the latter case, steadily burning lights are often used alongside rotating or flashing lights rather than on their own, though historically some emergency vehicles only displayed steadily burning lights. For example, California Vehicle Code Section 25252 states: "Every authorized emergency vehicle shall be equipped with at least one steady burning red warning lamp visible from at least 1,000 feet to the front of the vehicle."

=== Rotating light ===
A fire truck responding with rotating red lights in Toronto

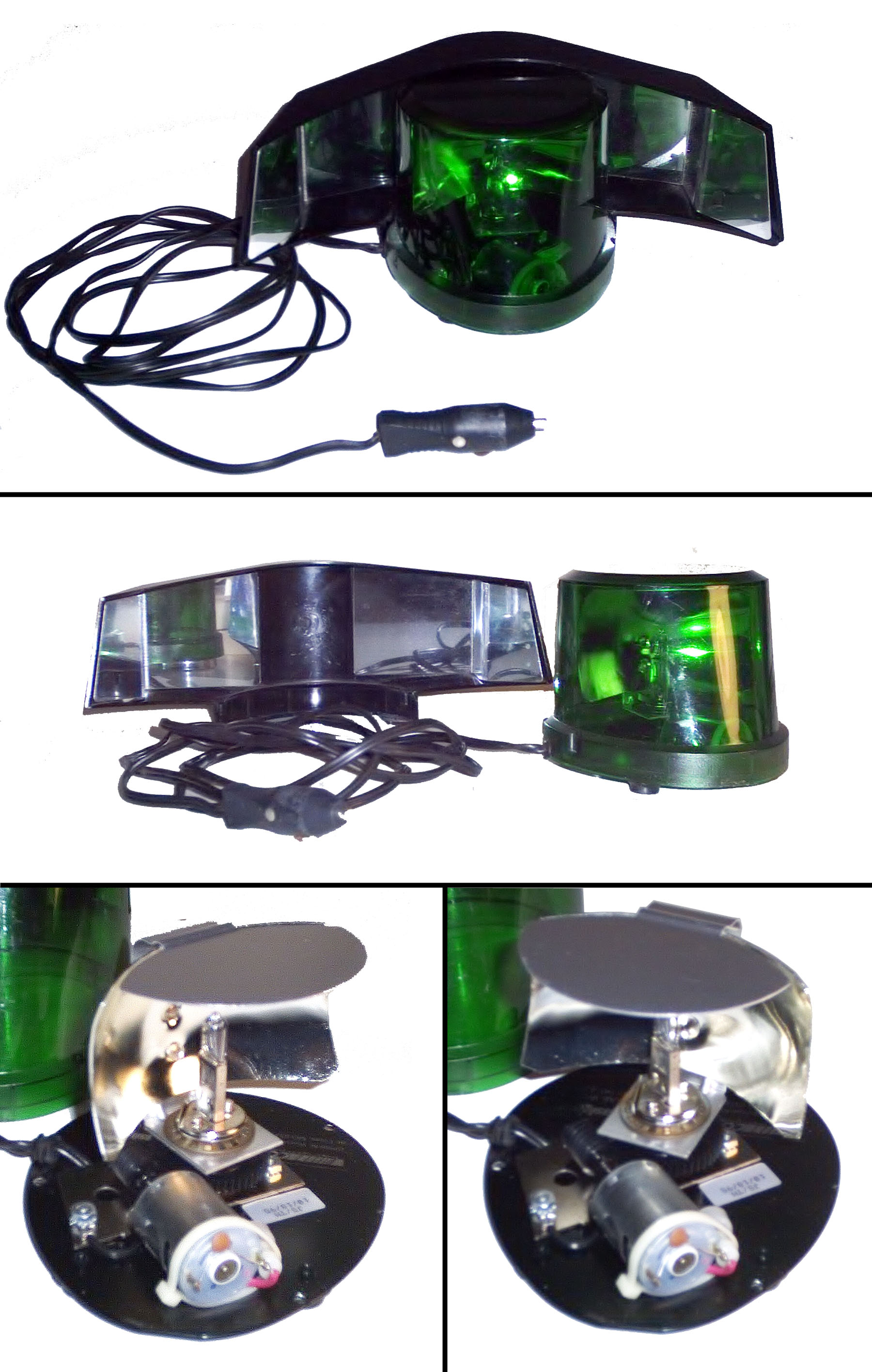
The parts and workings of a rotating light: Top The assembled beacon, including an optional mirror to be used when the beacon is placed in the windshield or rear window. Center The beacon, with the mirror removed. Bottom left and right The green dome of the beacon has been removed to show its rotating reflector, stationary incandescent lamp, and electric motor.

These revolving lights may contain a single, stationary bulb around which a curved mirror is spun (or which is attached to a spinning mirror), or a lamp with a Fresnel lens. This creates rotating beams of light, appearing to flash when viewed. Larger rotating lights may contain modular or sealed-beam lamps which rotate as an assembly (commonly two or four bulbs, but possibly one or three).

To protect the workings of the beacon, a plastic dome often covers the assembly. These domes usually come in solid colors, but in some cases the front and back halves of the dome are different colors. Other beacons use a clear dome with colored lenses on each lamp; in the latter case, these rotating beacons are sometimes referred to colloquially as ‘gumball machines’ or sometimes ‘cherry tops’ in the case of red lights.

Rotating lights often use a quartz-halogen or conventional incandescent bulb, though some rotating beacons are now made with LEDs rather than bulbs.

Rotating lights may be used in lightbars as well as in single beacons. In a modern enclosed lightbar, generally ‘V’- or diamond-shaped mirrors are provided between the lamps to give the effect of multiple flashing lights.

=== Strobe lights ===
Some emergency lighting is based on strobe lights similar to those used in flash photography. These xenon flash lamps put out a very brief but very bright flash by discharging a large current through a gas which ionizes it. The light produced has a somewhat bluish emission spectrum, which makes red lightbars glow a fuchsia-pink color when lit.

Strobe lighting did provide intense light which could improve visibility, but the short duration of the individual flash made it necessary to design the electronics to issue multiple consecutive flashes before alternating with the other associated lens pair. This purportedly allowed time for the human eye and mind to key in and observe the source of the light. Since the changeover to LED lighting units, which could easily allow for longer duration illumination time, they have instead chosen to mimic what is actually a shortcoming of the strobe light, and design the LED light head to illuminate with multiple short duration flashes. It has been noted that depending on the surrounding lighting conditions and other vehicle lighting, strobe only warning lighting did not allow for the same level of perception of distance from the source that traditional light bar and incandescent flashing lights would provide, especially on dark highways and similar locations.

=== LED lighting ===
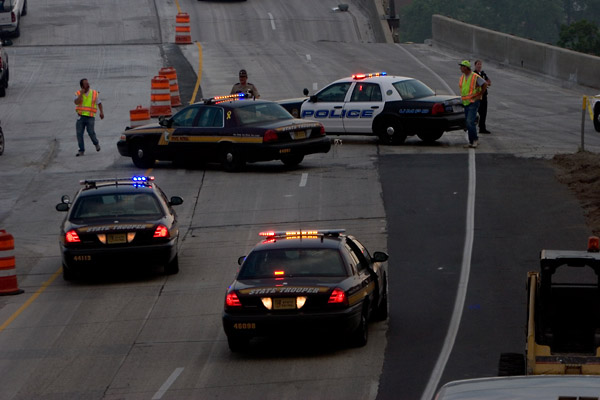
Police cars at the base of the I-35W bridge collapse. The lightbars mounted on the cars are LED-based. The illuminated back-up lamps seen in the two cars in the foreground are being used as emergency lights which operate on a different circuit, rather than burning steadily to indicate that the cars are in reverse gear.

LED lighting on an ambulance in Toronto

Light-emitting diodes are small, completely solid state, very power-efficient, long-lasting (as they have no filaments to burn out) and can be seen very easily even at great distances and in sunlight. LED emergency lights entered standard use around the 2000s and 2010s, replacing most rotating and strobe lights.

Whether as lightbars or single beacons, LED-based lights typically use a clear, colorless dome because the light color is an intrinsic property of the LEDs themselves. LED-based lightbars can be made very thin, reducing wind resistance by around 8-10 percent, or made very flat and used in novel applications, for example to flip up under a sun visor.

LED lights are often used in a mode similar to conventional strobe lights, however they can be programmed with a wider variety of flash patterns because of their ability to be switched directly by electronics, as opposed to discharging a capacitor through a gas-filled tube.

LED lights produce relatively little heat when in use. In colder inclement climates, this has resulted in LED emergency vehicle warning lights (as well as traffic lights) being obscured by the buildup of frost or snow, raising safety concerns. Solutions are being researched to provide a heat source, as necessary in certain weather conditions, to keep LED lights clear of snow and frost.

=== Modification of stock lighting ===
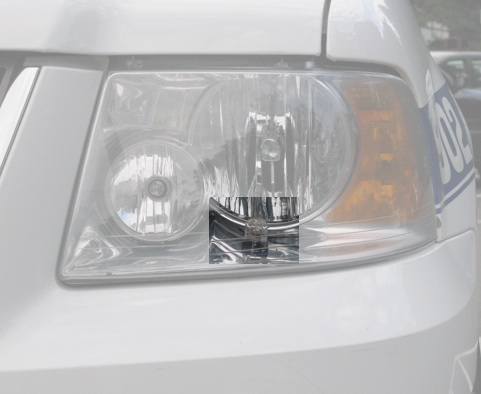
A hide-away strobe light fitted into a headlamp. The strobe light is the coiled glass tube in the bottom of the headlight assembly, near the center of the highlighted region of the picture (click picture to enlarge).

The vehicle's stock lighting may also be modified to add flashing and strobe effects. This can be done by adding electronics to the existing lighting system (for instance, to create a wig-wag), or by drilling holes in the reflectors of stock lighting and inserting flashing lights in those holes.

=== Information matrix signs ===
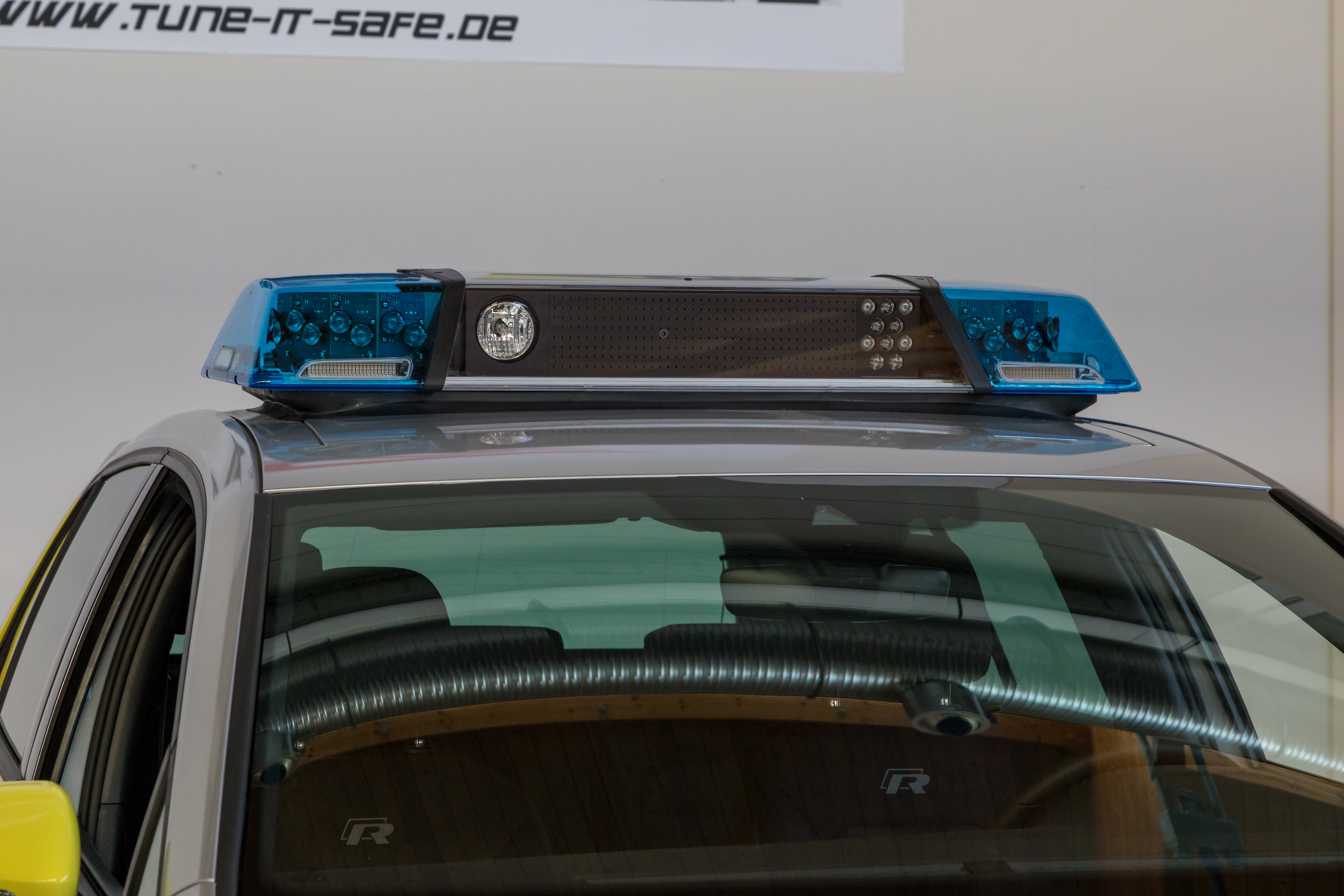
LED Information matrix sign (black surface) on a police car between the beacon and search lights of a Hella RTK7 lightbar

Some emergency vehicles use signs made up of a large number of light sources (usually LEDs), which can be programmed to display messages to other road users. This can be used to request other vehicles to pull over, indicate a special instruction, or just to display the name of the operating service (e.g. "Police").

== Mounting types ==
Diagram showing potential mounting positions for internal, body mounted, and removable beacons on a first generation Ford Crown Victoria

Emergency lighting may be fitted to several places on a vehicle, depending on the degree of conspicuity required. Beacons and lightbars are often mounted on the roof for high visibility, while other lights may be mounted on the body, in the grille, or in the interior of the vehicle.

=== Roof-mounted single beacon ===
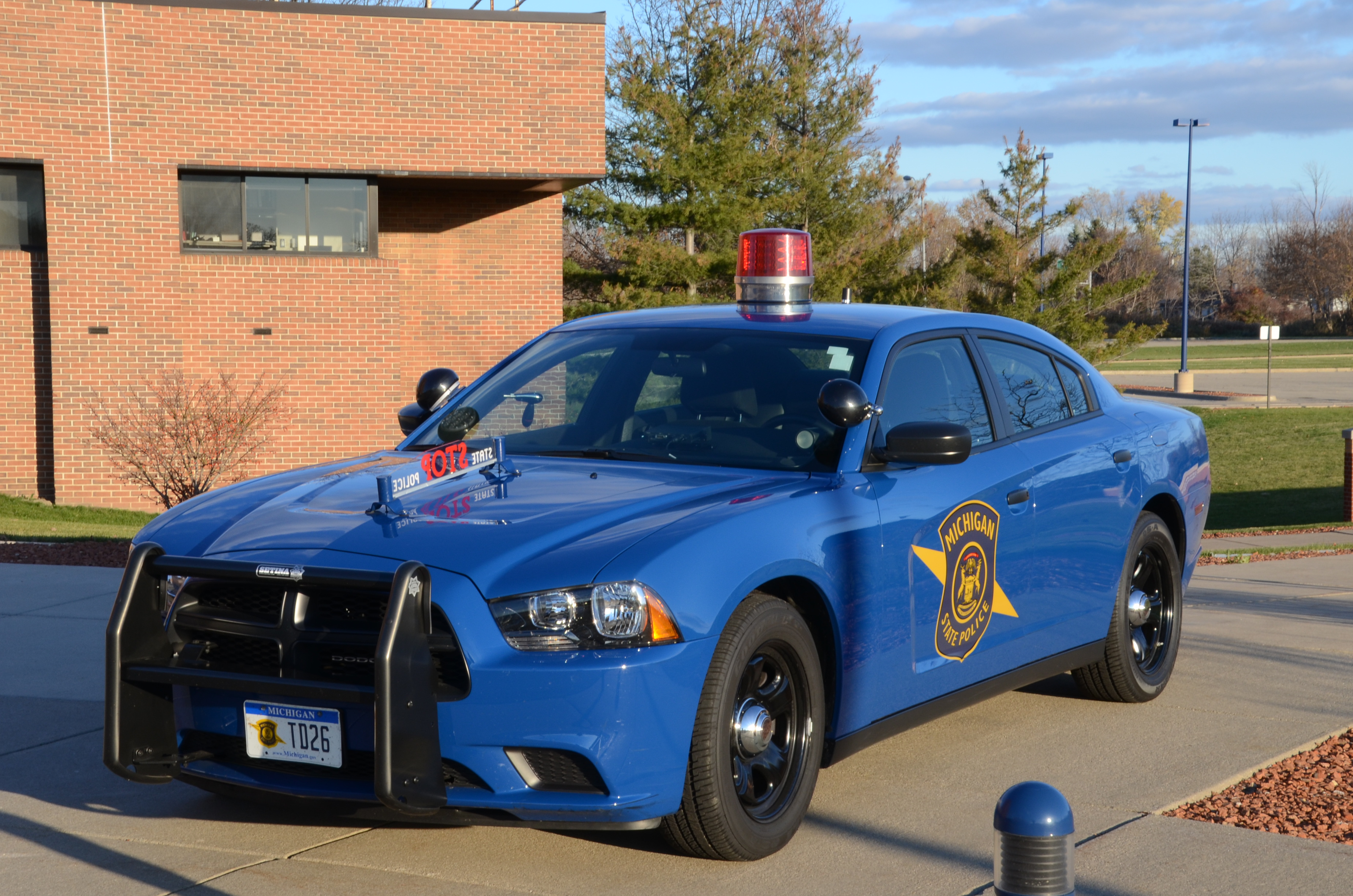
A Michigan State Police cruiser with a single red beacon (nicknamed a gum ball machine) and hood fin

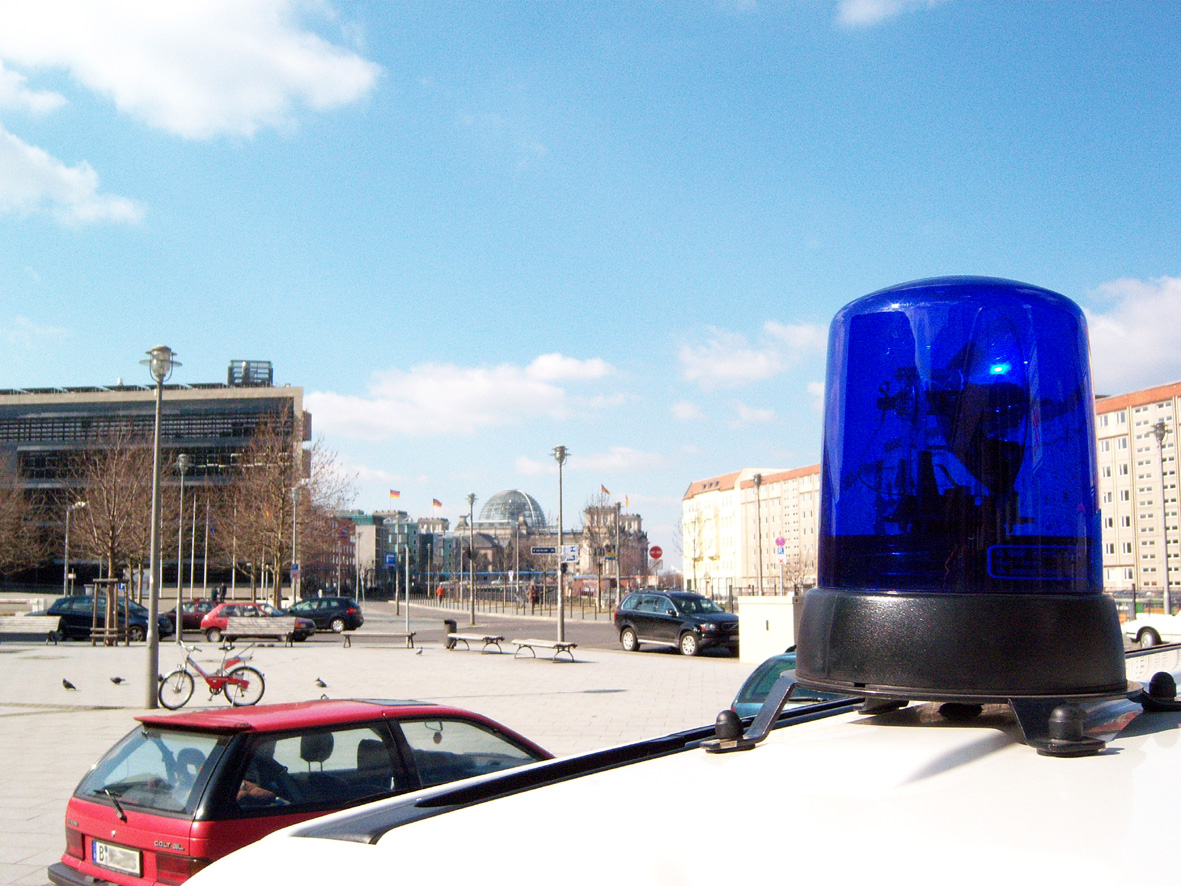
A blue rotating beacon seen on a vehicle in Germany

Since their introduction in 1948, rotating beacons have become widely accepted as a means of attracting attention to one's vehicle. Although the use of the single beacon in law enforcement has dropped since the introduction of light bars, they are still used by some police departments, because of their lower cost or due to tradition. One agency that continues to employ traditional red rotating beacons on its patrol cars is the Michigan State Police. Beacons are also occasionally used on construction equipment when a full-sized lightbar would be unnecessary or impractical to attach to the vehicle.

While many single beacons use rotating lamps or mirrors, others use strobe lights under a translucent dome to provide an omnidirectional flash. Some smaller and low-cost beacons of the latter type, however, are simply a blinking incandescent bulb. LEDs are also used to light some omnidirectional beacons.

The single beacon is also available with a magnetic mount for situations where permanent mounting is impractical. Examples of such situations would be detectives in unmarked vehicles, volunteer firefighters, or managers at freight yards who use an amber light for safety. These ‘mag-mount’ beacons are often round or teardrop-shaped, and are often referred to as ‘Kojak’ lights after the popular 1970s TV detective who used one.

=== Lightbar ===
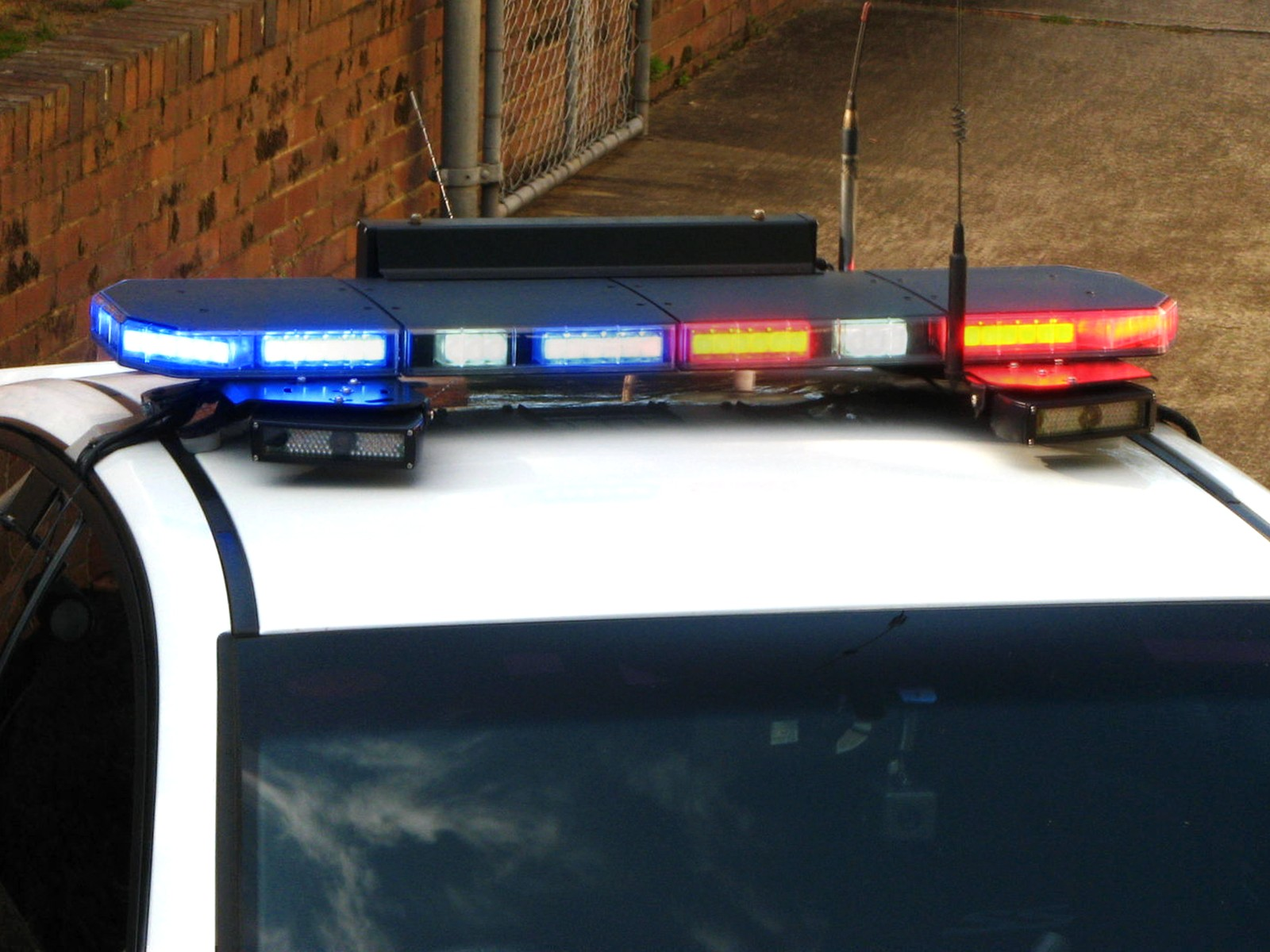
An LED lightbar on a police car, also fitted with ANPR cameras

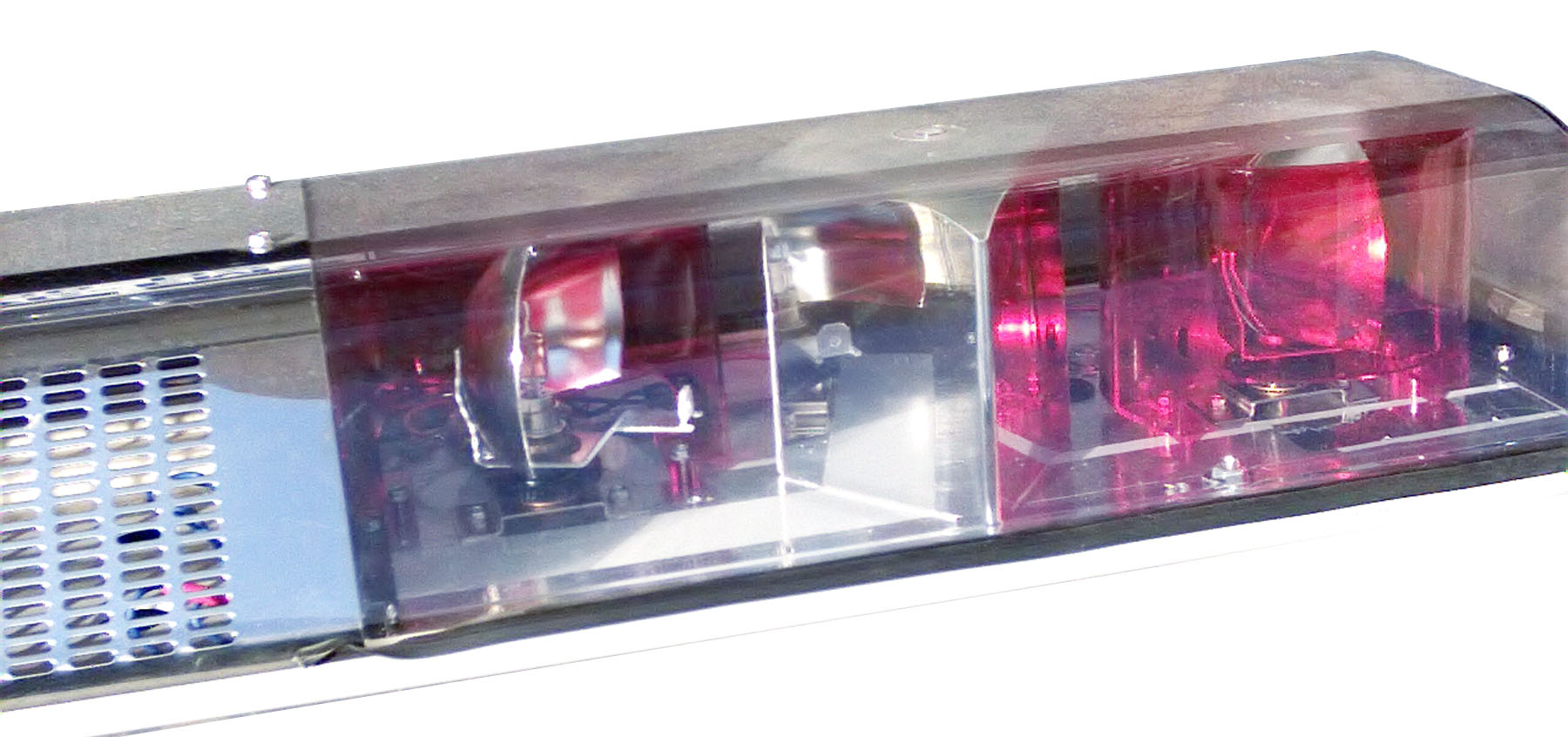
This light bar has a clear dome under which two rotating lights can be seen. A siren speaker can be installed behind the grille.

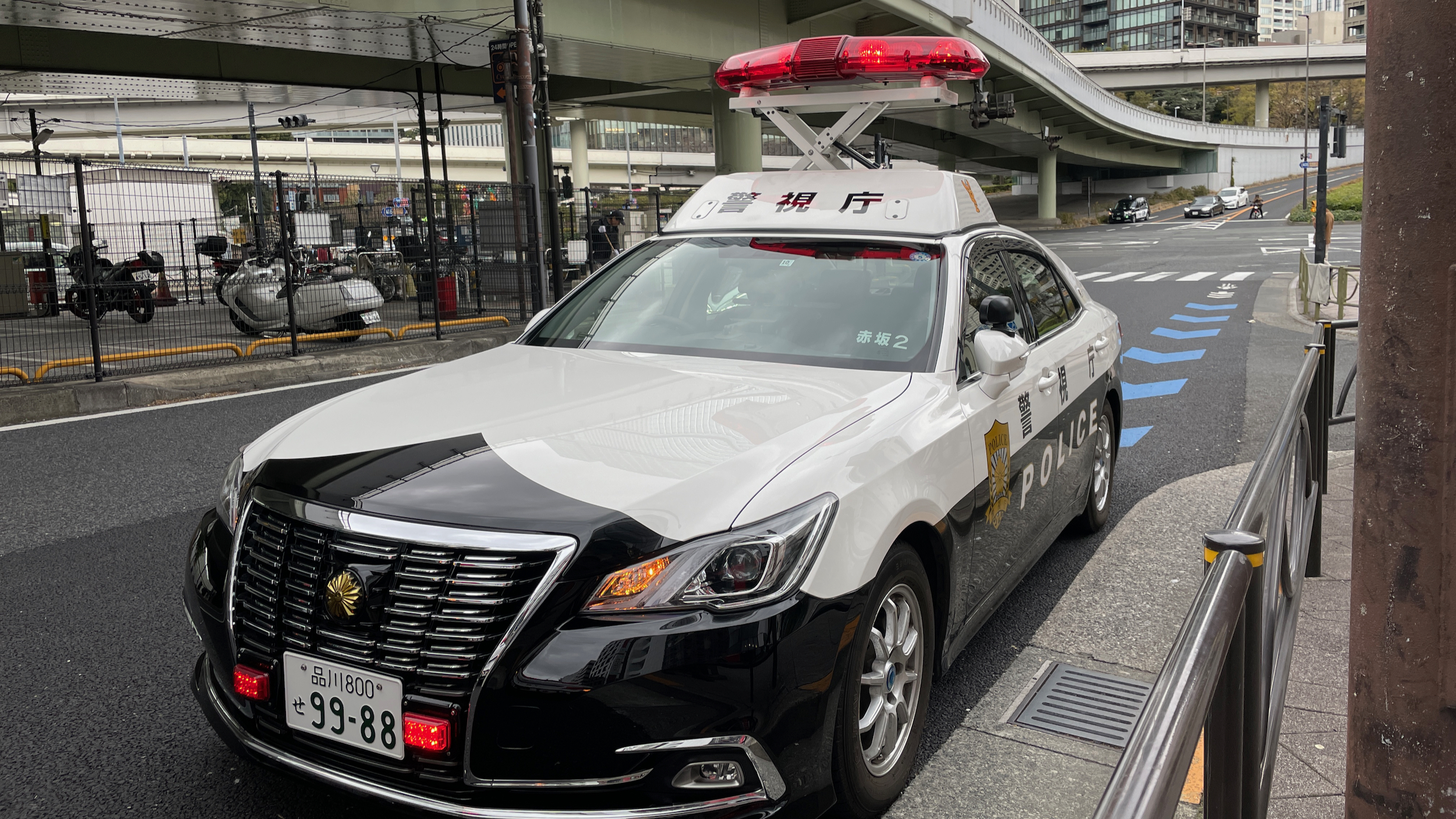
A Tokyo police car with the lightbar raised for greater visibility

Originally, this referred to a simple metal bar on the roof of the vehicle upon which agencies would mount two rotating beacons, as well as other components such as sirens and stationary ‘lollipop’ lights. Soon the beacon manufacturers began producing off-the-shelf complete ‘lightbars’ (including in the United States).

Later, the individual components of the lightbar were integrated into a single contiguous unit, with two elongated domes on either side of a siren enclosure. The extended domes allowed for more rotating beacons, additional mirrors, and fixed-beam lights toward the center to replace the ‘lollipops’.

Lightbars may now contain fixed, rotating, strobe, or LED-based lights in various configurations and offering programmable flash patterns. They may include a second, lower, tier of lamps, such as clear halogen ‘takedown’ lights towards the front to illuminate the vehicle being stopped, clear side-facing ‘alley’ spotlights, additional amber or red towards the rear for scene protection, or directional traffic advisory arrows. The modern trend of locating sirens on or near the front bumper of emergency vehicles has resulted in many lightbar models eliminating the siren housing in lieu of more lighting.

Some lightbar variations are specialized to meet certain desires of the agencies utilizing them, such as those using multiple rotating beacons in a ‘V’ pattern to provide additional illumination to the sides of the vehicle, and those designed to hug the roof of a vehicle to minimize air resistance or present a lower profile for ‘stealth’ purposes.

In Japan, many urban emergency vehicles will have lighting that can be mechanically raised when parked to provide greater visibility and safety for personnel working on the ground.

=== Body mounted ===
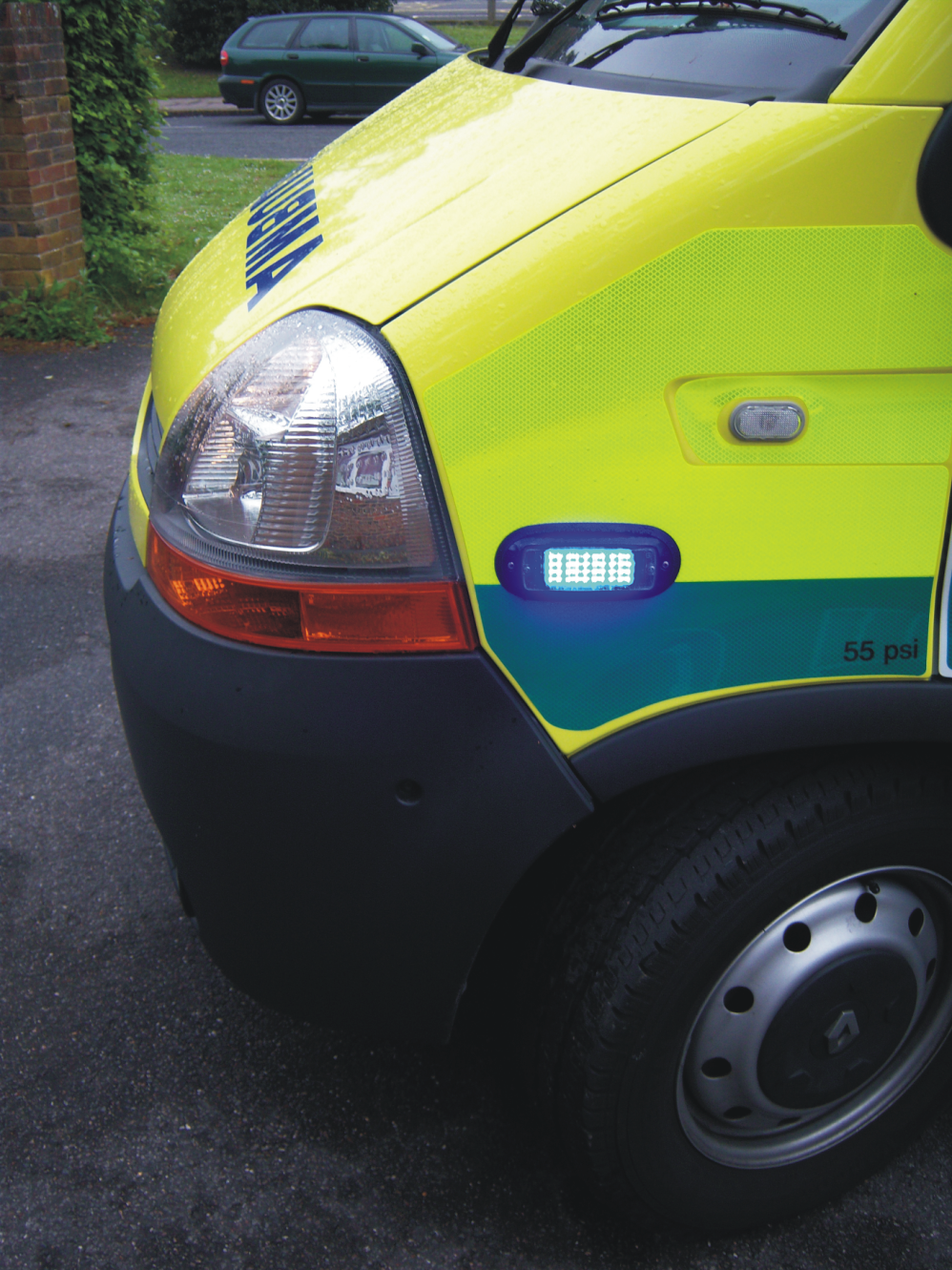
Body mounted beacon in operation, used to draw attention to the vehicle as it emerges from side roads

Some types of light can be mounted on to the outside of the vehicle (usually a permanent install) and these can be used to provide directional lighting in key areas, such as in front for clearing traffic, or to the rear for scene protection. They can also form part of the main lighting arrangement for subtly marked or unmarked vehicles. In this application, the operating service may choose to use lights with clear lenses so as to minimize the possibility of the lights being noticed when not on.

Common places to mount such beacons include on or in the grille of the vehicle and on the front of the rear view mirrors, where they can gain maximum visibility. In the UK many emergency vehicles have lights on the side of the bonnet, which helps to warn oncoming traffic when pulling out of junctions. These lights are often strobe or LED types, as they have the lowest profile for purposes of attachment.

=== Interior mounted ===
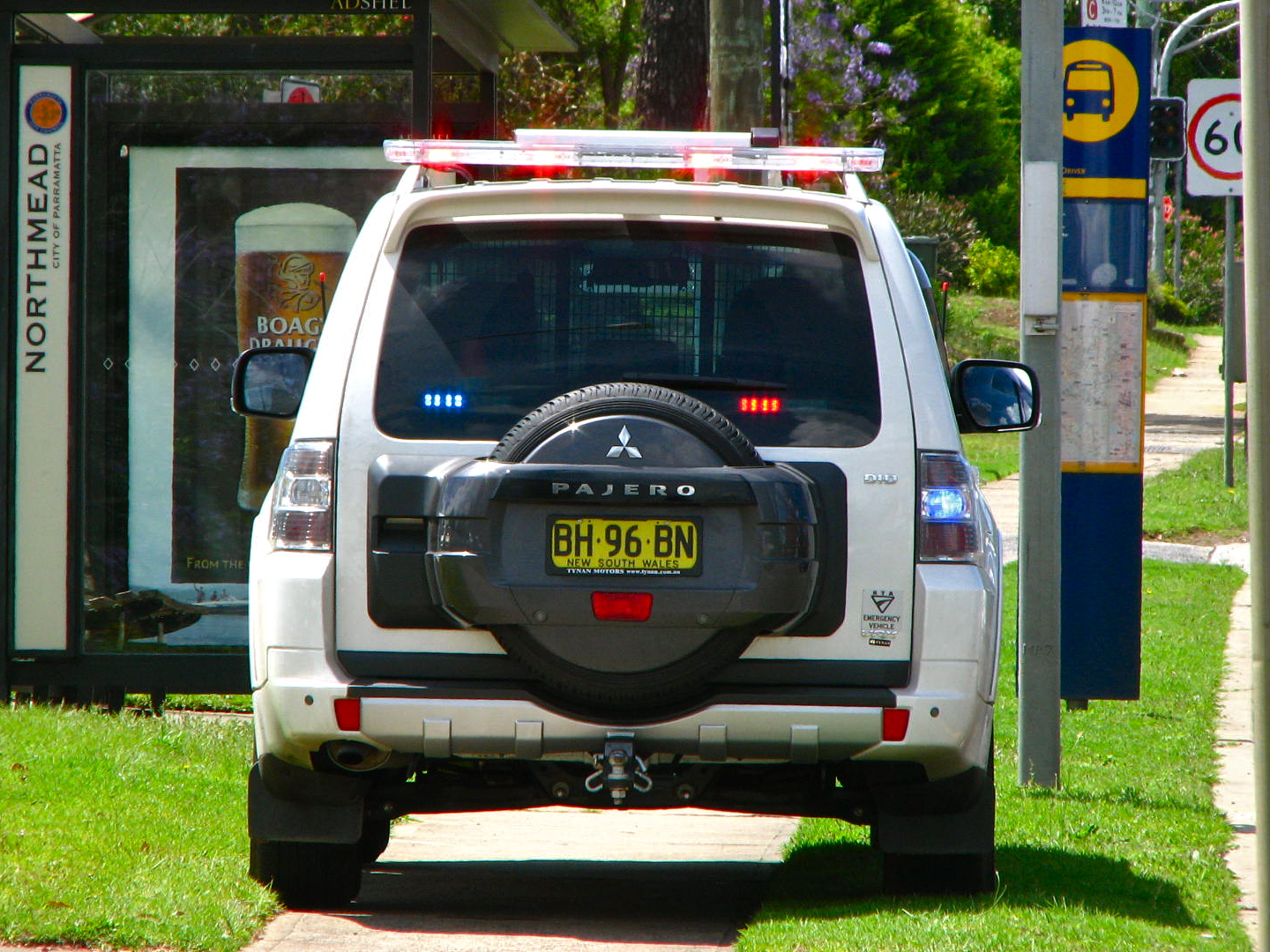
A Roads & Traffic Authority vehicle in Australia with interior mounted lights on the rear windshield, along with a lightbar and integrated lighting in the tail lamps

A variety of emergency lights may be used in the interior of a vehicle, generally on the dashboard, visor area, or rear deck. Uses range from discreet or temporary lighting for unmarked vehicles and volunteer responders, to additional rear lighting on fully marked vehicles, to a ‘slick-top’ configuration not unlike a full lightbar set.

Interior lighting is available in a variety of form factors, ranging from flat LED panels under the sun visors, to halogen or strobe lights mounted on the rear deck, to ‘cherry’ or oscillating ‘teardrop’ lights mounted on the dash. These may be permanently mounted and wired into the vehicle's electrical system, or they may be temporarily mounted and plug into the vehicle's cigarette lighter. They are often fitted with shields which direct the light through the window, but prevent reflections in to the cab.

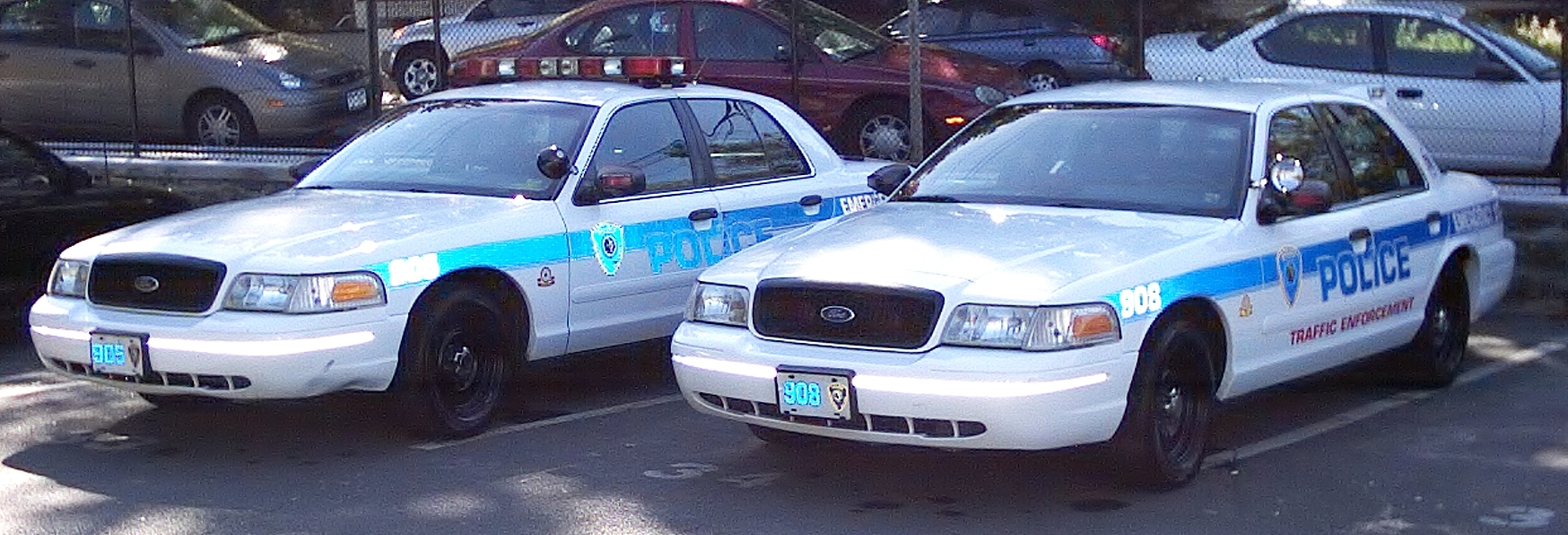
The police car on the right is a slicktop car, lacking the traditional roof-mounted lightbar seen on the car on the left.

The aerodynamic properties of light bars can be important for police applications, as fuel efficiency and drag are concerns in patrol and pursuit. Because of this, some police cars do not have roof mounted lightbars. These "slick-top" cars mount their emergency lights within the cruiser, generally around the periphery of the windshield or into the leading or trailing edge of the roof. Slick-top police cars also lack the silhouette of a lightbar or beacon, making the car harder to identify as a police vehicle from a distance, especially fore and aft. Because of these visual advantages, these vehicles are sometimes referred to as "stealth" vehicles.

A key disadvantage of relying solely on internal lighting is the number of lights required to achieve true 360 degree visibility, with most lights usually concentrated front and rear. This can limit the application of vehicles for instances such as scene protection.

=== Vehicle integral ===
Sometimes, the existing lighting on a vehicle is modified to create warning beacons. In the case of wig-wag lighting, this involves adding a device to alternately flash the high-beam headlights, or, in some countries, the rear fog lights. It can also involve drilling out other lights on the vehicle to add "hideaway" or "corner strobes".

== Scientific research ==
=== Perception ===
A study at Loughborough University in the United Kingdom showed that strobe lighting conveyed a greater sense of urgency to other road users, with the faster the flash the greater urgency, potentially helping to speed the emergency vehicle through traffic. It also concluded that factors such as flash pattern were important, with simultaneously flashing beacons attracting attention far quicker than alternately flashing versions, although this did increase discomfort glare. In general, as light intensity and the number of beacons present increased, the time it took to gain the attention of other drivers decreased.

This same study compared different light colors for glare and detection time under both daylight and night conditions. While red and blue both compared favorably with amber for glare under various conditions, some contradictory findings were observed for detection time. When all colors were held at equal intensity, amber had the poorest detection time both daytime and night. However, when the light source was held at constant intensity, the amber filters, which generally let the most light through, had the best detection time.

=== Potential hazards ===
There may be a number of hazards to other road users related to the use of emergency beacons, and these effects should be mitigated as far as possible during vehicle design. These potential hazards include:

- Photosensitive epilepsy - This is an epileptic reaction to flashing lights in susceptible persons, which can range in severity from an unusual feeling or involuntary twitch to a generalized seizure. This epileptogenic response can be triggered by lights flashing in the frequency range of 10–20 Hz, regardless of color. While individual light sources used on emergency vehicles generally have much lower flash rates than this, the Loughborough study suggests that such possibilities be minimized. It also notes that emergency workers may report distraction and eyestrain unrelated to epilepsy from working under the lights.
- Glare - A bright light source in a person's field of view can reduce their ability to see other objects. The effect may be exacerbated by rain, windshields, or eyeglasses. The study distinguished between ‘disability glare’, where a driver may be temporarily blinded and unable to see hazards in the road, versus ‘discomfort glare’, which is a more general effect from lights which may cause motorists to avert their eyes. The worst effects for disability glare occurred with amber beacons, strobe beacons, and especially bright lights.
- Phototaxis - This is the so-called ‘moth-to-flame’ effect, where the hypothesis runs that some drivers may be so distracted by the beacons that they are ‘drawn’ to them. The Loughborough study, referencing the February 1998 issue of the U.S. trade journal Tow Times, asserts that there was a lawsuit in the U.S. where a tow operator was found liable for an accident for this reason, though the study authors were unable to locate any supporting scientific research.

Another documented hazard is an increased risk of ambulance crashes when lights and sirens are used; a large analysis of national EMS data found significantly higher collision odds when warning devices were activated, especially during patient transport. (Watanabe et al., 2018).

== Usage by country ==
The color of a vehicle's emergency lights is useful to denote the type of vehicle or situation, but the relationship between color and service varies widely by jurisdiction.

By far the most common colors for the core emergency services to use are blue and red, and there are some arguments for using both. One study found that for flashing lights, red was more easily perceived in daylight, and blue at night. Furthermore, red has advantages in haze and fog, while blue stands out against traffic at night. On the other hand, a different study found that red had the quickest detection times at night.

In most of Europe emergency vehicles use blue lights. However, it is a darker specification blue than used in other parts of the world.

Red lights are not common in Europe, though they are used in some countries where red has a specific meaning. Police in Finland, Estonia, Germany and Sweden use a forward-facing red light to indicate that a driver must pull over and stop. In the UK, police cars use blue lights with additional white lights at the front and red lights at the rear to help other road users determine direction of travel. The rear red lights can be switched on and off separately from blue lights to indicate caution. Fire Command units are also equipped with them when being used for command duties. As are certain by-law enforcement and a small selection of private security companies. Austria, Germany and Sweden also use red on fire vehicles to designate the command post; in other countries a single green beacon sometimes designates the command post. In Sweden, a green strobe will indicate a medical command vehicle. Greece uses red on fire engines, and red along with blue on police vehicles. In Hungary, red is used only along with blue (on right in lightbars and roof integration) by police (including military police and diplomatic escort) and ambulance. In Poland, red is used on designated vehicles, including police and military vehicles, to indicate the beginning and/or end of a convoy (of those type of vehicles). Until recently the National Police in Slovakia used only blue lights, they have recently started using red and blue lights; Municipal and Military Police used blue lights in Slovakia. In Russia and Belarus, traffic police use red and blue lights, while conventional police along with the rest of the emergency services use only blue lights.

=== Argentina ===
Argentina uses blue for police, red for fire, green for ambulances, and amber for utility vehicles. Blue can be seen on fire appliances (either completely or alongside red lights) as a result of certain vehicles being imported/donated from European countries (Germany, Netherlands, UK) and retaining their original all blue lenses.

=== Australia ===
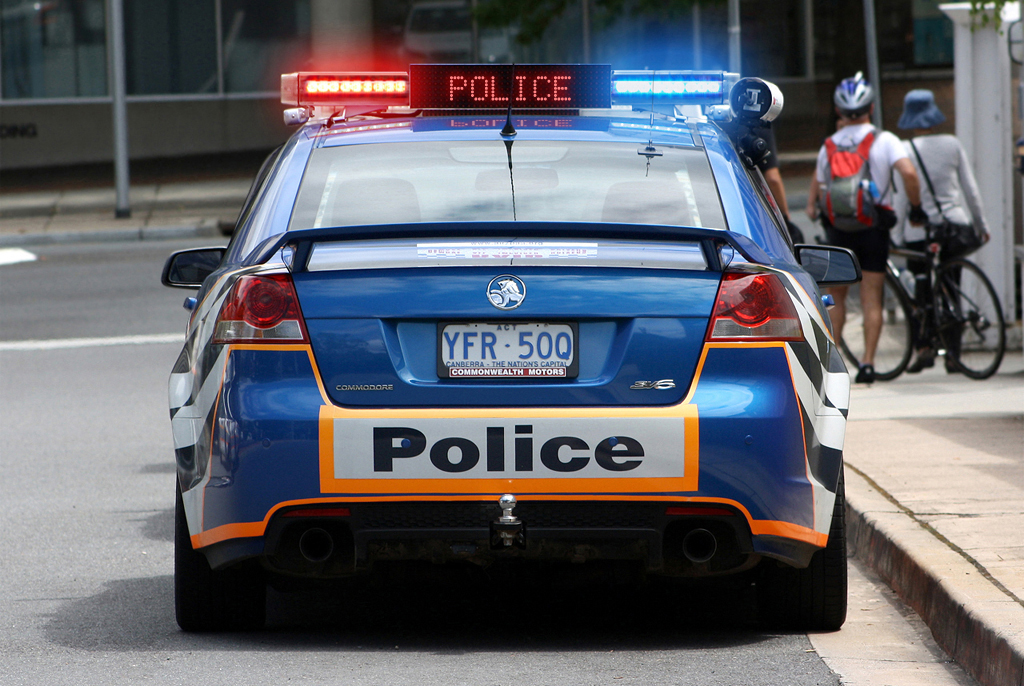
An ACT Police vehicle with red and blue lights. Also seen is an LED message board, which can display static or scrolling text.

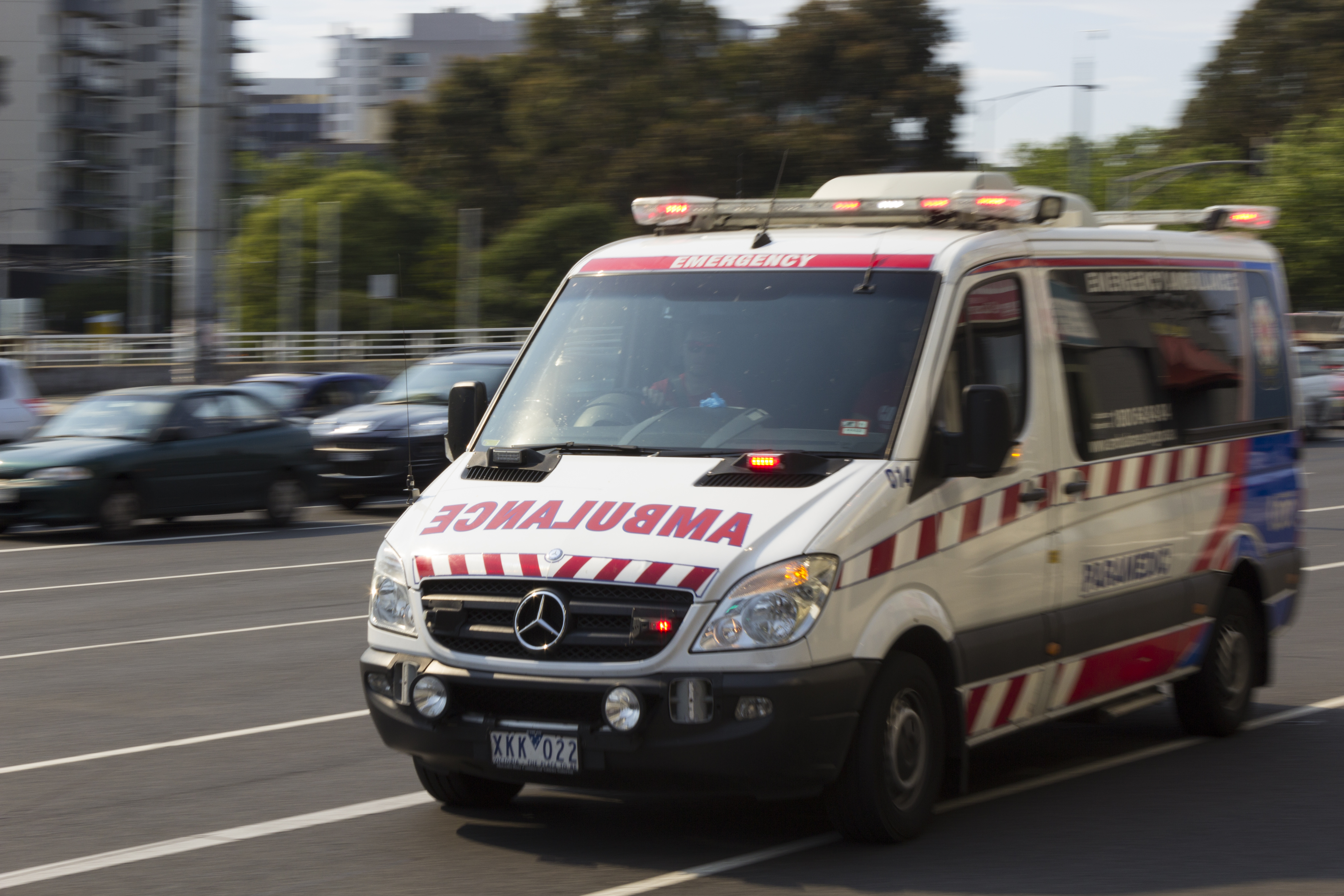
A Victorian Ambulance responding with alternating blue and red flashing lights

In Australia, colors are generally regulated at the state level, but there are some commonalities:

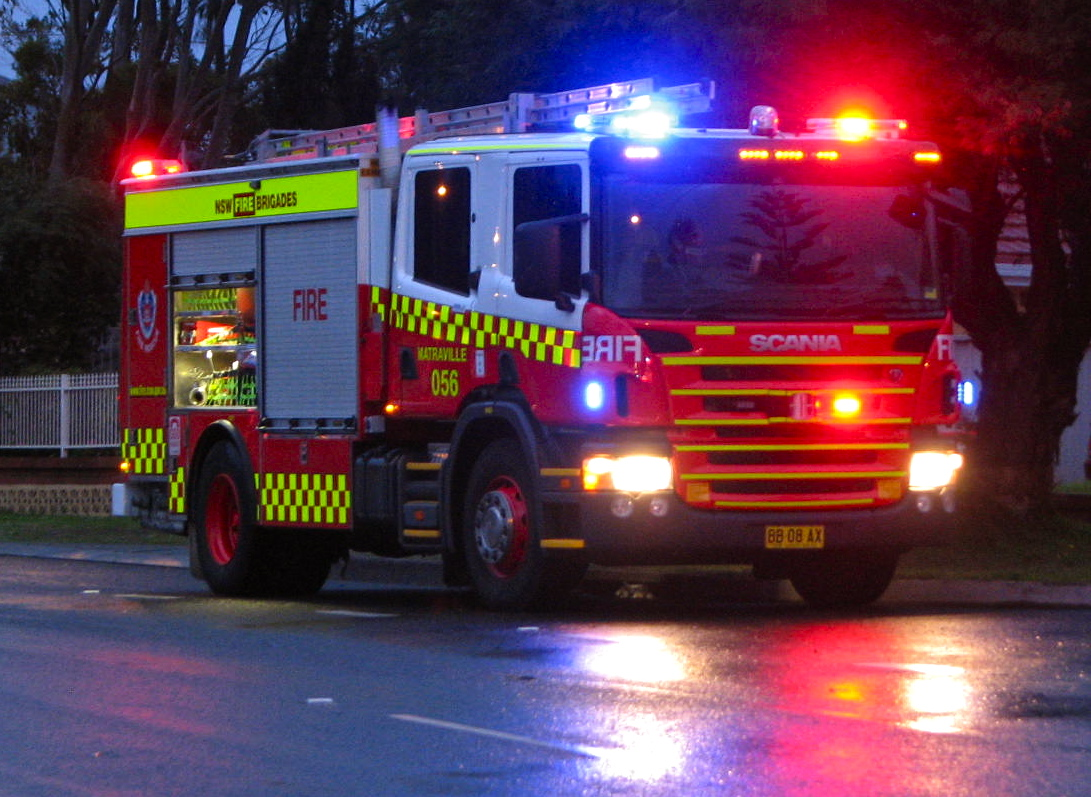
A Fire and Rescue New South Wales fire truck on scene with red and blue lights

==== Red and blue ====
This is used by all State and Federal Police forces, NT Police, Naval Police, Military Police, Air Force Police and Australian Border Force motor vehicles. Red and blue is also used by all State and Australian Defence Force fire and ambulance services. Civilian Ambulance and most fire units across the country use red and blue lights with State Emergency Service motor vehicles in most states being authorised to use the red and blue light combination (WA SES only fit red and blue lights to Priority One Cliff/Vertical Rescue or Road Crash Rescue vehicles, with all others having red only). The NSW Volunteer Rescue Association use these attending road, cave, cliff, swift water, and other rescues. Aviation Rescue Fire Fighting (ARFF) use Red and Blue lights when responding to incidents outside of the airport boundary on public roads. New South Wales also allows red and blue to be used by Transport for NSW traffic commanders and traffic response crews designated as emergency vehicles.

==== Red ====
Red lights signify a risk-to-life situation, and are used alone by Aviation Rescue Fire Fighting (ARFF, when responding to incidents within the airports boundary), Mines Rescue, Red Cross blood/organ transport, St John Ambulance Service and all WA State Emergency Service vehicles that do not perform a special function warranting red and blue lights. Local government rangers that serve as fire control officers typically have red and amber lighting within WA. Red lighting used to be in use for fire engines, ambulances, Patient Transport Service (PTS) ambulances in Queensland (as in most other states until the 1990s) before they changed to red and blue. New vehicles operated by some country/rural fire services have the ability to flash red lights independently from blue to identify that the vehicle is in distress, I.e. experiencing a "burnover".

==== Amber ====
Amber or yellow lights are used by roadside breakdown vehicles, railway companies, security patrol vehicles, tow trucks, road construction/repair motor vehicles and most other utility vehicles. Amber is also used by motor vehicles operating in and around airports and docks, this includes Australian Federal Police and Australian Border Force vehicles which are fitted with additional amber lighting to supplement their red and blue lightbars. Queensland State Emergency Service motor vehicles are only authorized to display amber lights under certain circumstances. Ambulances operated in the Australian Capital Territory often have steady burning amber lights on all four sides of the vehicle. Police security and traffic camera section vehicles operated by South Australia Police are fitted with amber warning lights

==== Green ====
These are used to denote a stationary ambulance, fire or police command motor vehicle. In Queensland it is also used on some Queensland Parks and Wildlife Service (QPWS) fire units along with the amber. Further, in Queensland, some municipal animal control units use a green and amber light combination. In addition to indicating a command point, some Australian fire services, particularly ones that fight rural fires, use green lights to indicate a fill point, I.e. a place where a tanker can fill up with water, like a large water tanker or a pump trailer situated next to a dam/lake. Further to this, some fire services utilise alternating white and green lights to identify a fill point, in order to differentiate from command vehicles. Due to camera speed and red-light enforcement, costly green Hella Surface Mount LED Courtesy Lamps are fitted near the number plates of NSW Ambulances, to indicate that the rapidly flashing emergency lights are also in operation.

==== Blue ====
Blue lights are reserved for emergency motor vehicles in general, such as police, fire, ambulance, State Emergency Service and traffic commanders. Blue by itself is also used by airport emergency vehicles to designate a command vehicle. Historically, blue by itself was used by all State and Federal Police from the 1960s until the 1990s when all agencies began to switch to a common red/blue mix. In 2018, NSW Police partially reintroduced only-blue lights as a trial on some highway patrol vehicles, which was ultimately evaluated unsuccessful. Subsequent vehicles delivered to the force were commissioned with the standard red/blue configuration.

==== Magenta ====
Sometimes referred to as purple, magenta lights are primarily used by the National Heavy Vehicle Regulator (NHVR), heavy vehicle enforcement/escort officers of Transport for NSW, VicRoads and South Australian and Queensland Transport Safety Inspectors. They are also used in combination with amber lights by some council rangers and the New South Wales Ministry of Transport. In Western Australia, magenta is used by the Department of Biodiversity, Conservation and Attraction's ‘HAZMAT Response Unit’. Magenta is also used on some escort vehicles used whilst escorting large mining equipment to the north of Western Australia. Within Queensland, vehicles utilised by conservation officers and forest officers under the Queensland Parks and Wildlife Service may be fitted with magenta lights as well as sirens. In addition, fisheries officers in some states also use magenta for enforcement duties.

==== White ====
White lights are used on most newer emergency vehicles, both as an extra color on lightbars and in the form of ‘wig-wag’ headlights.

Many police motor vehicles, and less often other emergency services, also fit LED matrix variable message displays to vehicle lightbars. Such message bars used in New South Wales by the police and fire brigade are capable of displaying numerous messages warning motorists of various hazards or dangers.

=== Austria ===
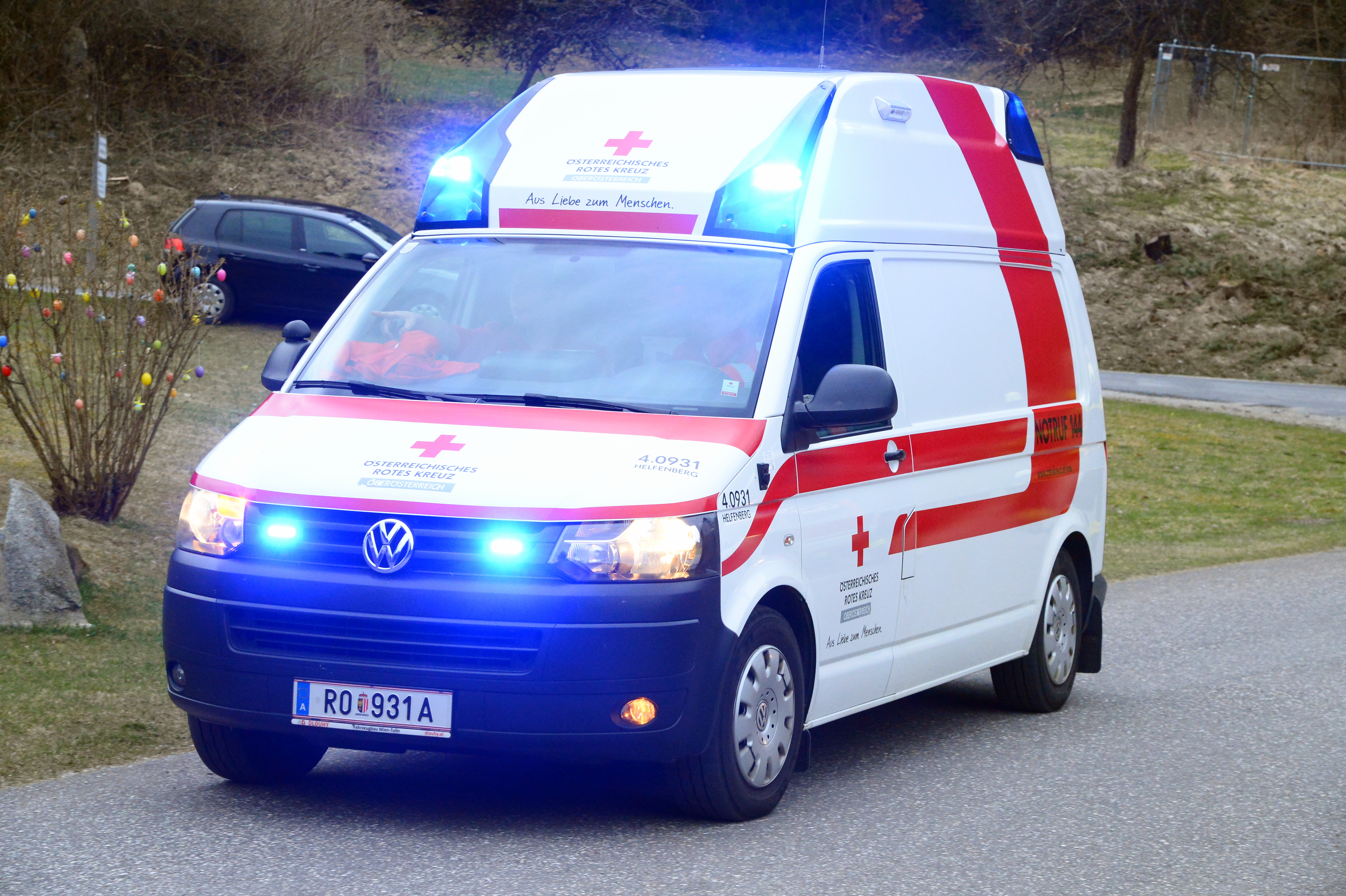
An ambulance of the Austrian Red Cross emitting blue emergency lighting

All emergency vehicles in Austria use blue emergency lights. While strobe and rotating lights used to be the most common types, LEDs have been implemented in most new vehicles. Amber coloured lighting is used as warning lights on vehicles such as construction and garbage collection trucks. Vehicles by electric, gas, and public transport companies (e.g. Wiener Linien and Wiener Netze) often have LEDs that can distribute both blue and amber light depending on their use and appear grey when not in use.

=== Belgium ===
Belgian law prohibits red lights facing forward and therefore emergency vehicles normally only use blue lights (red lights are allowed at the rear). Other agencies and authorities that are permitted to carry blue lights on their service or intervention vehicles include the customs administration, the military police, the service for the removal and destruction of explosive devices, the governors of the provinces, the civil defense service, the security service of the railroad network, Infrabel and utility companies.

=== Bahrain ===
Blue is used for police and fire trucks. Red/red blue combination is used for ambulances. Amber/yellow lights are used for tow trucks, security, or construction vehicles

=== Brunei ===
Blue is used for police, red for ambulances and combination of red and blue for fire trucks. Yellow is used for buses and trucks such as pick ups and tow trucks.

=== Canada ===
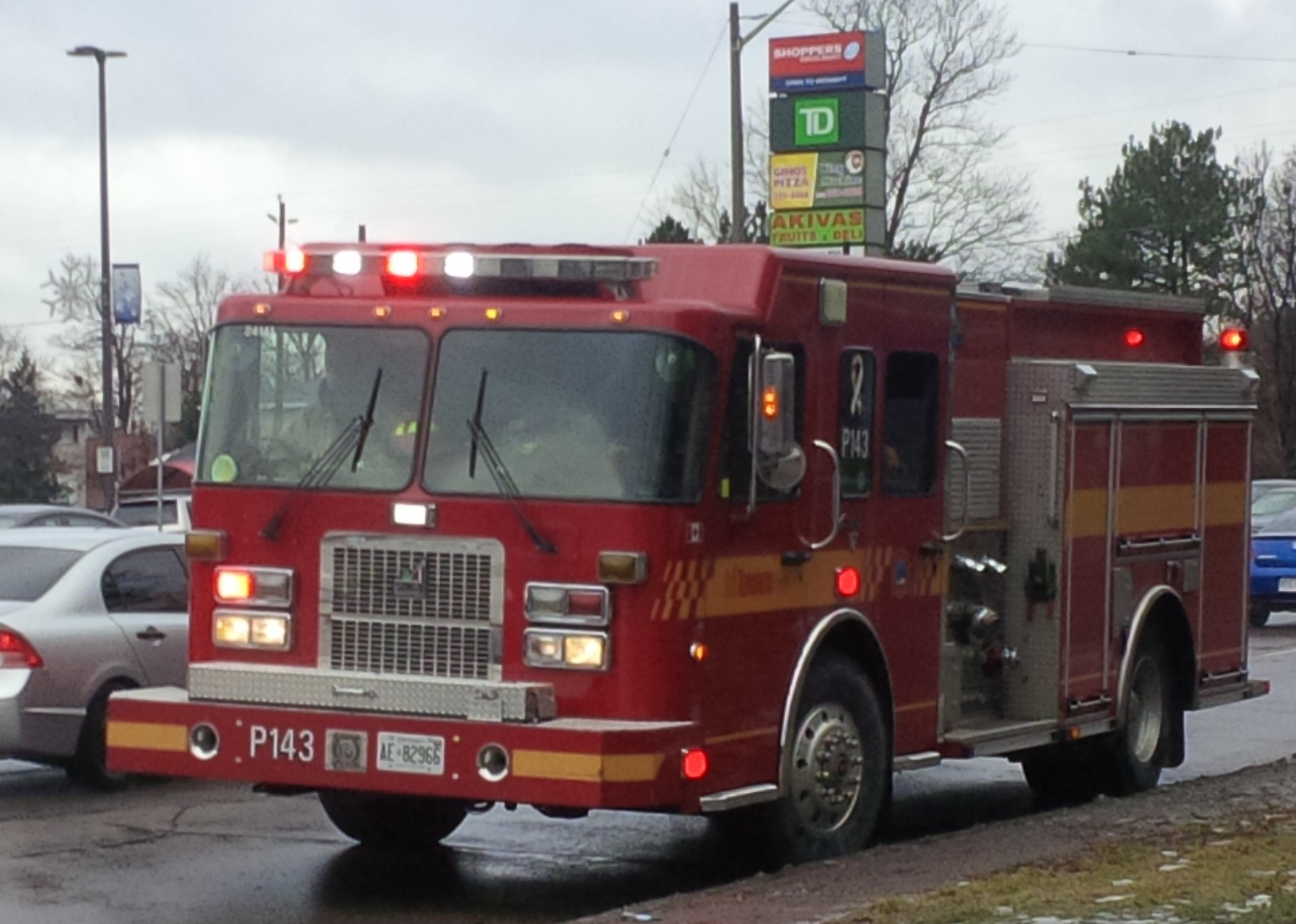
A Toronto Fire truck displays red and white lighting.

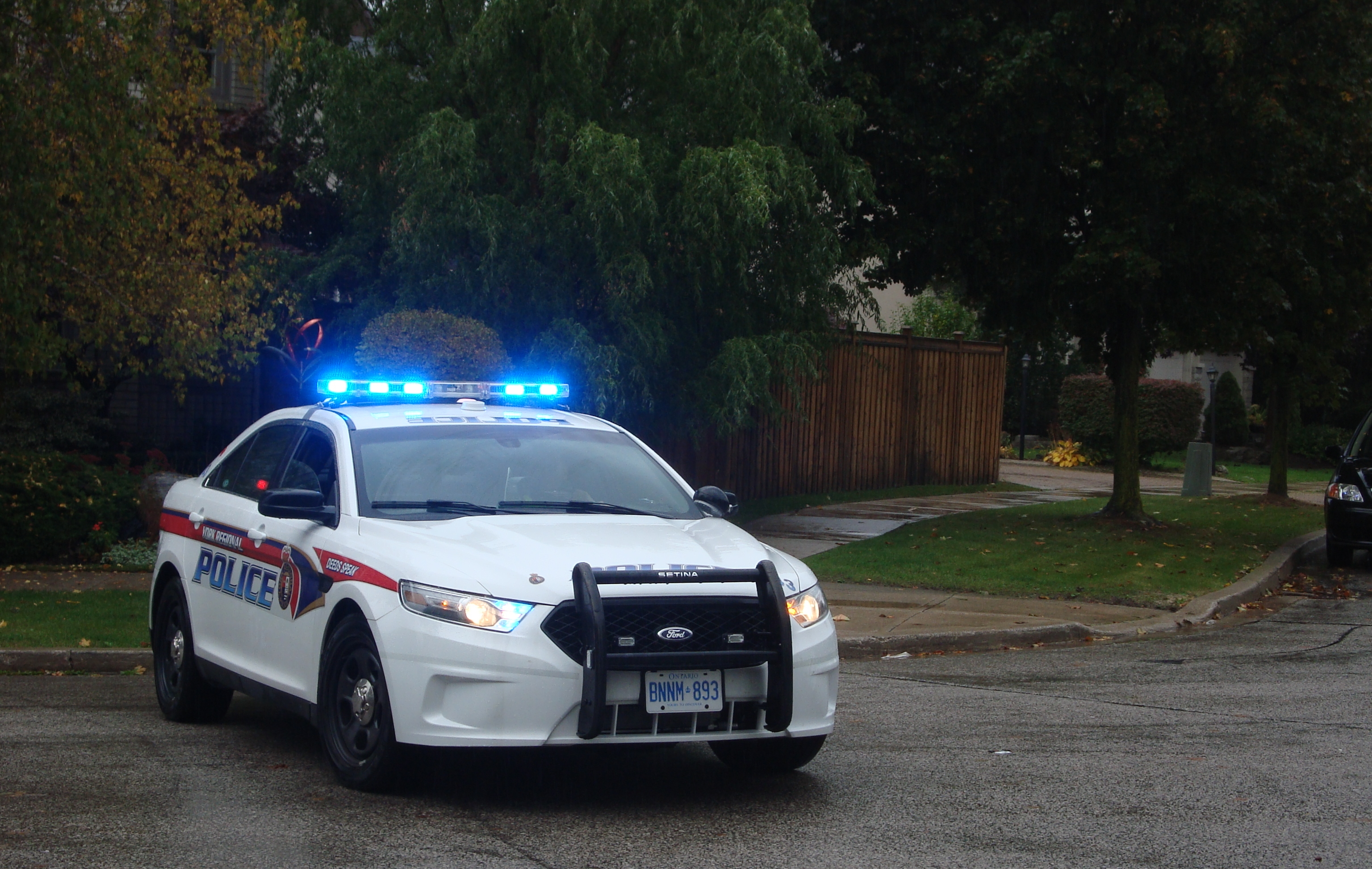
A York Regional Police Ford Taurus using blue lights

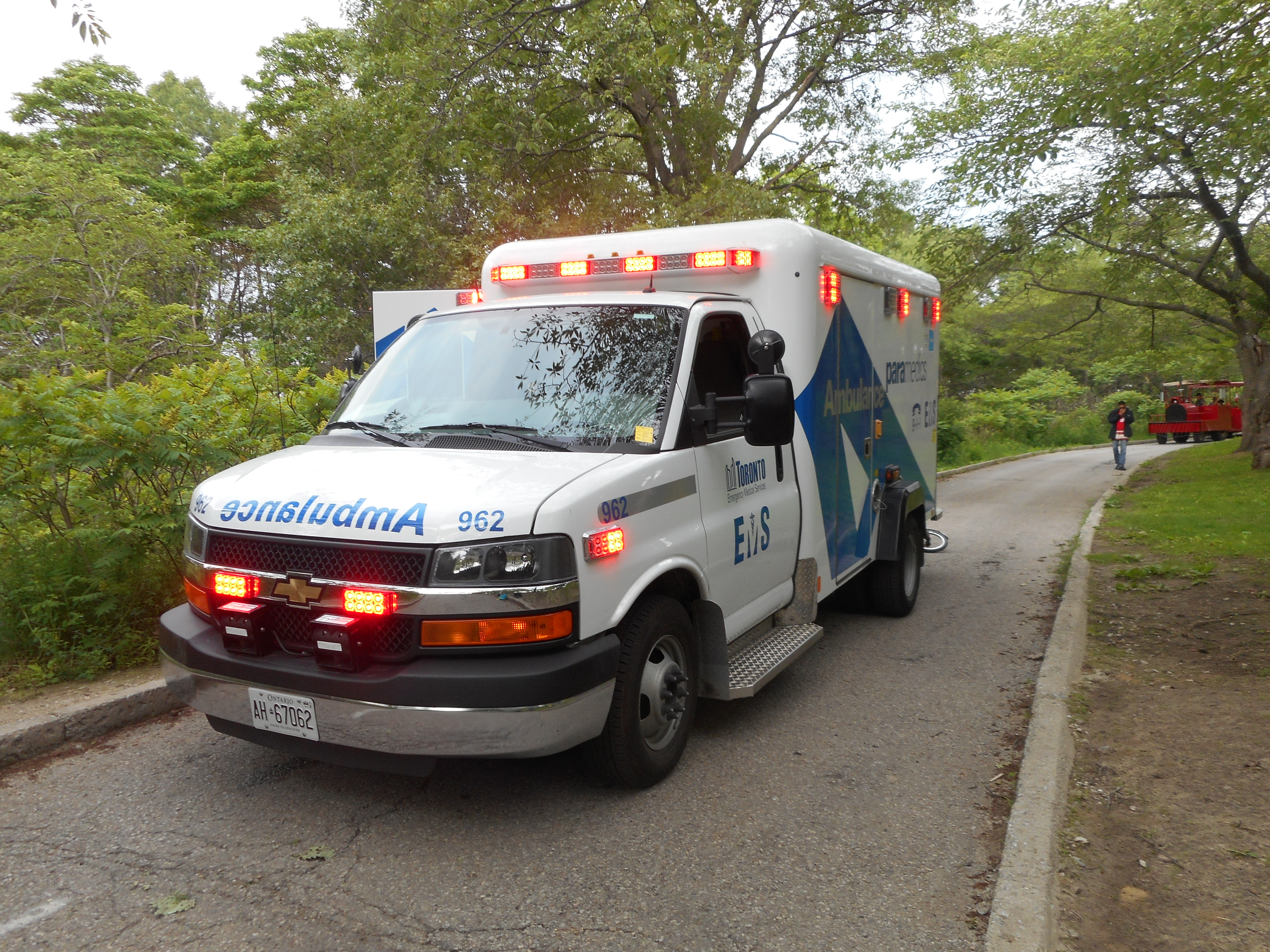
Toronto Paramedic Services ambulance using red lights

Generally, red and white are used for emergency vehicles, amber for parking/bylaw enforcement, construction, utility vehicles, Amber and White for security vehicles, and green or red for volunteer firefighters as per various Provincial legislations. Blue is used, along with red, for Police/Peace officers, as well as for snow removal vehicles in Ontario (with Amber for Municipal snow removal and amber and blue for Saskatchewan, Alberta). Purple is used for a funeral. Police now use both red and blue Canada-wide (except where local laws prohibit), including Ontario (thanks to successful testing in Toronto and Ottawa, and changes in the provincial traffic act), where the color blue was only used for non-emergency work. Blue flashing lights are still permitted on snow removal vehicles in Ontario, as long as they are not used in conjunction with flashing red lights.

Some provinces restrict municipal peace officers (the exact title varies by province) to a different color; for instance, red-only in Québec, and amber in Ontario. However, Ontario does permit certain types of provincial enforcement officers, such as Ministry of Transportation, red lights. Officers appointed to enforce the Highway Traffic Act and other statutes use red or red and blue lights as well, such as Ministry of the Environment, Ministry of Natural Resources, City of Yellowknife Municipal Enforcement Division, Iqaluit Municipal Enforcement Dept, Alberta and Saskatchewan Peace officers, University Constables and others. White flashing lights are common as a supplemental light on emergency vehicles, particularly for fire and ambulance vehicles.

In New Brunswick, Green is reserved for EMO Command post. Volunteer firefighters may receive special license plate size markings (red letters on a yellow background) to be displayed in place of a front license plate, or in the window of said vehicle, however they cannot use any flashing lights on their private vehicles whatsoever.

Manitoba only allows red emergency lights for Volunteer Firefighters' Personally Owned Vehicles, sirens are not permitted. Special personal vehicle Firefighter license plates are also available for those Responders (and retired members) that desire them on a departmental sign-off approval basis by local Fire Departments and through Manitoba Public Insurance (MPI). Firefighters' Personally Owned Vehicles are considered as emergency vehicles under Manitoba Law, and may break normal traffic and road rules, and disregard traffic and road signs, like speed limits, red traffic lights, etc. Traffic must pull over for a personally owned volunteer fire vehicle with red lights flashing.

Saskatchewan allows red lights with sirens or red and blue lights with sirens for the Personally Owned Vehicles of firefighters and emergency medical first responders. They may receive authorization to do so if their local municipality created a local bylaw that permits the use of red lights with sirens or red and blue lights with sirens in Firefighters' Personally Owned Vehicles. Firefighters or emergency medical first responders who are permitted to use red lights with sirens or red and blue lights with sirens in their personal vehicles must undergo a special training course called the SEVO (Saskatchewan Emergency Vehicle Operator's) course. Firefighters or medical responders' Personally Owned Vehicles are treated as emergency vehicles under Saskatchewan law, meaning that they can disregard, ignore, violate, and break normal traffic and road rules and signs, such as exceeding the speed limit, driving on the wrong side of the road, going past a red traffic signal, etc. Traffic must pull to the right and stop for a personally owned volunteer fire or medical responder's vehicle.

Quebec allows red for off-road vehicles used within an off-road trail by trails security officers.

Utility vehicles generally use amber. Ontario and Newfoundland use blue lights for snowplows, while Alberta uses amber and red for snowplows, and has a public awareness campaign advising motorists that “flashing amber and red means snowplow ahead”. Alberta also allows red lights on certain classes of utility vehicles, such as natural gas utilities which may need to disconnect a gas line in an emergency.

While funeral vehicles may also use amber, more recently, some funeral vehicles in Ontario, and more recently Alberta; have begun using purple lights for identification. Often, as a courtesy, motorists yield to funeral processions. However, they are not required to by law.

After a successful one year pilot project in Alberta, in which an exemption allowed for the use of blue lights for tow truck operators (and related roadside support vehicles), the Alberta Department of Transportation further extended the exemption that allows for the use of blue lights on tow trucks for another 5 years, until February 29, 2028. Tow truck & support vehicle operators employing blue flashing lights must install and operate them in tandem with flashing amber lights, blue lights alone may not be used. The flashing blue lights may only be used when stopped.

- Red and blue: police; and ‘other non-police law enforcement’ (Note: ‘Other non-police law enforcement’ refers to entities such as Conservation Officers, Environmental Officers, Provincial Officers, Ministry/Department of Transportation Enforcement Officers, University Constables, Community Peace Officers, and in some cases, Municipal By-law Enforcement Officers and Fuel Tax Enforcement Officers) in all provinces and territories.
- Red: Fire Department, Volunteer FD responders in certain Provinces (Manitoba, Prince Edward Island, Saskatchewan); other non-police law enforcement in the provinces of ON and QC and search and rescue vehicles in BC.
- Red and white: Emergency Medical Services, St. John Ambulance and private ambulatory services; police services that have not changed over to Red and blue
- Blue: Public works vehicles in Newfoundland and Labrador
- Amber and blue: snow plows - Manitoba and Ontario (see TAC Snow Removal Equipment Visibility Guide - July 2015 ISBN 978-1-55187-574-3). Stationary tow trucks & roadside support vehicles - Alberta.
- Amber: construction and utility; funeral homes; semi-trucks amber marker lights and semi-trucks with big and long trailers; airport service vehicles (excludes emergency vehicles); private snow removal vehicles (Ontario); Canadian Automobile Association Emergency Assistance vehicles; snow removal (Nova Scotia).
- White: Certain railroad-related machines, like fueling tankers, locomotive fuelling service-stations, track maintenance and switching engines, may also use a flashing white light.
- Purple: funeral processions - British Columbia, Ontario, Quebec, Alberta, Manitoba, Nova Scotia, Newfoundland and Labrador, and Prince Edward Island.
- Green: is now being used by security agencies. It is also being used by emergency service volunteers in certain provinces (including St. John Ambulance in Ontario). Green may also be used by stopped Emergency Vehicles to denote a command vehicle or the site commander, New Brunswick EMO Command post. Volunteer Fire Fighters (Ontario, Quebec, Alberta).
- White/clear: mall security (Ontario); university campus security (Ontario)

=== Chile ===
According to CONASET (Comisión Nacional de Seguridad del Tránsito) regulations, all emergency vehicles in Chile must be outfitted with emergency lighting, both to identify the agency they belong to and to use their right of traffic in specific situations. Some non-emergency or law enforcement vehicles are also permitted to use special lighting equipment but only during transportation or normal operations.

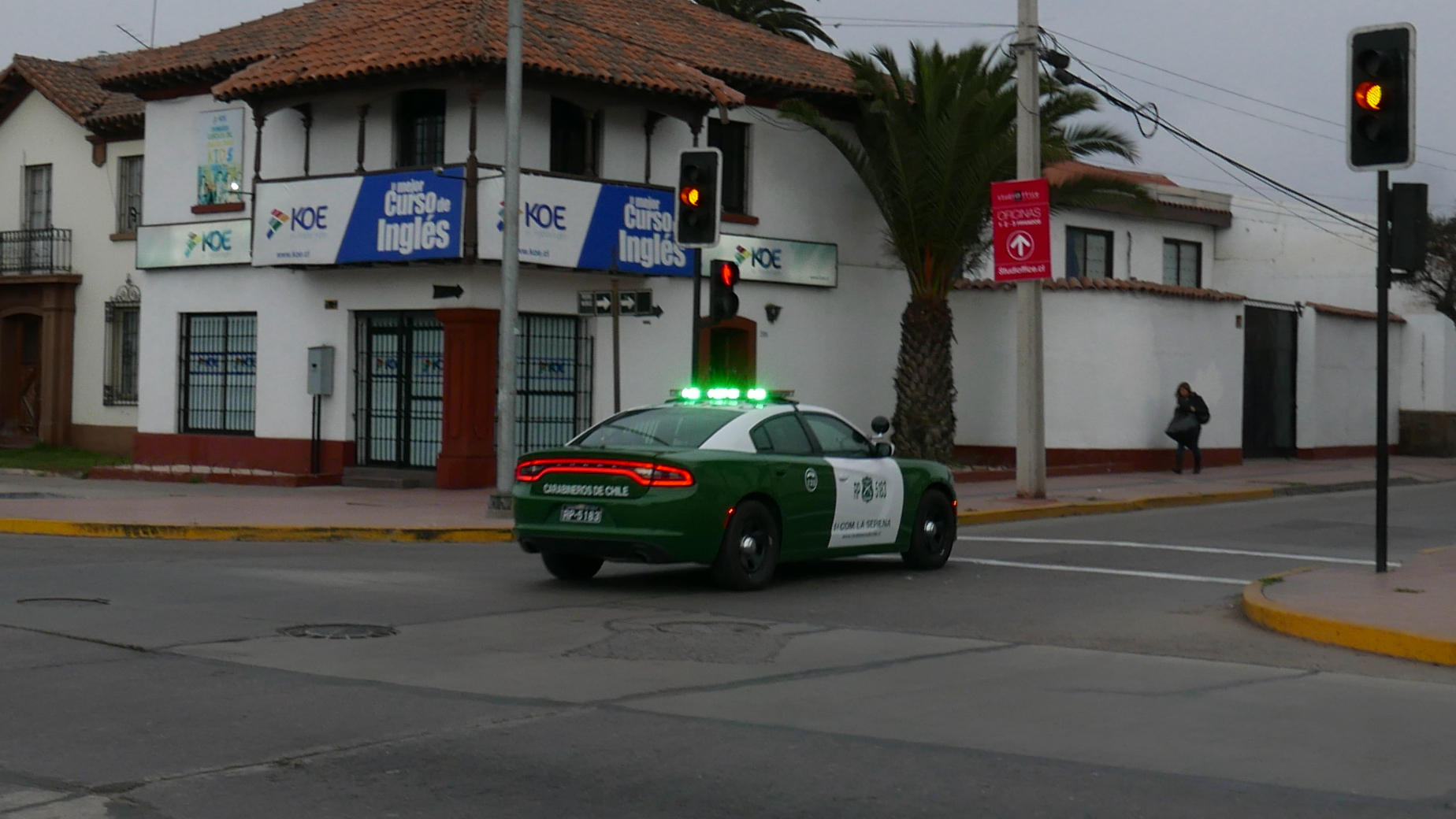
A Carabineros de Chile Charger with green lights

- Red: Historically used by Carabineros de Chile as their main color for emergency lighting. Since 2018, it is being phased out as the main color for police vehicles and it is mostly used by fire trucks and older ambulances.
- Green: Used by firefighter departments in cities like Santiago, Rancagua, etc. Also used by Gendarmeria de Chile for their prisoner transport vehicles.
- Amber: Non-emergency vehicles like school Buses, tow trucks, forklifts and construction equipment. Under current regulations, these are the only approved civilian uses if not used with other combined light colors. Some restored and or newer firefighting trucks also carry wig-wag or support lighting equipment in this color. Municipal patrol/community outreach vehicles tend to also use this color if equipped with lightbars.
- Blue: Used mainly by Policia de Investigaciones de Chile as their main lighting color on their vehicles. Fire-fighting equipment imported from European fire brigades (mainly Germany) also uses blue lighting.
- Red and Blue: Ambulances working with local hospitals and SAMU services. Firetrucks also use combined lightbars on this set of colors. Patient transport vehicles working with hospitals and private clinics are authorized to use LED-type stripes on their windshields but no roof mounted equipment.
- Red and Green: The current combination used by Carabineros on their newer patrol vehicles. Red is used as a main color during emergency procedures, prisoner transport and other situations that might warrant its usage. Green is used during routine patrol situations or routine incident patrols or traffic control.
- Red, White, Green: Alternate set of patterns used by Carabineros on emergency situations, like high-speed pursuits.
- Blue and Amber: Color pattern sometimes used by municipal guards or community outreach programs in cities like Puerto Montt.
- White and Green: Used by Carabineros on patrol bicycles used in urban and beach settings.

=== China ===
- Red and Blue: Fire department, some ambulance vehicles, most police vehicles.
- Red: Police motorcycles, some police vehicles, volunteer firefighters, railway company, Red Cross Society of China, local government.
- Amber: Construction/repair/road cleaning vehicles, snow plows, highway maintenance vehicles, electric power company, slow-going, gas supplier, security company.
- Blue: ambulance vehicles.

=== Colombia ===
Under Colombian law, emergency vehicles are authorized to use lights and siren to demand priority in traffic. However, rather unusually, it is not specified what types of lights and sirens can be used. Since emergency vehicles are usually imported from other parts of the world, one can see a great variety of light colors and siren types in Colombia. Since most law enforcement duties are consolidated in the National Police, there is some uniformity in police vehicles. Until the early 1990s, these police vehicles were equipped with yellow lights, although today they are equipped with a single red and blue LED lightbar on the roof, and sometimes supplementary red, white, and blue grille lights. Other, more minor law enforcement vehicles (Military Police, CTI, UNP) generally follow the same scheme.

Fire trucks are generally imported from the US, and therefore primarily use red lights although European-style fire trucks with blue lights can sometimes be seen and, more rarely, yellow lights as in Spain.

Like the US, ambulance service in Colombia is often contracted out to private companies, and some hospitals operate their own ambulance services. These different services outfit their vehicles differently, so there is little uniformity. Also, many ambulances are imported from other countries and retain the lighting schemes of their country of origin. Most ambulances use red or red and white light combinations. However, ambulances operated by the National Police and the Army are equipped with red and blue lights. Some ambulances can be seen with green lights, meaning they were imported from Argentina where ambulances always use green lights. Others still can be seen with yellow lights, like in Spain.

As in most of the world, utility vehicles usually use flashing yellow/amber lights.

Although only emergency and utility vehicles are allowed to display flashing colored lights, this law is usually not enforced and it is common to see private vehicles customized with colored lights. Taxis commonly display flashing blue lights as decoration, although some taxi drivers install sirens onto their vehicles in order to get around traffic. Many busetas (the traditional, unregulated bus systems in many urban areas) and chivas (rural, informal, public buses) also display colorful flashing lights.

=== Czech Republic ===
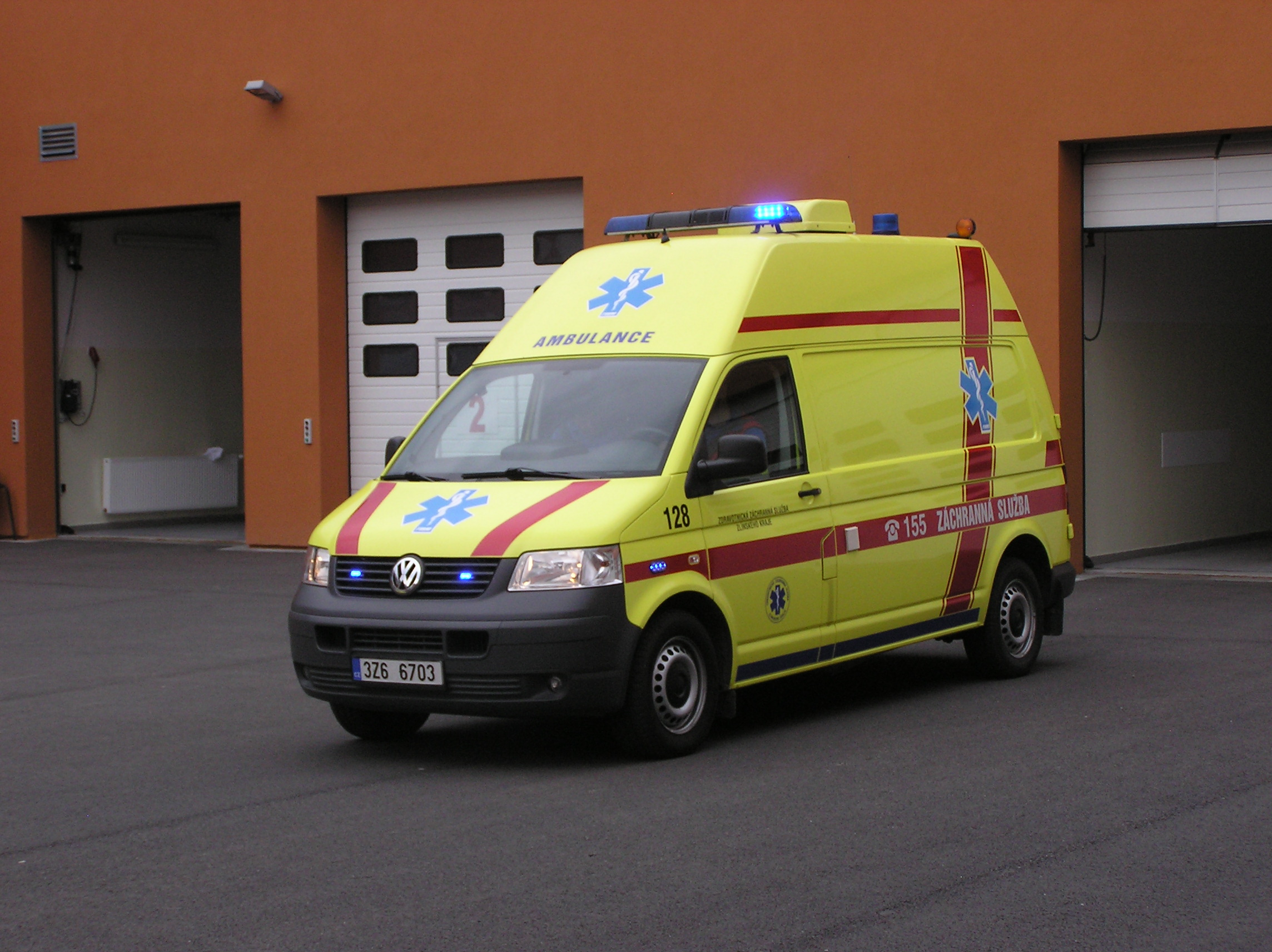
Ambulance in Zlín, Czech Republic, With blue LED lights

Emergency vehicles are permitted to display blue or combination of blue and red emergency lights and an audible warning signal (such as a siren) pursuant to § 41 of Act No. 361/2000, which grants them the ability to ignore certain traffic laws.

Combination of blue and red lights and sirens can be fitted to vehicles classified for primary emergency services, as follows:

- the Ministry of Interior, used by the National police, and identified by special legislation,
- providers of emergency medical services, providers of medical transport services and providers of transport of urgent care patients,
- fire departments, including volunteer departments,

Blue lights and sirens can be fitted on vehicles of:

- the Prison Service,
- military police designated by special legislation,
- the police of Czech National Bank,
- Municipal Police, as determined by municipality,
- mine rescue service,
- gas installation emergency services,
- Armed Forces military rescue units, carrying out civil protection duties,
- the customs administration, as marked by special regulation,
- vehicles of cabinet ministers, president, chairman of the senate, chairman of the chamber of deputies, and
- Intelligence services, transporting of carriers of classified information or persons to whom they provide protection.

Persons driving an emergency vehicle must be 21, and are restricted by law from eating, drinking, or smoking while operating. White flashing lights can be used as a supplementary color in lightbars, and must face forward.

Amber lights are used for non-emergency warning on many different vehicles - e.g. road construction vehicles, heavy transports, tow trucks, and municipal services.

It is illegal to use blue emergency lights or sirens by an unauthorized vehicle on the public way.

Other colors for flashing lights or beacons are not allowed.

The most commonly seen lightning (and siren) equipment comes from Whelen, HOLOMY, Federal Signal and others.

=== France ===
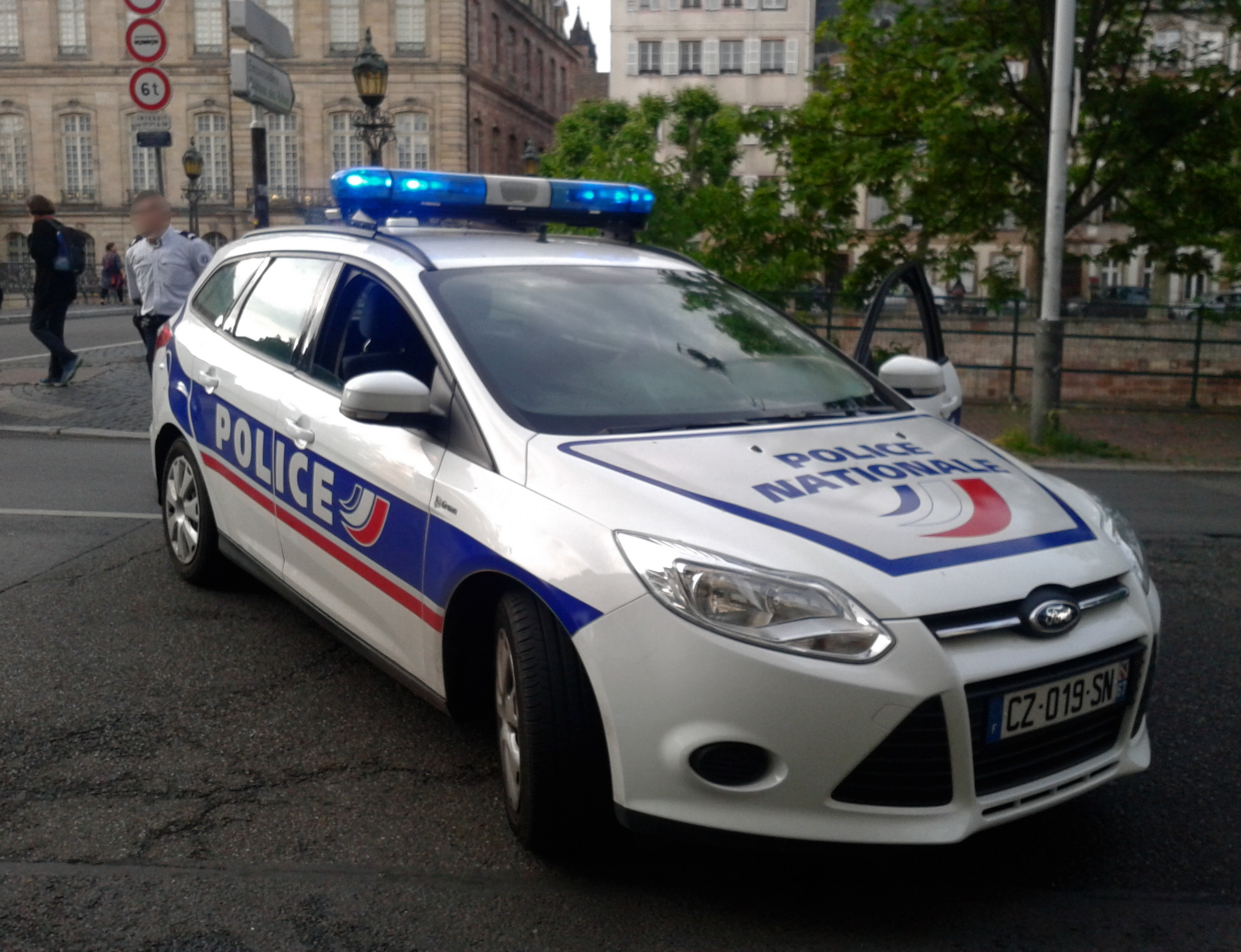
Police Nationale police car with blue lights

==== Blue ====
The main colour for emergency service vehicles is overwhelmingly blue, although there is also widespread use of flashing (white) headlights, and many police vehicles have a set of two rear-facing red flashing lights to indicate that the police car is stopped or to indicate caution.

When responding, emergency vehicles (including Police cars) are required to have, at least, one -360 degrees visible- blue light on the roof. French law strictly states what kind of blue lights and sirens an emergency vehicle can display, with 2 different categories.

- The first category ( priorité de passage = pass priority) includes Fire, local and national Police, Gendarmerie, Customs, Penitentiary service, public EMS (SAMU), private ambulances under SAMU contract and government civil defence. These vehicles must use two-tones sirens and beacons with a rotating effect, and/or lightbars with flashing or rotating effects. They can also use two additional blue, flashing, front-facing lights.
- The second category ( facilité de passage = ease of passage)includes other private ambulances, blood/organ transport, railroad security, snow plows, highway maintenance/safety and electricity/gas units which respond to incidents and Banque de France transport trucks. These vehicles must only use three-tones sirens (except snow plows) and beacons with a flashing effect, and/or lightbars with flashing effects.

French emergency road assist vehicle of the DIRIF (road assistance organisation of the Ile de France) with orange and blue lights

==== Amber ====
For any emergency vehicle, amber lights can be used with or without blue, to warn other drivers the emergency vehicle is stopped or slow. Non-emergency vehicles allowed to use amber include agricultural, construction, utility, oversized and oversized escort vehicle, tow and airport vehicles. French emergency vehicles can also be equipped with BLR (barre lumineuse de redirection = traffic advisor) with light going from left to right, from riight to left or from the center toward the sides. But only Police, gendarmerie and certain other services can used them. Fire, ambulance, civil security association, ... cant used this dirrectional trafic advisor and can just be equipped with regualar amber flash to inform their presence to the incomming traffic.

==== Green or red ====
These are not considered emergency lights, but are often used on the roof of command vehicles at the scene of incidents. In case of a soprtive road sporting event, organisation and safety vehicle are authorized to be equipped with a red rotating beacon or red emergency lights (tour de france, ...). Presidential escort and security vehicle cand also be equipped with blue and red lights.

=== Germany ===
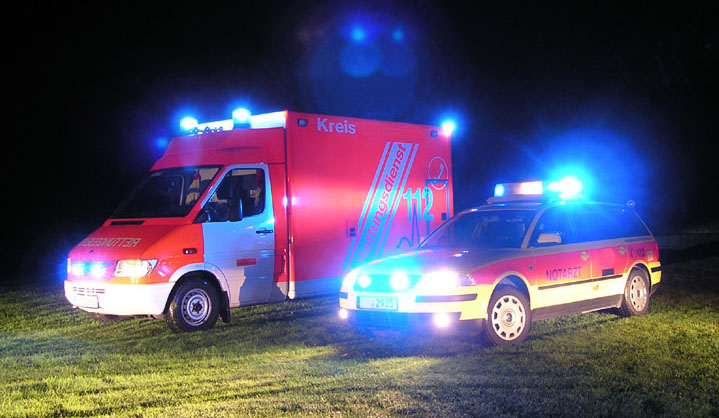
German emergency vehicles (all blue beacons)

Only emergency and police vehicle may use blue lights. This includes firefighters, rescue services, emergency response vehicles for public utilities and civil defense units. All other kinds of blue lights (e.g. car floor lighting or cab interior lights), including reflective stickers or paintings, are illegal on public roads. Flashing blue lights and two-tone horns may only be used by authorized vehicles in case of emergency and order all other vehicles to make way, since these vehicles have the absolute right of way. Blue lights alone may be used to secure the site of an accident (or a standing emergency vehicle). Sometimes, columns of emergency or police vehicles use blue lights (without the two-tone horns) to make the column more visible to other vehicles.

Blue and yellow are the only colours of flashing lights legal for use on moving vehicles. Other colours, such as red or green are sometimes used to show vehicles of special functions, such as incident command, when stationary.

German police lightbars often have ‘POLIZEI’ written in white over the dome, and usually incorporate an LED text display that can read, in mirrored writing if towards the front, ‘HALT POLIZEI’ or ‘BITTE FOLGEN’ (‘please follow’), to signal drivers to pull over. In the newest generation, the text display changes between German and English (HALT POLIZEI → STOP POLICE and BITTE FOLGEN → FOLLOW ME).

=== Greece ===
Police used to have blue-colored emergency lights but after a recent restock of vehicles, now the use of both blue and red color is usual. Fire Departments make use of red only emergency light while ambulances either use red or both colors. Regulation also states that the Military as well as vehicles carrying politicians can make use of a single rotating blue light at the roof. Every other individual and/or company may use yellow lights for either warning or emergency. Special groups like Emergency Response teams and agents may also include emergency lights on their private vehicles in case of an emergency when not in active duty. All utility vehicles such as construction related, tow trucks must be equipped with a yellow-colored emergency light bar on the top, clearly visible from the front and rear side. The same applies for private security firm vehicles, that are in generally treated like typical private cars.

=== Hong Kong ===
Under Hong Kong Law, Chapter 374G of the Road Traffic (Traffic Control) Regulations: Section 46 Giving way to animals, police vehicles, ambulances, etc., drivers must yield to vehicles which are sounding siren and/or flashing light bars.

- Red and blue: Hong Kong Police Force
- Red only: Hong Kong Fire Services Department (except ambulance and EMS vehicles)
- Blue only: Ambulances and other EMS vehicles, whether operated by Fire Services Department, Auxiliary Medical Services, or Hong Kong St. John Ambulance; Customs and Excise Department, Hong Kong Correctional Services
- Amber only: Utility vehicles, Civil Aid Service, all vehicles in the air-side of the airport (for pilots' visibility), Hong Kong Immigration Department vehicles, Public Facilities Cleaning vehicles, Road engineer vehicles

=== Hungary ===
==== Blue lights only ====
These are used by police, ambulance service, emergency blood transport, fire brigade, emergency response teams (public services), correction facilities.

==== Blue and red ====
Used on most police and ambulance, and on some types of fire vehicles, but red is to be used only in combo with blue. Ambulances usually have large integrated roof corner flash lights, 3 blue ones and 1 red at front right position, and 3-5 or more smaller red/blue flash lights on mirrors, hood, grille, side and back, mounted and used in a zig-zag pattern. Separately-mounted external lightbars on ambulances are rare, used just on doctor's cars and older vans. Police cruisers usually have a lightbar similar to that of German units (Hella 3) with red and blue lights (red on right, like on ambulances), a blue flash behind the windscreen, and additional blue flash lights in the grille. Since Dec 2017, new police lightbars feature integrated LED matrix to display messages to front (mirrored) and rear, alternatively changing text in Hungarian and English. Some police units often use additional lighting, e.g. strobe lights, alternating headlight flash, behind-windshield blue/red lights. Detachable blue flash lamps are occasionally used by unmarked cars of special police forces, by personal transport services for government members, and diplomatic convoy/escort vehicles.

==== Amber ====
Amber or yellow flashing lights and lightbars are for warning some special attribute (e.g. oversized, slow, parking at unexpected places etc.) of vehicles like garbage trucks, road cleaning/control/repair, snow plow, car assistance services, construction, transporting dangerous materials etc. Amber/yellow lights do not grant traffic privileges, except to go in the opposite direction in one-way streets or driving on the opposite side in some cases, e.g. road cleaning.

=== Indonesia ===
Under the Indonesian Legislation number 22, year of 2009, section 59 the colors and users of lightbars are:

- Blue: Indonesian National Police and escort units
- Green: Municipal Police (Indonesia)
- Blue and Red: used by certain Ambulances
- Red: Ambulance, fire brigade, Hearse, Indonesian Red Cross Society, Indonesian National Armed Forces escort, and Search & Rescue units
- Amber: Tow Trucks, Special Freight Vehicles (Flammable cargo, Heavy and long vehicles, oversized vehicle and their pilot vehicles), Public Facilities Cleaning vehicles, Road engineer vehicles, and highway maintenance vehicles

=== Ireland ===
A Dublin Fire Brigade ambulance responding with flashing blue lights

==== Blue lights ====
Usage of emergency vehicle lighting is restricted in Ireland through the Road Traffic Lighting of Vehicles (Blue and Amber Lamps) Regulations 2020.

The main colour for emergency service vehicles is overwhelmingly blue, although there is also widespread use of flashing (white) headlights, and many police vehicles have a set of two rear-facing red flashing lights to indicate that the police car is stopped or to indicate caution.

The use of blue lights not exceeding 50w are limited to vehicles being used:

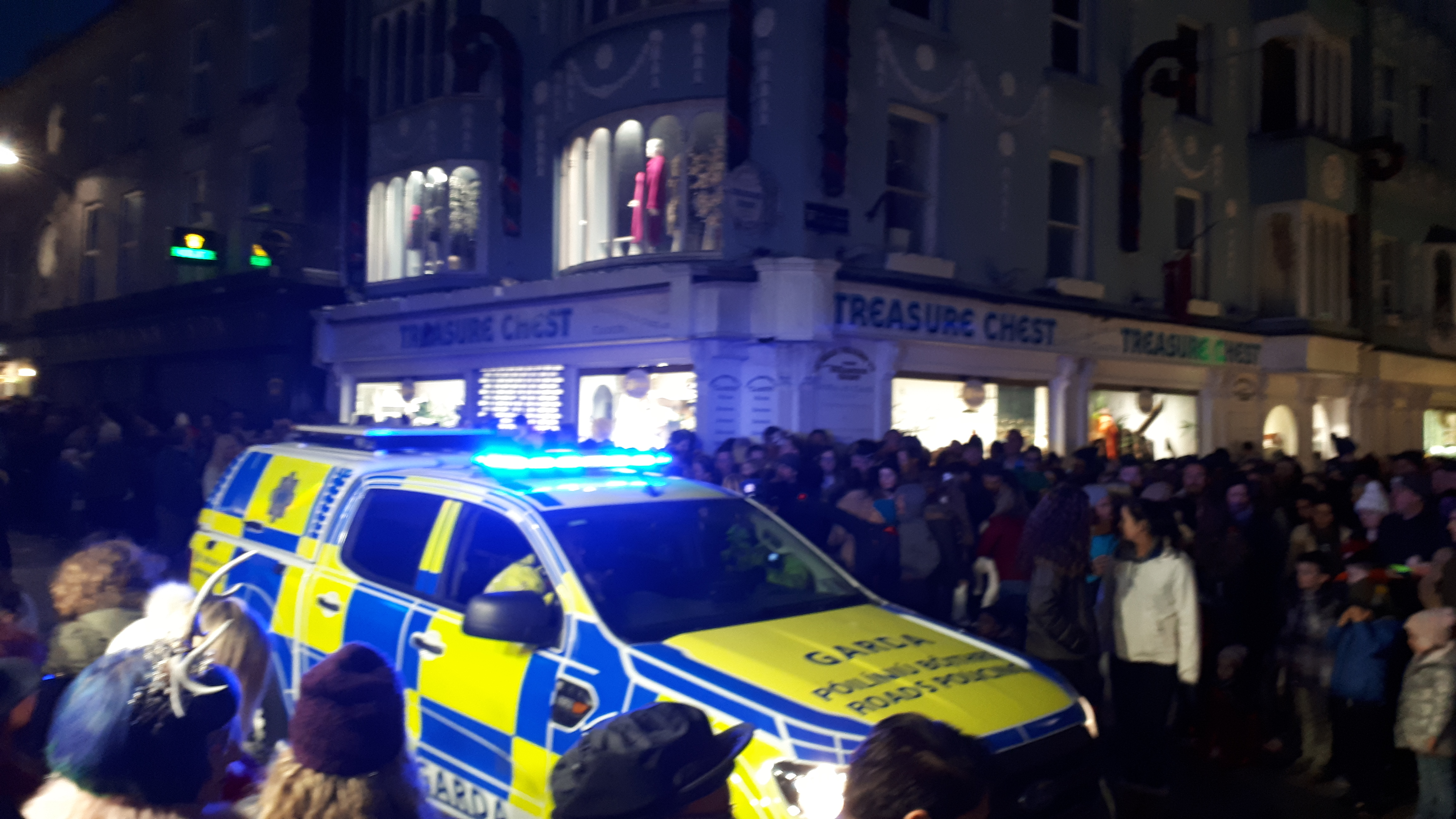
Blue lights in use on a Garda Roads Policing vehicle

- by a member of the Garda Síochána in the performance of his or her duties;
- by a pre-hospital emergency care service provider, recognised by the Pre-Hospital Emergency Care Council established by the Pre-Hospital Emergency Care Council (Establishment) Order 2000 ( S.I. No. 109 of 2000 ), in the provision of an ambulance service;
- by a prison officer of the Irish Prison Service in the performance of his or her duties, provided that, at the time it is used, the vehicle is registered by the Irish Prison Service under section 131 of the Finance Act 1992;
- by a fire authority, within the meaning of the Fire Services Act 1981 (No. 30 of 1981), as a fire brigade vehicle, including a vehicle used by a senior fire officer (being a fire officer not below the grade of Assistant Fire Officer (Prevention) but including the grades of Second Officer and Third Officer) in the performance of his or her duties as such an officer;
- by a member of the Irish Coast Guard in the performance of his or her duties, provided that the vehicle, which may be used with or without a trailer, is at the time it is used registered by the Irish Coast Guard under section 131 of the Finance Act 1992;
- by a member of the Military Police Corps in the performance of his or her duties, provided that the vehicle is marked as a Military Police Corps vehicle and, at the time it is used, is registered by the Minister for Defence under section 131 of the Finance Act 1992;
- for the delivery or collection of human transplant organs, human blood or human blood products.

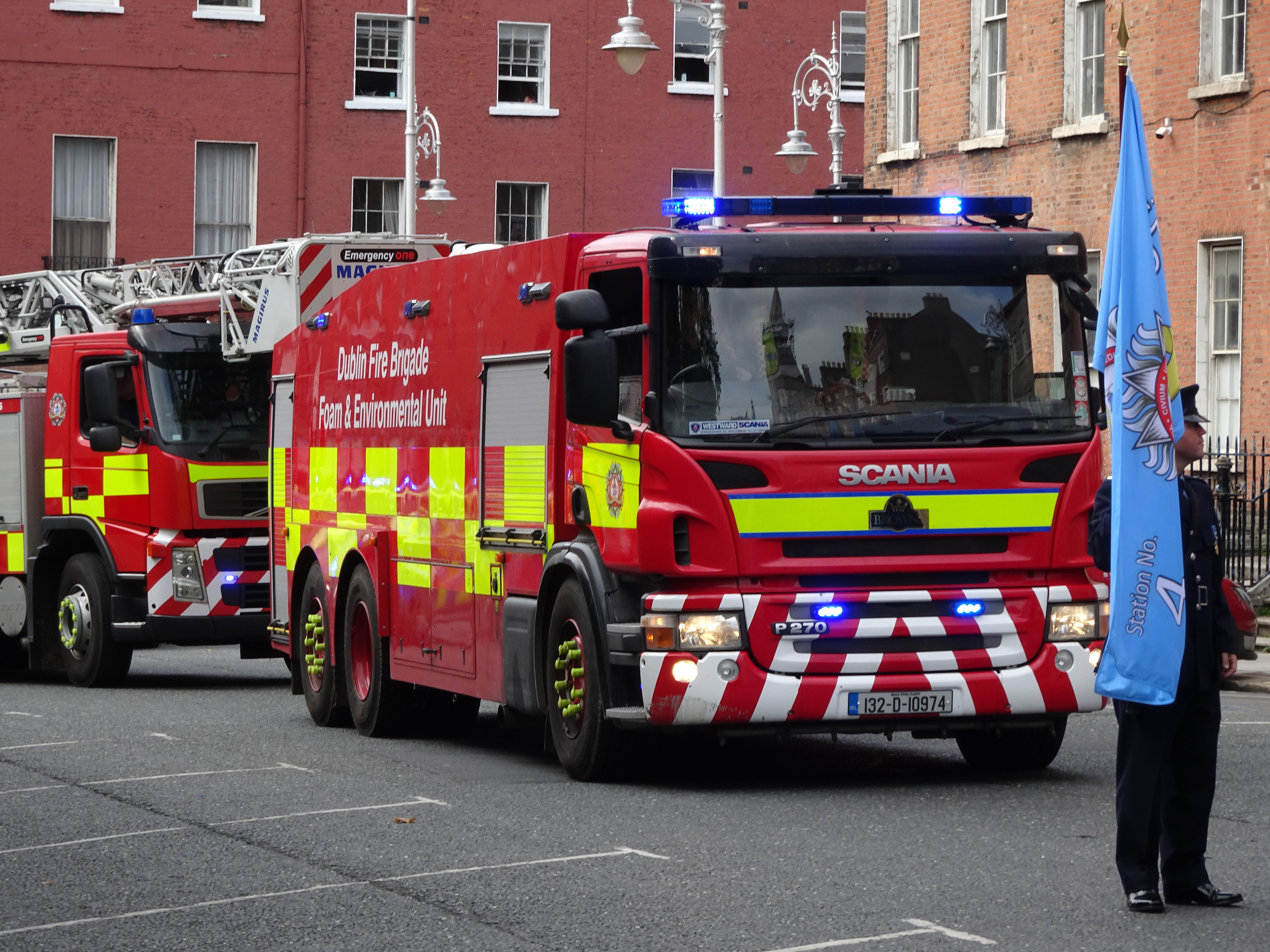
Dublin Fire Brigade Foam and Environmental Unit with blue flashing led lights

Although not specifically linked to the use of warning beacons, the police, fire brigade and ambulance services (but not the other emergency services listed above) may also choose to allow their drivers to claim legal exemptions from most motoring regulations, such as being able to treat a red traffic light as a give way sign, exceeding the speed limit, passing the wrong side of a keep left/right sign, or parking in restricted areas.

No qualification other than a driving licence is legally required to use blue lights. However most organisations will insist that their drivers are trained in emergency driving techniques. In 2014 the Emergency Services Driving Standard was launched with the backing of all major emergency services.

==== Sirens ====
The right for emergency vehicles in Ireland to use sirens is regulated by the Road Traffic (Requirement to have Audible Warning Devices on Vehicles) Regulations 2011.

The following vehicles may be permitted to use a siren:

"(a) by a member of the Garda Síochána in the performance of his or her duties,

"(b) as a fire brigade vehicle,

"(c) by persons providing an ambulance service,

"(d) by the Irish Prison Service,

"(e) as an Irish Coast Guard vehicle, with or without a trailer, or,

"(f) for the delivery or collection of human transplant organs, human blood or human blood products,

"(g) as a Marked Military Police Vehicle"

==== Amber lights ====
Amber lights grant no priority in traffic and exist purely to advertise the vehicle's presence.

The following vehicles may use amber flashing lights on public roads:

- as a breakdown vehicle for towing broken-down mechanically propelled vehicles, trailers or semi-trailers to the nearest convenient place of safety or repair and includes a vehicle used in connection with and in the immediate vicinity of a breakdown;
- as a road-clearance vehicle;
- as a road-works vehicle in connection with the construction, maintenance and improvement of roads or in connection with the provision and maintenance of water supplies, sewerage and drainage services;
- by a local authority (within the meaning of the Local Government Act 2001 ) or other person authorised by a local authority in the collection and disposal of refuse;
- in the provision or maintenance of telephone services or of gas or electricity supply;
- as a Customs and Excise patrol vehicle by an official of Customs and Excise in the performance of his or her duties as such official; or
- as an agricultural tractor or self-propelled agricultural machine (except vintage agricultural tractors used solely for vintage rallies or display).

An amber flashing beacon is compulsory for any vehicle running 'Airside' on any airport. Any vehicle not so fitted, such as an ambulance responding to a medical emergency on an aircraft, has to be accompanied by one so fitted.

=== India ===
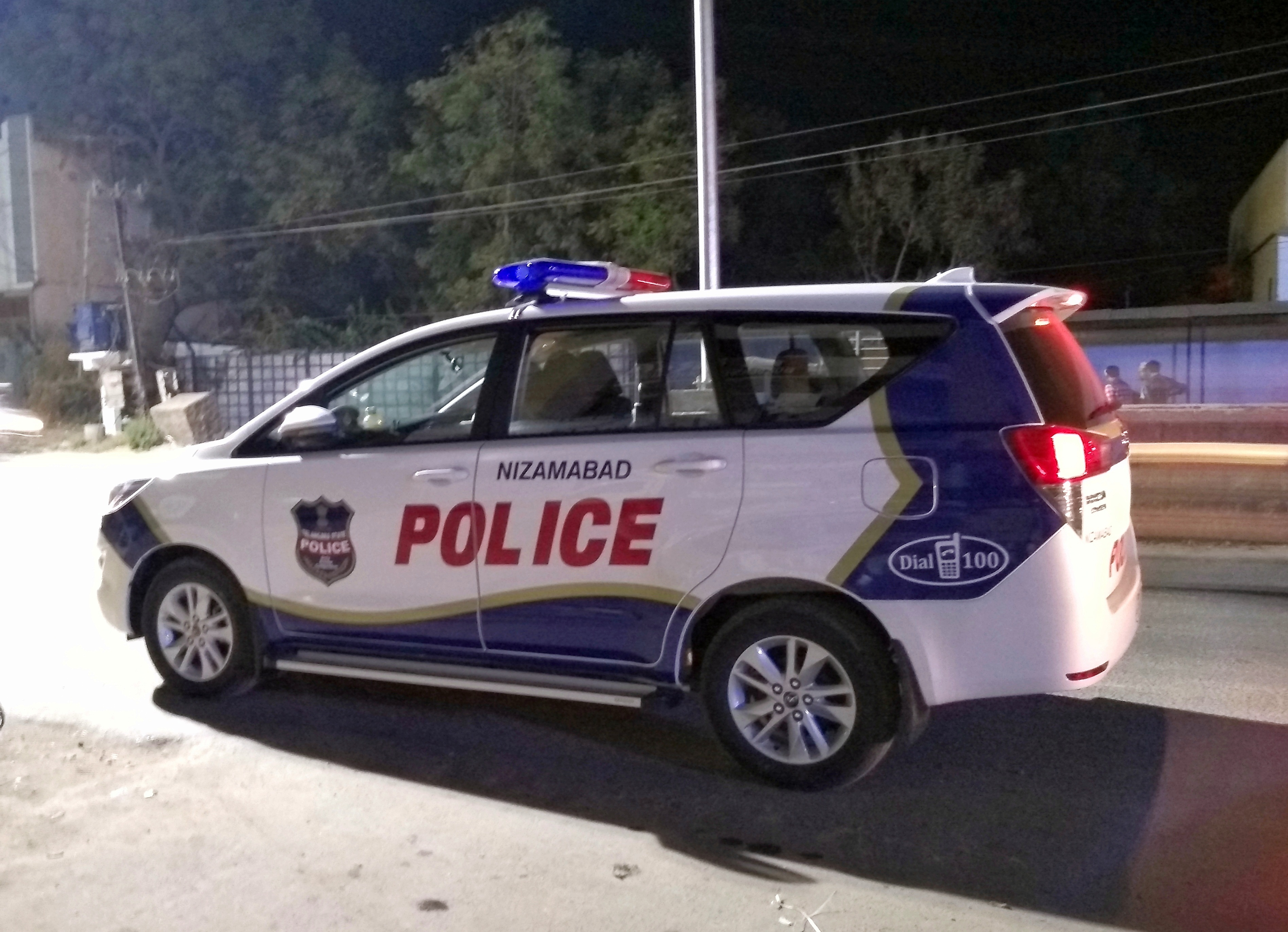
Toyota Innova Crista patrolling car with multi-colored lights by Telangana State Police

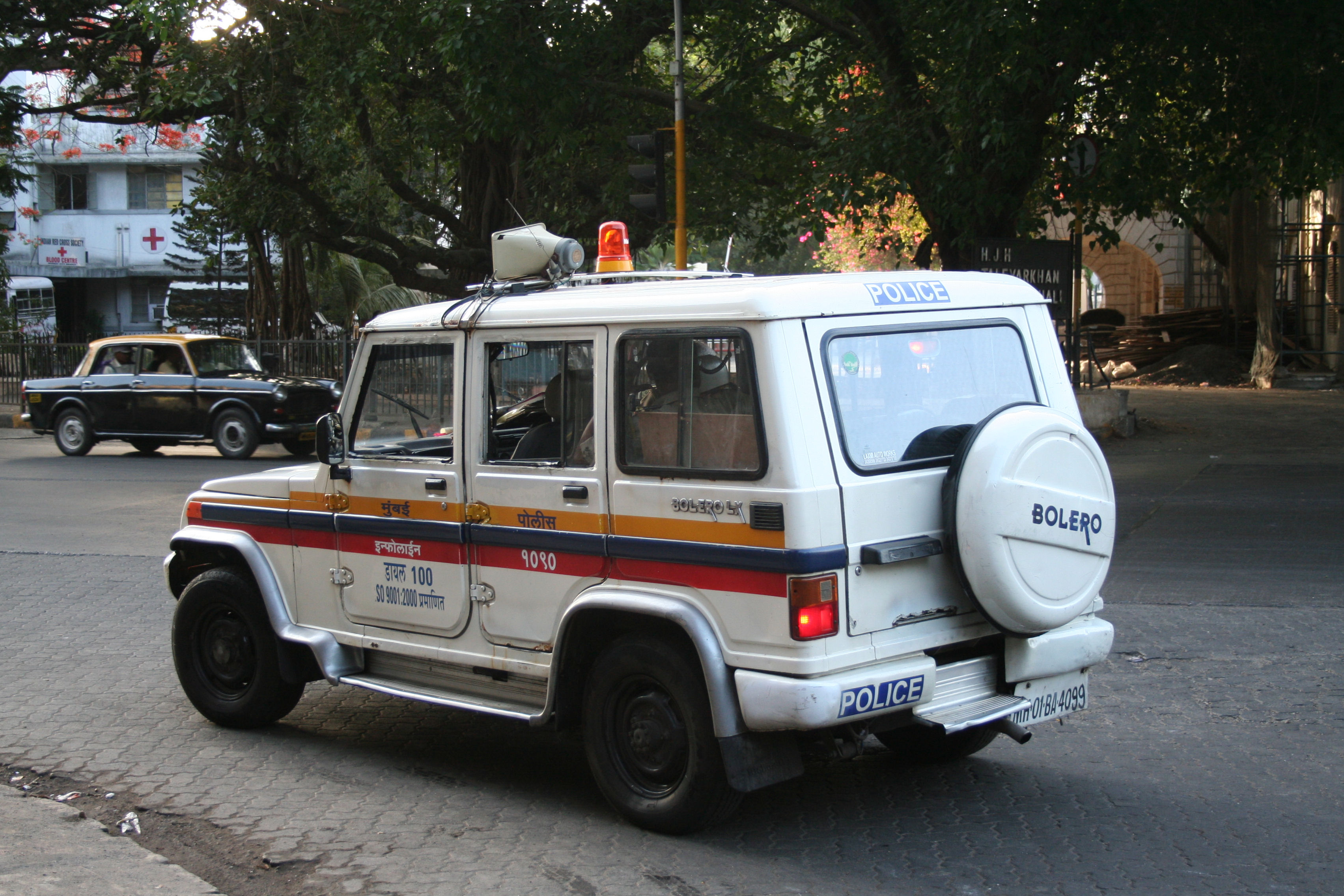
A Mumbai Police Mahindra Bolero patrol vehicle with amber lights and sirens

In 2017, the Supreme Court of India issued a ban on the use of all types of beacon lights on vehicles, except for emergency services such as ambulances, fire trucks, and police vehicles, which can use multi-colored lights on vehicles. The reason behind this ruling was that the use of beacon lights had become a symbol of status in the country, leading to reckless driving and an increase in accidents. Since 2017, sirens and red or blue flashing lights on VIP vehicles across the country have been banned in India, including those of the President, Vice President and Prime Minister. Earlier, red or blue beacon lights were used on VIP vehicles across the country, including by the president, vice president, prime minister, governors, chief ministers, and bureaucrats.

The Supreme Court of India ruled in favor of restricting the use of red beacon lights in December 2013 and asked the Central Government to amend the Motor Vehicle act accordingly, and the Government decided to remove beacon lights from all vehicles except emergency services. As per the notification of Ministry of Road Transport and Highways (MoRTH), the use of these multi-coloured beacon lights is limited to emergency situations or when performing official duty. The vehicles that are allowed to use these multi-coloured lights include police vehicles used for the purpose of maintenance of law and order and emergency; vehicles used by fire and rescue department; ambulances, and other vehicles used for disaster management duties including Earthquake, Landslide, Flood, Cyclone, Tsunami and manmade disasters including nuclear chemical disaster and biological disasters.

- Red: Military Police Vehicles (Indian Naval Police, Army, Airforce Police), Pilot and Escort Vehicles, VVIP Security, Fire and Rescue
- Red and Blue and White (Multi-colored): Emergency Vehicles on duty (Including Police, Paramilitary Forces, Defence forces, CAPFs), Fire and Rescue Service Vehicles, Ambulances, Duties relating to disaster management (vehicles of Fire and Rescue, NDRF, Civil Defence, SDRFs, etc.) Vehicles on duty for the maintenance of law and order (Police, Paramilitary Forces, etc.). Almost State Police Departments use Multi-colored red, blue and white lights. Some police depts still use Blue beacon lights. Maharashtra State Police use Amber Lights on their police vehicles. As per Indian law only Multicolored (Blue, red, White) lights can be used in police, ambulance, other emergency vehicles. Other Law Enforcement agencies Such as State Excise Departments, State Transport Departments, Forest and wildlife departments use Multi-colored lights on their vehicle while on duty. Recently Government of Kerala granted permission to its State Electricity Department (KSEB) for use of Multi-colored lights on official vehicles.
- Amber: Vehicles in the Airports, Central Industrial Security Force -CISF Vehicles, Construction equipment vehicles, utility vehicles, etc.

=== Italy ===
According to Italian law, only blue or amber lights are allowed as warning lights on vehicles.

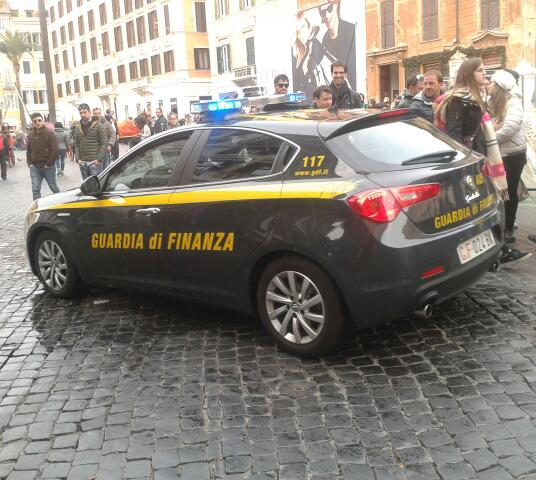
Stationary Guardia di Finanza car on duty in Rome with steady blue lights on

==== Blue lights ====
Blue lights are reserved for emergency vehicles such as the ones used by national and local police, Carabinieri, Guardia di Finanza, ambulances, fire engines, and government VIPs on duty.

==== Sirens ====
According to Italian law, to indicate an ongoing emergency, the combined use of blue lights and sirens is necessary. The use of blue lights without a siren is not codified in Italian law; steady blue lights, without siren, are nonetheless commonly used to enhance on-road visibility of the emergency vehicle and to signal passers-by that the vehicle is on duty.

==== Amber lights ====
The amber lights are reserved (and mandatory) for heavy equipment and utility vehicles such as excavators, tow trucks or bin lorries.

=== Japan ===
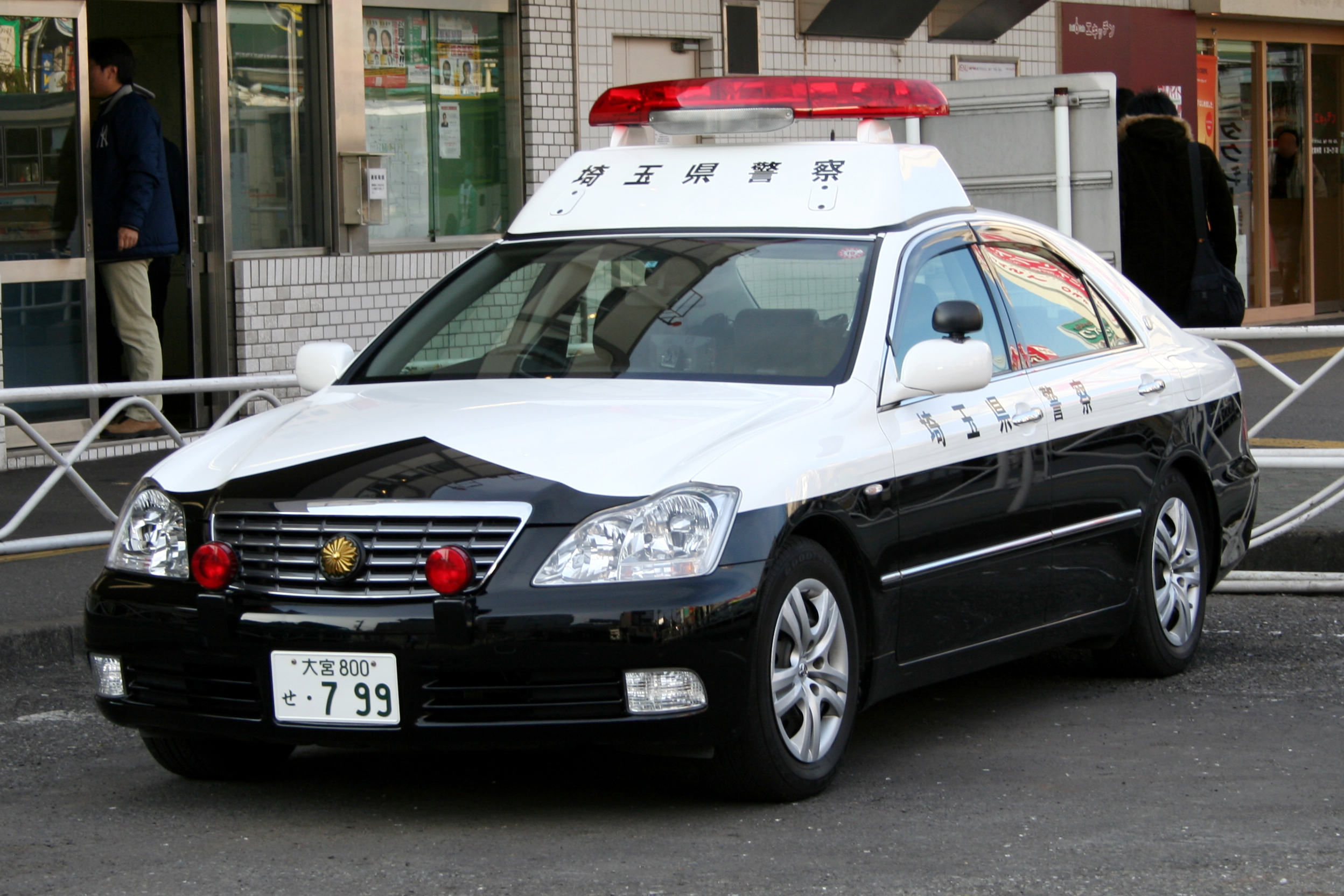
A Japanese police car with a PATLITE AWS light bar

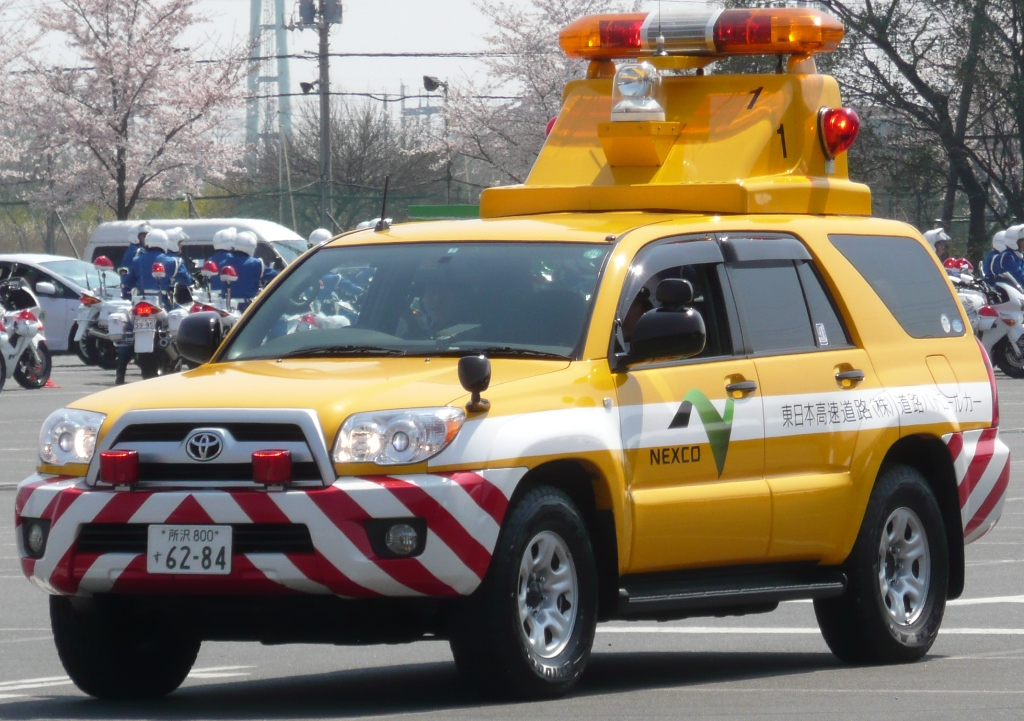
NEXCO East Japan patrol car with amber and red light bar

Red is the most used color on Japanese emergency vehicles. Japanese police use light bars mounted on a raised (mechanical) platform to make them more visible over congested streets. Rotating lights are most commonly used. But some newer vehicles have LED light bars installed. Vehicles with any other light color than red are security or engineers. Wig-wag headlights are not used.

- Red: Police, fire department, ambulance, and any other certified emergency vehicles (electric power company, gas supplier, railway company, Japanese Red Cross Society, local government, etc.).
- Amber: Construction/repair/road cleaning vehicles, snow plows, highway maintenance vehicles.
- Blue: Voluntary anti-crime patrol vehicles.
- Green: Oversized vehicles and their pilot vehicles.
- Purple: Roadside breakdown vehicles.
- White and Green: Used by Tokyo on patrol bicycles used in urban and beach settings.

=== Latvia ===
All emergency vehicles in Latvia are equipped with roof beacons that are:

- blue/dark blue and red colour lights - Police (Policija), Road police (Ceļu policija) and Military Police (Militārā policija)
- dark blue with smaller white lights
- dark blue beacons - Ambulance/Paramedics (Neatliekamā medicīniskā palīdzība)
- dark blue beacons - The gas emergency service (Avārijas dienests/Gāzes avārijas dienests)
- dark blue beacons - Firefighters (Valsts Ugunsdzēsības un Glābšanas Dienests)

Emergency vehicles only get the right to violate traffic rules if they have blue (red) beacons and the siren enabled.

The police cars are the only emergency vehicles that are sometimes equipped with red beacons. Military Police Vehicle will always have a red beacon installed. Red beacon can be seen very rare and is used only for military and huge cargo escorts. If all, blue, red and the siren are enabled, all traffic must stop until the next police car with only blue lights passes.

Amber lights are non-emergency and are used to attract attention of other members of traffic and does not give any priority. Can be equipped to any vehicle legally.

=== Malaysia ===
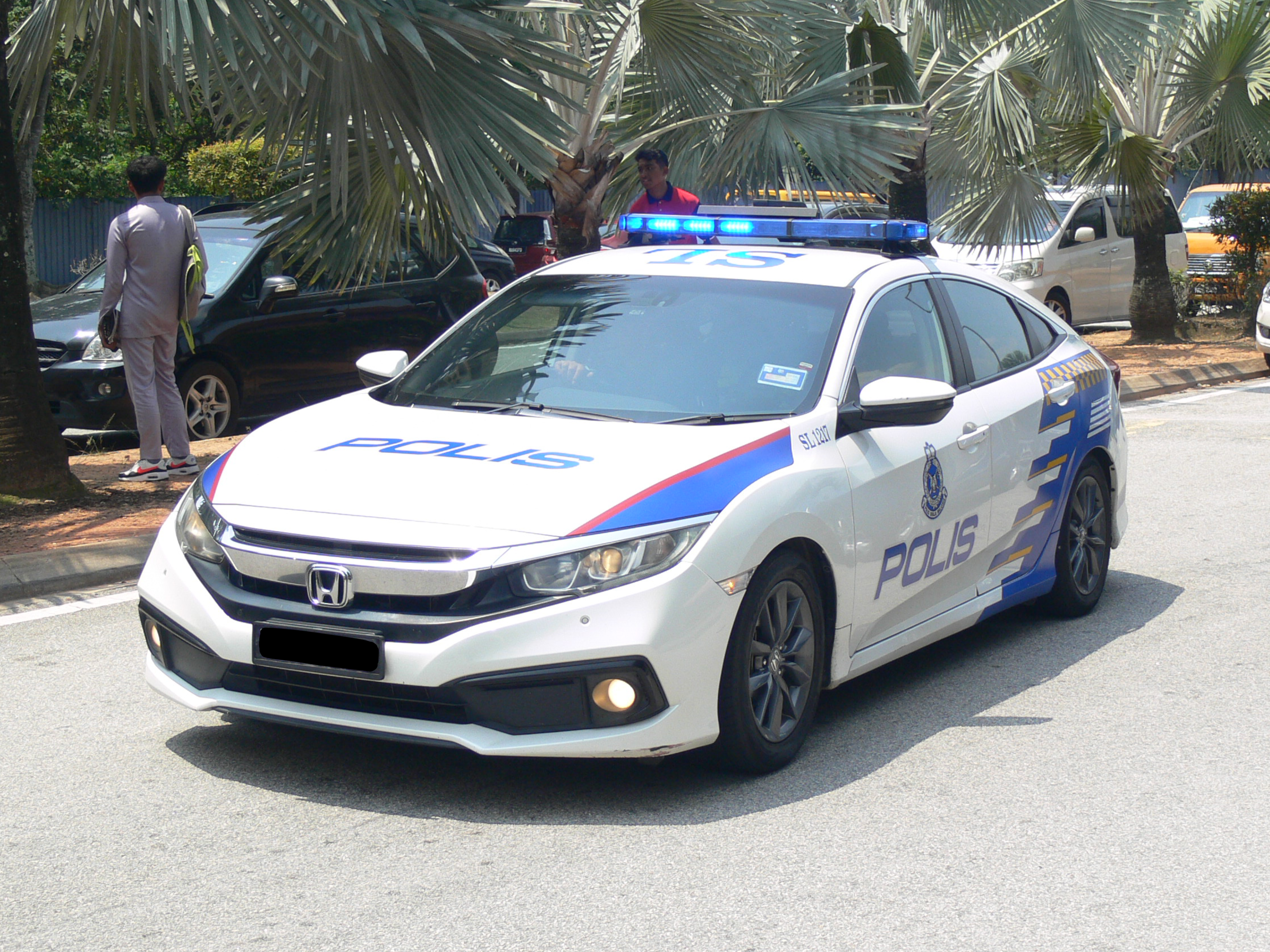
A picture of a new Honda Civic 1.8S Malaysian police car patrolling the street with its blue light

A Malaysian ambulance with its flashing red and white lights

Blue lights are used by police, military police, auxiliary police, the customs department, Road Transport Department and district enforcer vehicles (Patrol, Tow Truck and Sanitation included). In rare instances, some older police vehicles also have red and amber lights on the lightbar, to catch traffic attention or to act as a traffic advisor.

All Red for military vehicles, usually short/small lightbars.

Red and blue (including darker blue) is used by fire trucks, civil defense vehicles, SMART and MAQIS vehicles, the immigration department and a limited amount of hearse vans.

Red with optional white or darker blue for ambulances.

Yellow/amber (not including traffic advisor lights) is for security cars, semi-trucks with big and long trailers, tow trucks, road or highway maintenance/authority vehicles (with optional red lights), some military vehicles, airport service vehicles (excluding airport emergency services), a limited amount of hearse vans, emergency response team vehicles, slow-moving vehicles including the backhoe and road sweepers, vehicles that work at the side of the road including the garbage trucks, and water and power service/company vehicles.

A single strobe white light may be used by the hospital hearse vans.

Alternating lights (wig-wag headlights) are also equipped for certain emergency vehicles such as fire trucks and ambulances.

It is illegal for civilians to have an emergency light on their personal vehicles as it has its own regulation, regulated by the Road Transport Department Malaysia. The same goes for sirens (which are emergency vehicles only).

=== Netherlands ===
The color of emergency vehicle lighting is blue. Vehicles using flashing blue lights and siren have right of way over all other vehicles. Only designated emergency/priority vehicles may use blue lights; this includes police, fire brigade, ambulance service and a few other, smaller services such as the blood bank and some lifeguard organizations. Dutch police vehicles have an LED matrix display, which can show different texts in red lighting. Most often used are STOP POLITIE (ordering a driver to pull over and stop) or VOLGEN POLITIE (ordering driver to follow the police vehicle). Standard Dutch police cars often have the text bar incorporated in the light bar, vans and motorcycles usually have a separate sign on the front of the vehicle.

On ambulances and policy vehicles, a green beacon indicates the command vehicle when multiple units are responding to an incident - usually this is the first vehicle that arrives on the scene. Newer ambulance models also have a text display that will alternate the words ‘Ambulance’ and ‘Spoed’ (‘urgent’). Whenever the vehicles are on scene (usually fire brigade vehicles and some police vans), or staying in place for another reason, they need to switch to amber lighting to signal that they are not moving.

All emergency vehicles in the Netherlands also make use of amber, to make themselves visible in dangerous positions, or while being on scene. Construction vehicles, tow trucks and vehicles of a municipality can also make use of amber.

=== New Zealand ===
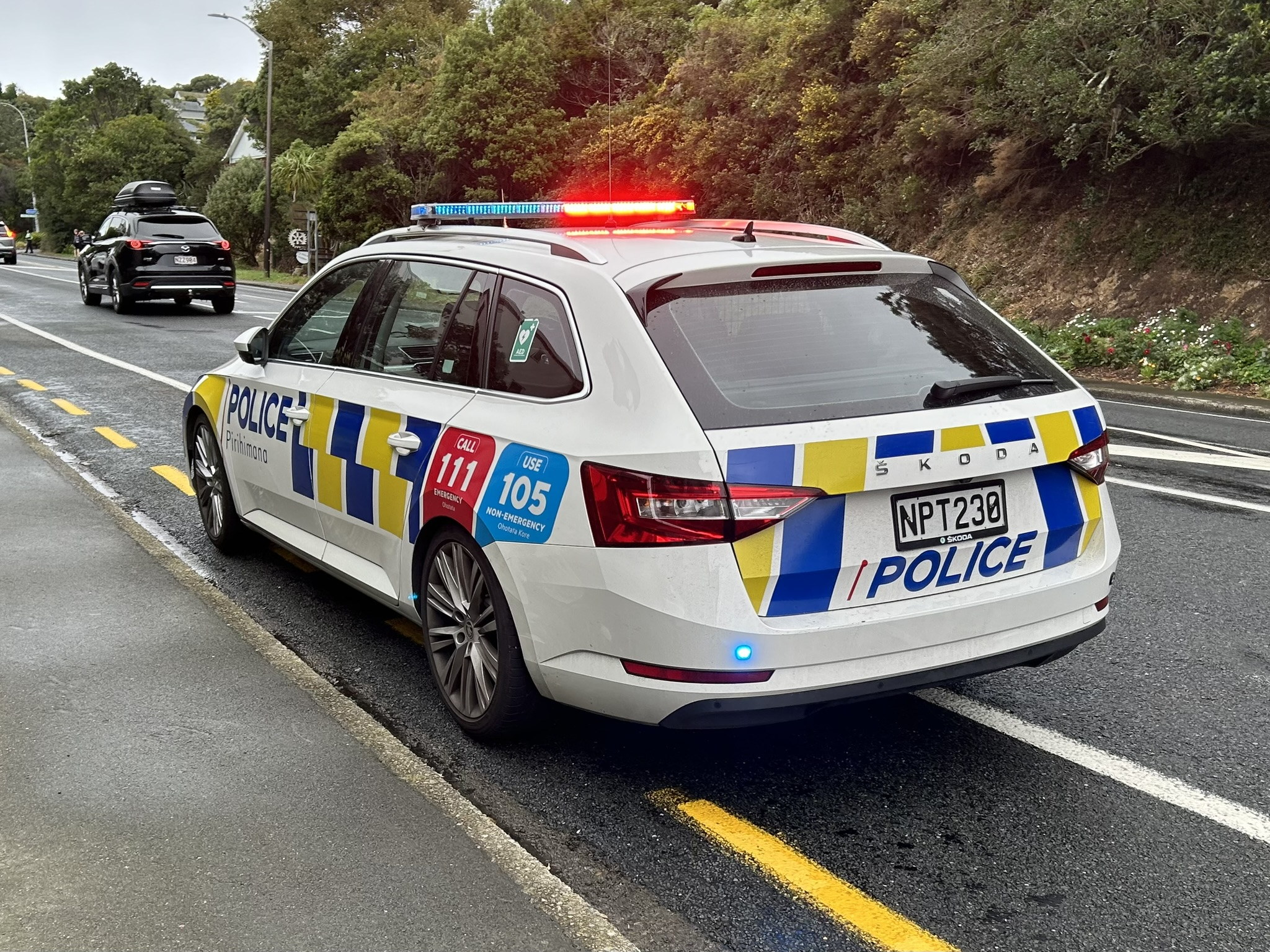
New Zealand Police Skoda Superb at MVC with secondary (slow) lighting pattern activated

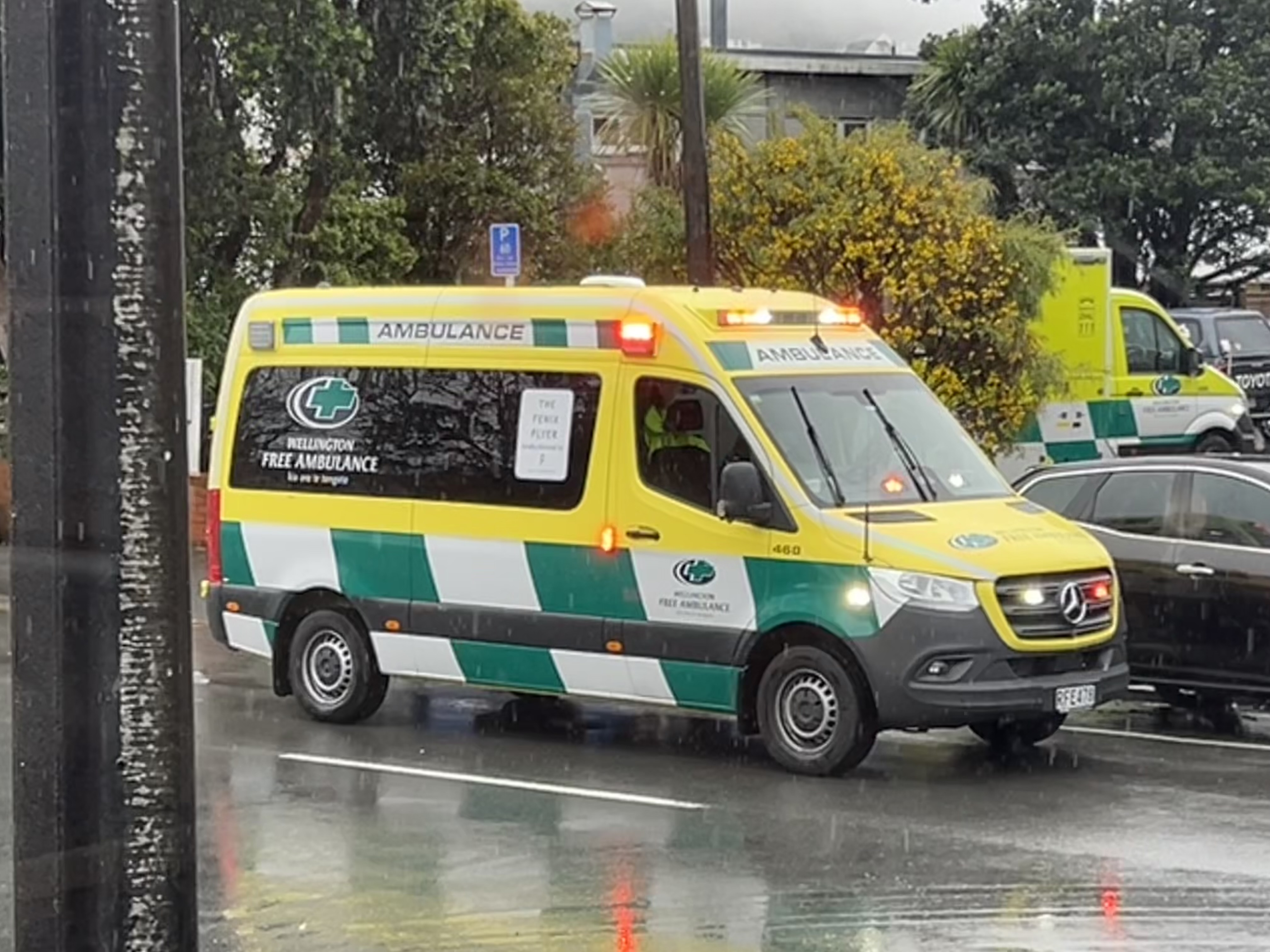
A Wellington Free Ambulance Mercedes Sprinter at medical event with second (fast) lighting pattern activated

In New Zealand, the colours used on lightbars and beacons are defined by the New Zealand Transport Agency Waka Kotahi regulations.

- Red and blue: New Zealand Police. The New Zealand Police use red and blue warning lights. Police is the only service allowed to use red and blue warning lights, this is to distinguish police from other emergency services so drivers know whether to give-way or pull over. Prior to 1992 New Zealand Police vehicle warning lights were all blue to distinguish them from the all red lights of Traffic Officers which were part of the former New Zealand Ministry of Transport Traffic Safety Service.
- Red: Used by any vehicle defined as an emergency vehicle to signify to other vehicles to give way to the emergency vehicle. This includes FENZ (Fire and Emergency New Zealand), Civil Defence and recognised ambulance services such as Hato Hone St John, Wellington Free Ambulance, Auckland Rescue Helicopter Trust and those of the New Zealand Defence Force.
- Blue: Used by customs officers, fisheries officers, marine reserve officers. Despite not being police, officers from these agency's do have the right to stop vehicles and drivers are required to pull over.
- Amber: Amber lights may be operated by towing companies, traffic management agencies, construction site vehicles and heavy vehicles, or by other utility vehicles when necessary to warn other motorists of a hazard. Amber must also be fitted to oversize vehicles and their pilot vehicles. Vehicles operating in airports and sea ports must display amber lights. Amber lights are permitted on Surf Life Saving rescue vehicles. Enforcement employees of councils (such as Animal Control or Parking Wardens) often use vehicles fitted with amber warning lights.
- Green: Green emergency lighting is used by Registered Medical Practitioner, Registered Nurse or Registered Midwife on emergency calls. While it grants no special exemptions, drivers must give way to them.
- Purple (magenta): Load pilots escorting a load wider than 5m must display purple beacons to alert other road users there is an oversize load they may need to move out of the way for.

Volunteers in general are afforded no special privileges and cannot use flashing lights or sirens in order to navigate traffic. However, in the case of FENZ volunteer operational support members, who respond to calls in their own private vehicles, may be authorized by their unit or brigade to display a red beacon, for reasons of safety and identification. However, these lights may only be fitted and operational while stationary at an emergency scene, not while mobile in traffic.

=== Norway ===
Emergency services in Norway use only blue lighting. If a blue flashing light is seen in either traffic or the sea, other vehicles must yield to let that vehicle pass. Blue flashing lights are used by police, military police, customs, fire departments, rescue services, and ambulances. Government, VIP, and embassy vehicles may also use blue if accompanied by police. Any vehicle equipped with a blue flashing light must have a permission issued by the NPRA. The operator of such vehicle must be a qualified emergency vehicle operator and have a ‘code 160’ endorsement on their driver's license. Blue lights can be used alone or with an additional siren. The siren may not be used alone. The operator of an emergency vehicle may disregard speed limits and traffic lights with caution. Amber lights, however, are not regulated, but are used for any vehicle that need special attention, such as tow-trucks, snow plows, and parking enforcement. Red flashing lights are no longer in use, and were last used in the early 1960s.

=== Poland ===
Only designated vehicles (such as police, fire service, ambulances, Internal Affairs, etc.) are permitted to use blue light. The sale of a blue emergency light is permitted; however, the possession of such a light in vehicles (whether turned on or off, visible or not) is strictly illegal. Red lights are used by the first and last vehicle of a convoy of designated vehicles and also are strictly regulated. Amber lights are seeing increasing popularity in recent years, but specific uses are designated according to the Polish Kodeks Drogowy. There are no specific rules governing the use of other colors such as purple, green, or clear lights.

=== Philippines ===
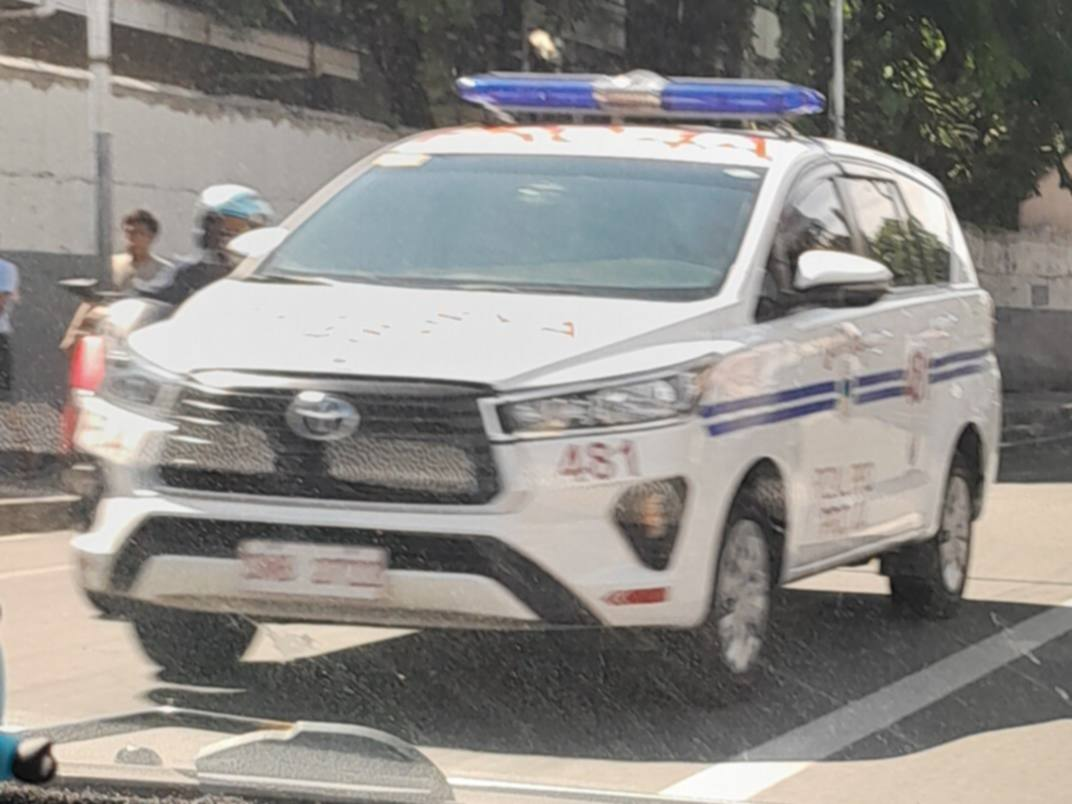
A police car used by the Philippine National Police, with an all-blue lightbar.

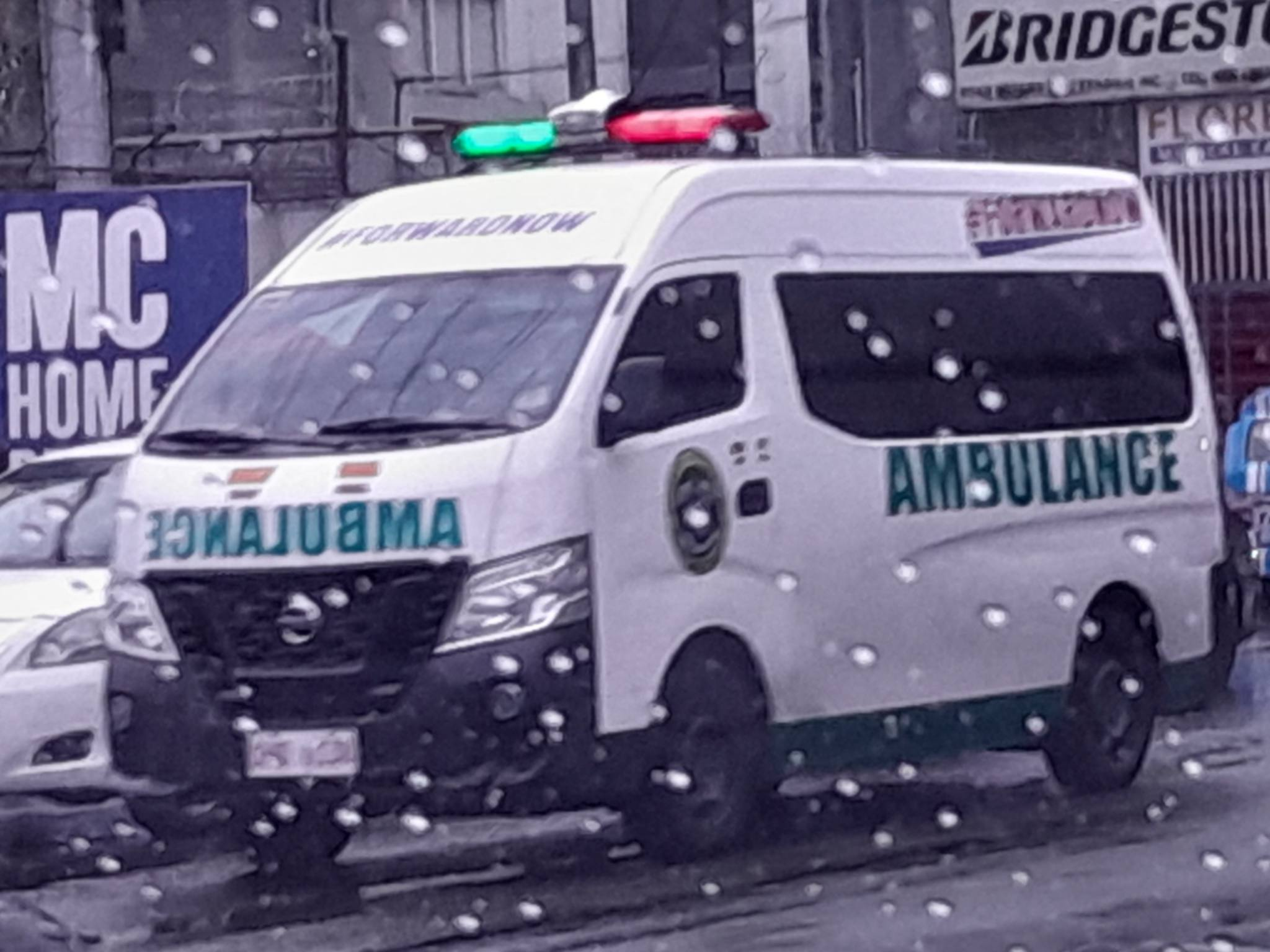
An ambulance used by the Philippine Department of Health, with a red-green lightbar.

In the Philippines, the right to use sirens and blinkers (commonly referred to as 'wang-wang') is regulated by numerous rules and regulations; including but not limited to Presidential Decree 96, Land Transportation Office Administrative Order No. 1 Series of 1973, Republic Act 4136 Section 34 b-1, the LTO Memorandum - Motorcycle Escorts and Unauthorized use of sirens, blinkers, markers, etc., and Department Of Transportation Administrative Order 2024-001, among many others.

Presidential Decree 96 states that only the Armed Forces of the Philippines, National Bureau of Investigation, Land Transportation Office, Police Departments, Fire Departments, and Hospital Ambulances can use wang wang; with the list of authorized vehicles being extended by Land Transportation Office Administrative Order No. 1 Series of 1973 to also allow Law Enforcement Motor Vehicles and Fire Trucks to use sirens and blinkers. However, Tower Service Cars, and Wreckers are only allowed to use blinkers without sirens. The order states that Law Enforcement Motor Vehicles may be equipped with red dome lights and/or a siren, fire trucks may have unspecified motor dome lights with sirens and/or bells, hospital ambulances may use blue dome lights and sirens, and tower service cars and wreckers may only be fitted with blue dome lights without sirens. The Armed Forces of the Philippines, the Land Transportation Office, and police departments may use red dome lights and/or a three-in-one siren, the National Bureau of Investigation has no mention of any particular or specific light colors but may use an ordinary siren, and fire departments may use amber dome lights with ordinary sirens and/or bells; it should be noted however that this order has been amended by DOTR AO 2024-001.

Likewise, Section 34 b-1 of Republic Act 4136 allows Police Cars, Fire Wagons, and Ambulances to use a bell, siren, or exhaust whistle of a type approved by the Commissioner of Land Transportation; though there are no mentions regarding blinker or dome light colors for such vehicles.

The LTO Memorandum on Motorcycle Escorts and Unauthorized use of sirens, blinkers, markers, etc. states that only the Philippines' top 5 government officials; namely the President of the Philippines, Vice President of the Philippines, Senate President of the Philippines, Speaker of the Philippine House of Representatives of the Philippines, and the Chief Justice of the Philippine Supreme Court are allowed to use sirens and blinkers, as well as have motorcycle escorts. However, the late Benigno Aquino III and former Philippine President Rodrigo Duterte have both refused to use their LTO Memorandum on Motorcycle Escorts and Unauthorized use of sirens, blinkers, markers, etc. privileges to use sirens, during their respective presidencies.

The Department of Transportation's DOTr Administrative Order 2024-001 amends the Land Transportation Office Administrative Order No. 1 Series of 1973 and regulates what kind of light colors are allowed for each type of emergency vehicle. For Law Enforcement Motor Vehicles, they are now permitted to use red, white, and blue lights with sirens, while fire trucks can now use red and blue lights with sirens and/or bells. Ambulances today are only allowed to use blue lights and sirens, and tower service cars and wreckers can only use yellow lights without sirens. The same DOTr Administrative Order also allows other government agencies that are not mentioned in either PD 96, LTO AO No.1 Series of 1973, Republic Act 4136 Section 34 b-1, or any other relevant rule or regulation concerning wang wang and/or emergency vehicles, to file an emergency vehicle permit with the Land Transportation Office to gain permission to have their vehicles fitted with blinkers and sirens. However, there are no explicitly mentioned light colors anymore for the Armed Forces of the Philippines, National Bureau of Investigation, Land Transportation Office, Philippine National Police, or the Bureau of Fire Protection. The first 4 of the 5 mentioned government agencies may only use wang wang on "Marked patrol motor vehicles including motorcycles", while the BFP may only use wang wang on "marked fire trucks."

Section 35 of Republic Act 4136 provides speed limit restrictions, with the following exceptions:

1. A physician or his driver when the former responds to emergency calls;
2. The driver of a hospital ambulance on the way to and from the place of accident or other emergency;
3. Any driver bringing a wounded or sick person for emergency treatment to a hospital, clinic, or any other similar place;
4. The driver of a motor vehicle belonging to the Armed Forces while in use for official purposes in times of riot, insurrection or invasion;
5. The driver of a vehicle, when he or his passengers are in pursuit of a criminal;
6. A law-enforcement officer who is trying to overtake a violator of traffic laws; and
7. The driver officially operating a motor vehicle of any fire department, provided that exemption shall not be construed to allow unless or unnecessary fast driving of drivers aforementioned.

Section 42 establishes the right of way rule, while Section 43 establishes 3 key exceptions:

(a) The driver of a vehicle entering a highway from a private road or drive shall yield the right of way to all vehicles approaching on such highway.

(b) The driver of a vehicle upon a highway shall yield the right of way to police or fire department vehicles and ambulances when such vehicles are operated on official business and the drivers thereof sound audible signal of their approach.

(c) The driver of a vehicle entering a "through highway" or a "stop intersection" shall yield the right of way to all vehicles approaching to either direction on such "through highway": Provided, That nothing in this subsection shall be construed as relieving the driver of any vehicle being operated on a "through highway" from the duty of driving with due regard for the safety of vehicles entering such "through highway" nor as protecting the said driver from the consequence of an arbitrary exercise off such right of way.

Section 49 obligates that all other traffic make way for police cars, fire trucks, and ambulances.

=== Romania ===
Romanian police vehicle with red and blue lights

The three emergency lights used in Romania are red, blue and amber. At a red flashing light, bringing the vehicle to a full stop is compulsory, while for a blue light yielding, slowing down and moving out of the way is compulsory, and an amber light means other traffic vehicles must proceed with caution due to an oversized or slow vehicle.

The cars that are allowed to use red lights are the Romanian Police and the Romanian General Inspectorate for Emergency Situations.

Cars that are allowed to use a blue rotating light are the Romanian Police (including Local Police), Romanian Gendarmerie, Romanian Border Police, emergency medical services (including SMURD), Civil Protection, Ministry of National Defense, Special Units of the Romanian Intelligence Service, Protection and Guard Service, Ministry of Justice - General Directorate of Prisons, Public Ministry when in mission, National Anticorruption Directorate when in mission, and Financial Guard vehicles.

The amber rotating light mean the vehicle and some accompanying vehicles are oversized, overweight, transporting dangerous goods, work as road/street maintenance, are tow trucks, are tractors, or are agricultural vehicles.

=== Russia ===
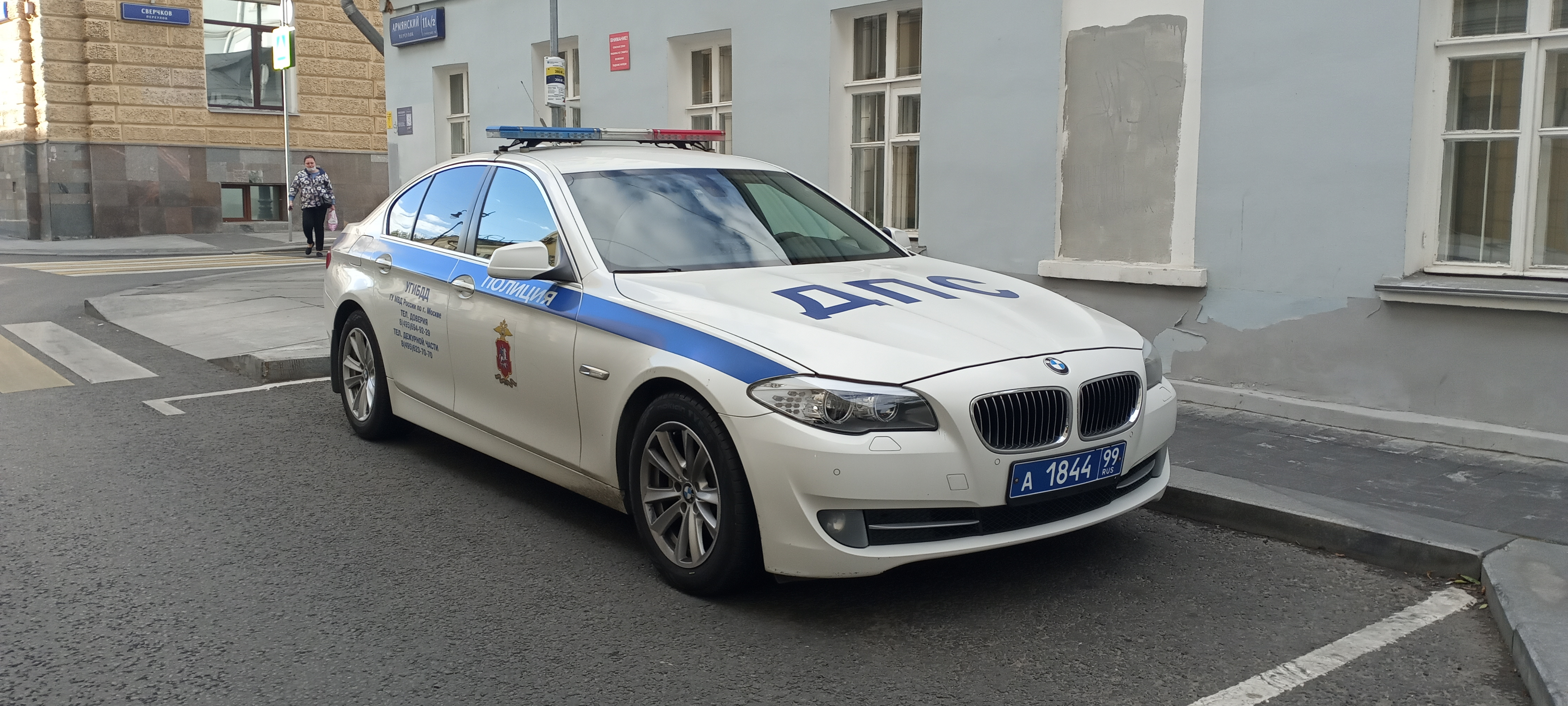
Traffic police car with red and blue lights in Moscow

- Red and blue: Traffic police, FSO, FSB vehicles. The Highway Patrol Service uses red and blue flashing lights on its service vehicles
- Blue: Police, ambulance, fire service, military police, military ambulance, EMERCOM vehicles, gas emergency service, Central Bank of Russia vehicles. Police the Russian Interior Ministry uses blue light on its official vehicles The Russian Emergencies Ministry's fire service uses blue light on its special vehicles Russian ambulances use blue flashing lights on their special vehicles
- Amber: Construction and utility vehicles, airport service vehicles (excluding emergency vehicles), snow removal.
- White: Russian post, armored cash transport cars.

=== Serbia ===
- Blue: Police, ambulance service, fire brigade, military police, military ambulance, traffic police, prison service.
- Blue and red: First vehicle of a police vehicles convoy or military police convoy.
- Amber: Municipality police, utility and construction vehicles, heavy machines, tractors, slow vehicles.

=== Slovenia ===
- Blue: Police, ambulance service, fire brigade, military police, military ambulance, traffic police.
- Blue and red: First and last vehicle accompanying a police/military/... convoy.
- Blue and green: Formerly used on last vehicles accompanying police/military/... convoys.
- White: Additional lightbar color, wig-wag on emergency vehicles, accident scene lighting
- Amber: Municipality police, utility and construction vehicles, heavy machines, slow vehicles.

=== South Korea ===
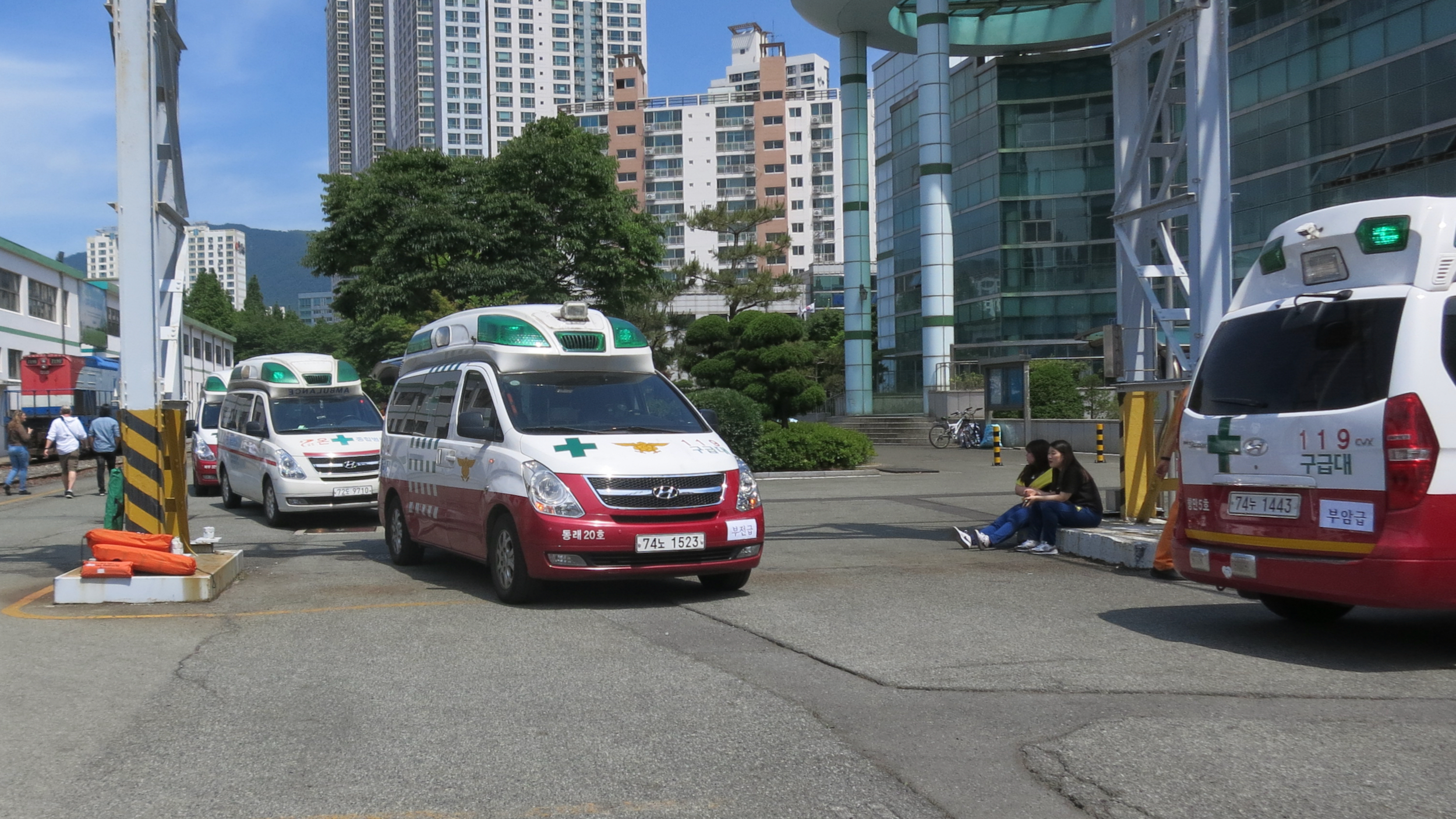
Ambulances with green lights at a training simulation in Busan

- Red: Fire department, Gyeongi province ambulances, some police vehicles
- Blue: Police motorcycles, some police vehicles, volunteer firefighters
- Red and blue: Police patrol cars
- Green: Ambulances (some privately operated ambulances use green and red lights)
- Yellow/amber: Utility vehicles, Security Company

=== Spain ===
Up until 2018 the Reglamento General de Vehículos (legislation regarding vehicles) only allowed the Cuerpo Nacional de Policía (National police), Guardia Civil (gendarmerie) and law-enforcement agencies under the authority of the different Comunidad autónoma and Ayuntamientos (city councils) to use blue lights. This was an anomaly in Europe, where most emergency vehicles universally use blue lights.

Spanish legislation restricted blue to police forces and law-enforcement agencies, allowing ambulances and fire engines only the use of yellow/amber lights (typically used throughout the continent to mark slow vehicles). Despite being technically illegal, some SAMU (ambulances) and fire engines, both usually under the jurisdiction of the Autonomous Communities or Ayuntamientos, used red, white and even blue lights in combination with the yellow/amber ones.

This situation caused confusion, leading to the 2018 modification of the Reglamento and giving all emergency vehicles that were still using yellow/amber lights (ambulances, fire engines, Civil defense) a 2-year period to make the switch to blue lights. Yellow/amber lights are now only used in wide-load trucks and their accompanying vehicles among other special vehicles, such as tractors or tow trucks. A steady burn green light is permitted on taxis available for hire.

To sum up:

- Blue: All emergency vehicles (police and law-enforcement agencies, ambulances, fire engines, Civil defense)
- Yellow/amber: Wide-load trucks and their accompanying vehicles among other special vehicles, such as tractors or tow trucks

Municipal police, national police, Guardia Civil (gendarmerie), Civil defense, Ambulance and Fire services are all eligible to claim traffic exemptions such as jumping red lights, illegal parking etc. Municipal police, national police, fire and ambulance services can all claim full exemptions to traffic laws whilst civil defence and Guardia Civil are only eligible to claim more limited exemptions to traffic laws.

=== Sweden ===
==== Blue ====
Police vehicles, medical vehicles and fire engines along with other government vehicles such as the Swedish Military Police and the Swedish Customs Service use white and dark ‘Euro blue’ emergency lights. Ordinary traffic are required to make way for these vehicles if the lights are on (including traffic advisor lights).

Blue lights and sirens may also be used on vehicles of that belong to private companies or organizations if their role is either life saving or protecting some vital system of society. This includes but is not limited to medical & public transport, gas & electricity companies and security (specifically, security officers in charge of protecting government buildings, airports and ports).

==== Amber ====
Amber lights grant no priority in traffic and exist purely to advertise the vehicle's presence, usually as a warning. Most commonly used on heavy machinery, trucks, bulldozers, slow-going, utility vehicles and construction vehicles like are equipped with yellow/amber lights. It is legal to fit these lights to other vehicles, such as privately owned cars.

==== Red ====
The Swedish police use a forward-facing red light to indicate that a driver must pull over and stop. Fire vehicles use a red light to designate the command post.

==== Green ====
Swedish ambulances use a single green flashing light to indicate the command post.

=== Taiwan ===
- Red and Blue: Fire department, ambulance vehicles, some police patrol cars.
- Red: Police motorcycles, some police vehicles, volunteer firefighters, railway company, The Red Cross Society of the Republic of China (Taiwan), local government.
- Amber: Construction/repair/road cleaning vehicles, snow plows, highway maintenance vehicles, electric power company, slow-going, gas supplier, security company.
- Blue: Voluntary anti-crime patrol vehicles.
- Green: Oversized vehicles and their pilot vehicles.
- Purple: Roadside breakdown vehicles.

=== Thailand ===
Red is the most used color on Thailand emergency vehicles. The Thailand police use light bars mounted on top platform to make them more visible over congested streets. Rotating lights are most commonly used. But some newer vehicles have LED light bars installed. Vehicles with any other light color than red are security or engineers. Wig-wag headlights are not used.

- Red: Police, fire department, police highway patrol vehicles, ambulance, and any other certified emergency vehicles (electric power company, military police, military ambulance, gas supplier, railway company, Thai Red Cross Society, local government, etc.).
- Amber: Construction/repair/road cleaning vehicles, snow plow, highway maintenance vehicles.
- Blue: Voluntary anti-crime patrol vehicles.
- Green: Oversized vehicles and their pilot vehicles.
- Magenta: Roadside breakdown vehicles.

=== Turkey ===
- Red and blue: Police, gendarmerie, coast guard, military police, customs enforcement
- Blue: Ambulance, prison vehicles, revenue vehicles
- Red: Fire brigade, AFAD vehicles
- Amber and blue: Municipal police
- Amber: Construction and utility vehicles, gas, water and electric emergency vehicles airport service vehicles, snow removal
- Green: Funeral vehicles

=== United Kingdom ===
==== Blue lights ====
The main colour for emergency service vehicles in the United Kingdom is overwhelmingly blue, although there is also widespread use of additional flashing white front lights when moving, and additional flashing red rear lights when stationary. This aids visibility and helps indication direction of travel or warning of a stopped vehicle.

Usage of emergency vehicle equipment in Great Britain is regulated through the Road Vehicle Lighting Regulations 1989 and the Road Vehicle Construction and Use Regulations 1986, while the local equivalents in Northern Ireland are the Road Vehicle Lighting Regulations (Northern Ireland) 2000 and the Motor Vehicle Construction and Use Regulations (Northern Ireland) 1999 respectively. Only authorised emergency vehicles can display blue flashing lights, while flashing amber lights are used on a range of vehicles as warning lights. Breakdown recovery vehicles and highways agency vehicles use amber flashing lights, and when stationary can used additional red rear flashing lights. Bicycles can exhibit a flashing red rear lamp and flashing white front lamp.

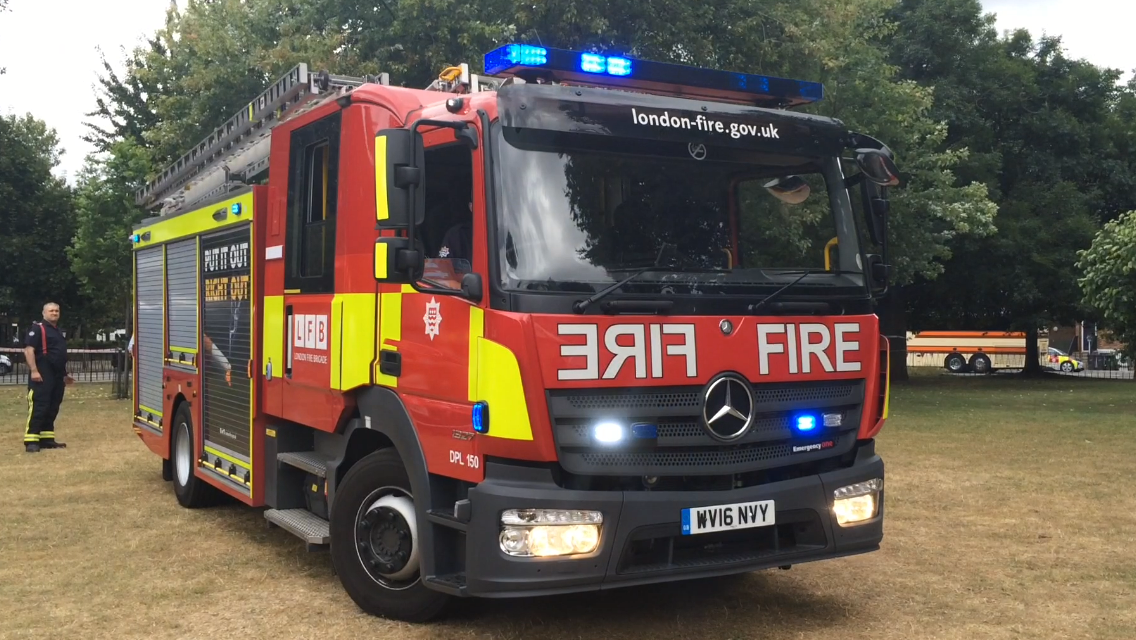
A London Fire Brigade appliance demonstrating blue and white lights. Both blue and white lights on vehicles are protected under legislation.

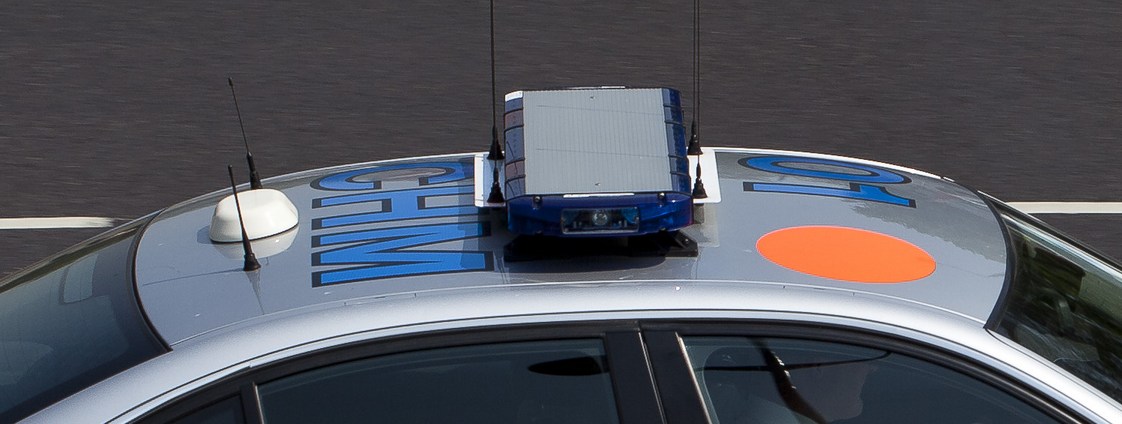
Lightbar incorporating blue lights and white 'alley' lights for night-time searches

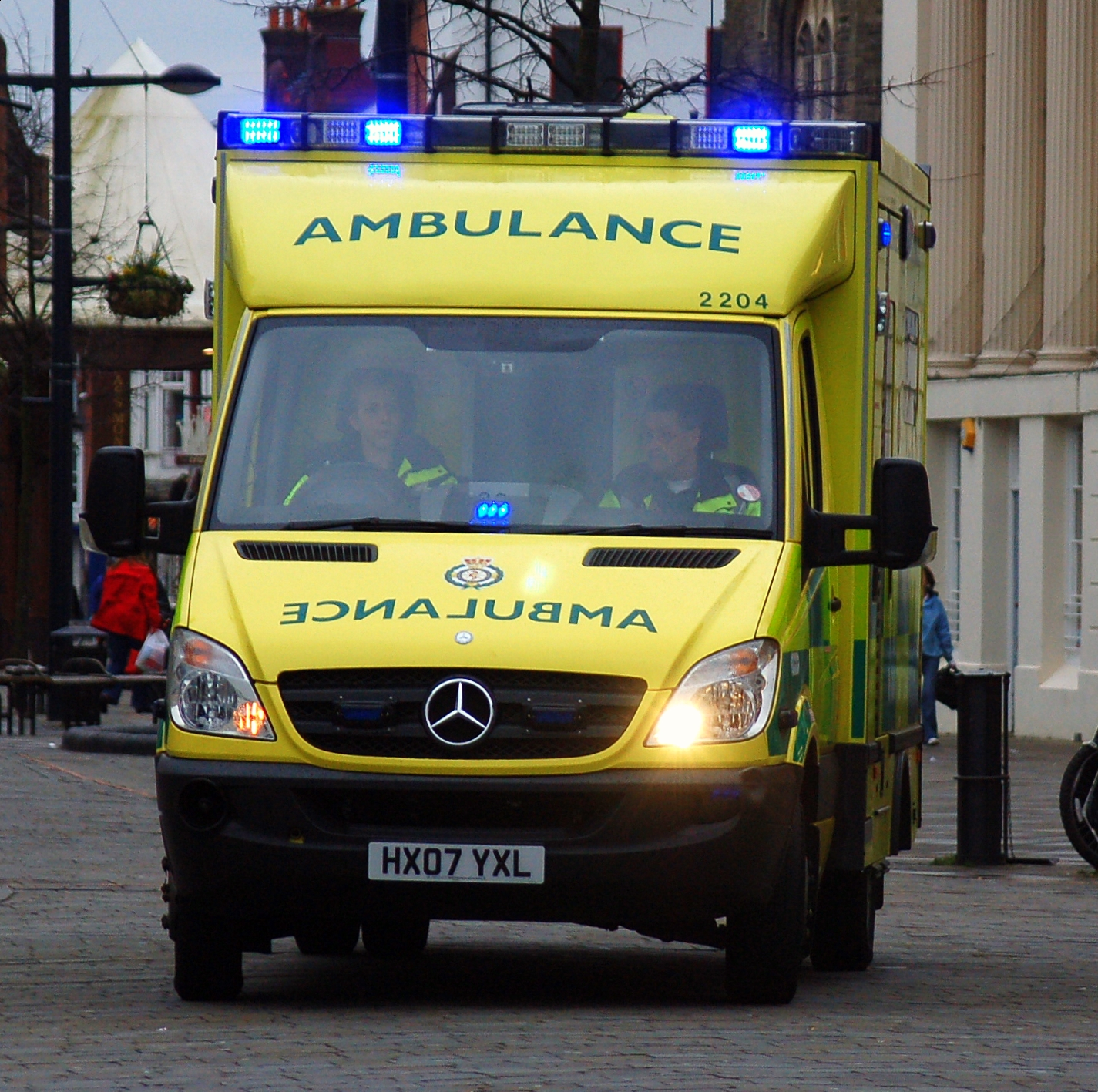
An ambulance responding with blue flashing lights and alternating headlights — 'wig-wags'

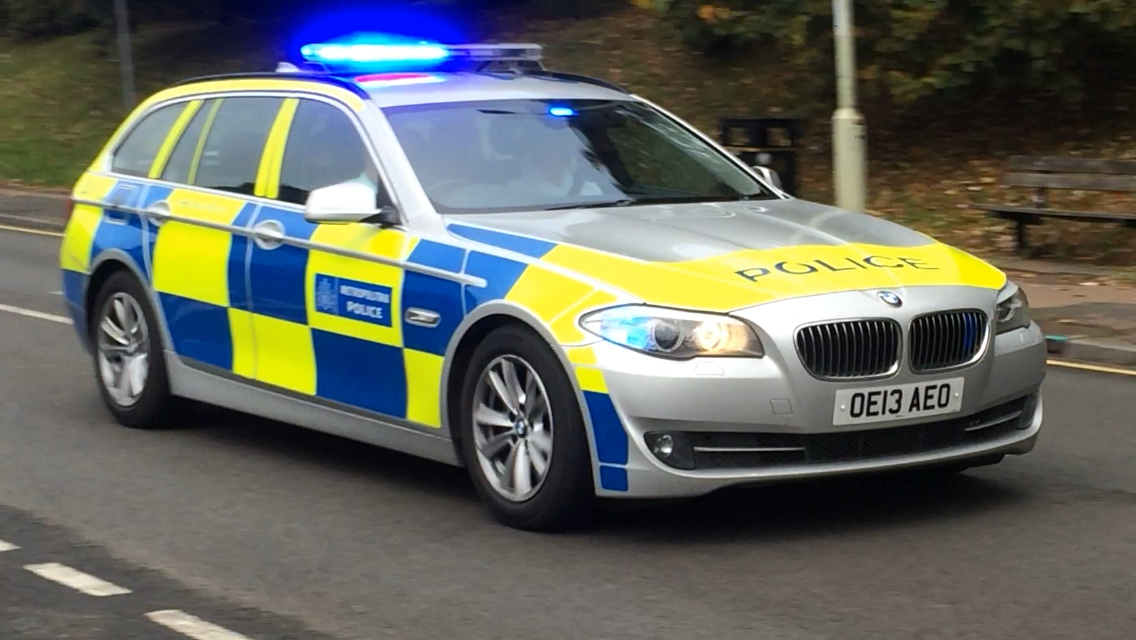
A Metropolitan Police 'area car' with emergency equipment activated. Such vehicle is considered an 'advanced' vehicle.

==== Driving ====
Blue flashing lights must only be lit at the scene of an emergency, or when the driver considers it desirable to indicate that the journey being undertaken is urgent, and (in terms of the law) convey to other drivers that they should take special care.

Although not specifically linked to the use of warning beacons, the police, fire brigade and ambulance services (and in certain cases, the blood services and bomb disposal units, but not the other emergency services listed above) may also choose to allow their drivers to claim legal exemptions from certain motoring regulations, such as being able to treat a red traffic light as a give way sign, exceeding the speed limit, passing the wrong side of a keep left/right sign, driving in a bus lane, or parking in restricted areas. They may not, however, ignore 'no entry' signs, drive the wrong way down a one-way street or cross a solid white line in the middle of the road (other than the same exceptions granted everyone else, for example to pass a stationary vehicle). In reality some drivers will disobey other laws at their professional judgement but they do so without any automatic protection from the law.

No qualification other than a driving licence is legally required to use blue lights; whilst provision has been made to require the drivers of emergency vehicles to have suitable training if they will be driving above the speed limit, this has not yet been brought into force. However, most organisations will insist that their drivers are trained in emergency driving techniques for the safety of all on the road. Police forces, specifically, typically have three levels of driving grade, as required by the College of Policing.

- Basic - police officers are permitted to drive in accordance with their standard driving licence, obeying all traffic laws and not claiming any exemptions. Blue emergency lights may only be used when performing a stop on a vehicle or when the vehicle is stationary at a scene.
- Response - police officers are permitted to drive intermediate-powered vehicles up to approx. 200bhp, utilising blue lights and sirens for emergency response whilst claiming exemptions.
- Advanced - police officers may drive 'high-performance' vehicles of 200bhp+, utilising emergency equipment for emergency response whilst claiming exemptions. This level of training is typically offered to road policing units and armed response vehicle officers, who are expected to drive high-performance vehicles in a daily capacity.

Response and advanced police drivers can be trained in 'initial phase' pursuit, which involves training in safely pursuing a vehicle under emergency driving conditions. Advanced drivers may further be trained in 'tactical phase' pursuit, which involves training in Tactical Pursuit And Containment (TPAC).

==== Amber lights ====
Amber lights grant no priority in traffic and exist purely to advertise the vehicle's presence, except when used by Driver & Vehicle Standards Agency or National Highways traffic officers where they can be used to indicate a requirement for another vehicle to stop. The regulations specifies several classes of vehicles that may use amber lights, such as vehicles towing, highway maintenance, pilot vehicles escorting an oversize load, and vehicles unable to travel over 25 mph and fitting these lights to other vehicles (such as privately owned or pedestrian) is legal (these beacons are widely fitted to vehicles as wide-ranging as security).

==== Other lights ====
Green flashing beacons can be used by doctors (registered with the General Medical Council). Many doctors now either volunteer or are employed as first responders for ambulance services and their vehicles will carry the, usually blue, lights used by the service or both blue and green to indicate their profession.

Flashing red lights are fitted to the vast majority of police, fire and ambulance vehicles – being used only when the vehicle is stationary to alert other drivers of their presence. 'Rear reds' are also used during large police escorts, with the rearmost vehicle displaying red lights to alert other motorist not to pass. Hazard lights may be wired to function at the same time, to make civilians further conscious of their presence. Rear fog lights may also be used in an alternating left/right pattern. Traffic enforcement vehicle (DVSA) may also use red lighting when stopping a vehicle.

Steady checkered lights denote command and control vehicles – these are red and white for fire (one of the few situations where a forward-facing red light may be shown), blue and white for police and green and white for ambulance, and are often fitted in the middle of the light bar. Civil enforcement vehicles also use red lights in certain jurisdictions. These red lights represent the vehicles status as above the standard citizen but below law enforcement.

It should also be noted that UK legislation considers all reflectors and reflective material to also be 'lights', and all items either being or resembling special warning beacons (of any colour), such as on preserved emergency vehicles, must be covered and not just disconnected (as this is a separate offence) while on the public highway. Similarly, no distinction is made between lights mounted on light bars and those mounted anywhere else on the vehicle (e.g. headlights, indicators, brake lights) – all are covered by the same regulations.

=== Vietnam ===
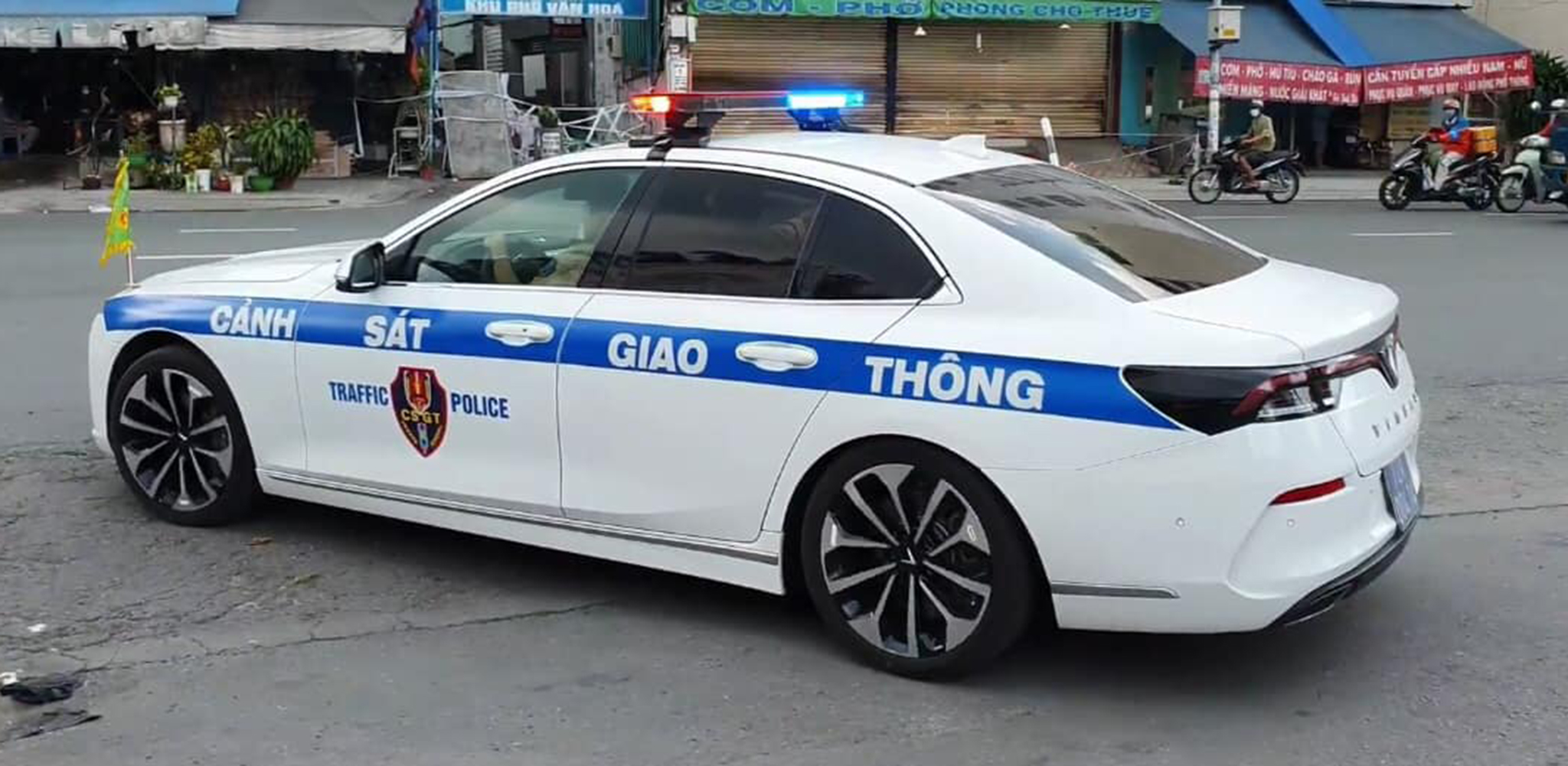
Vinfast Traffic Patrol Vehicle

- Red and Blue: Fire department, security departments force, ambulance vehicles, some police vehicles.
- Red: Police motorcycles, some police vehicles, volunteer firefighters, railway company, Viet Nam Red Cross Society, local government.
- Amber: Construction/repair/road cleaning vehicles, snow plows, highway maintenance vehicles, electric power company, slow-going, gas supplier, (not including traffic advisor lights) is for security cars, semi-trucks with big and long trailers.
- Blue: Voluntary anti-crime patrol vehicles.
- Green: Oversized vehicles and their pilot vehicles.
- Magenta: Roadside breakdown vehicles.

=== United States ===
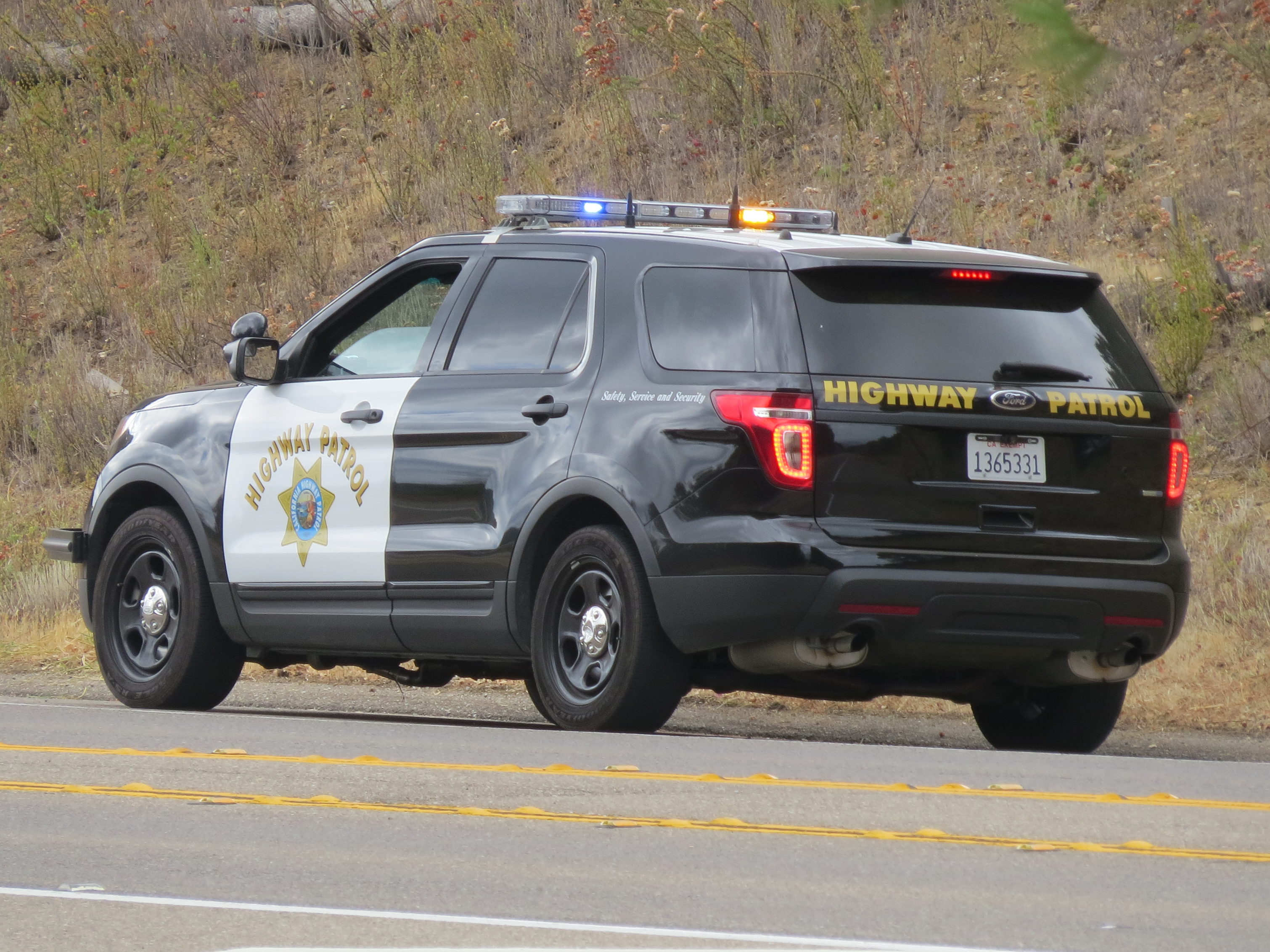
A California Highway Patrol Ford Explorer with its emergency lights and traffic advisor on

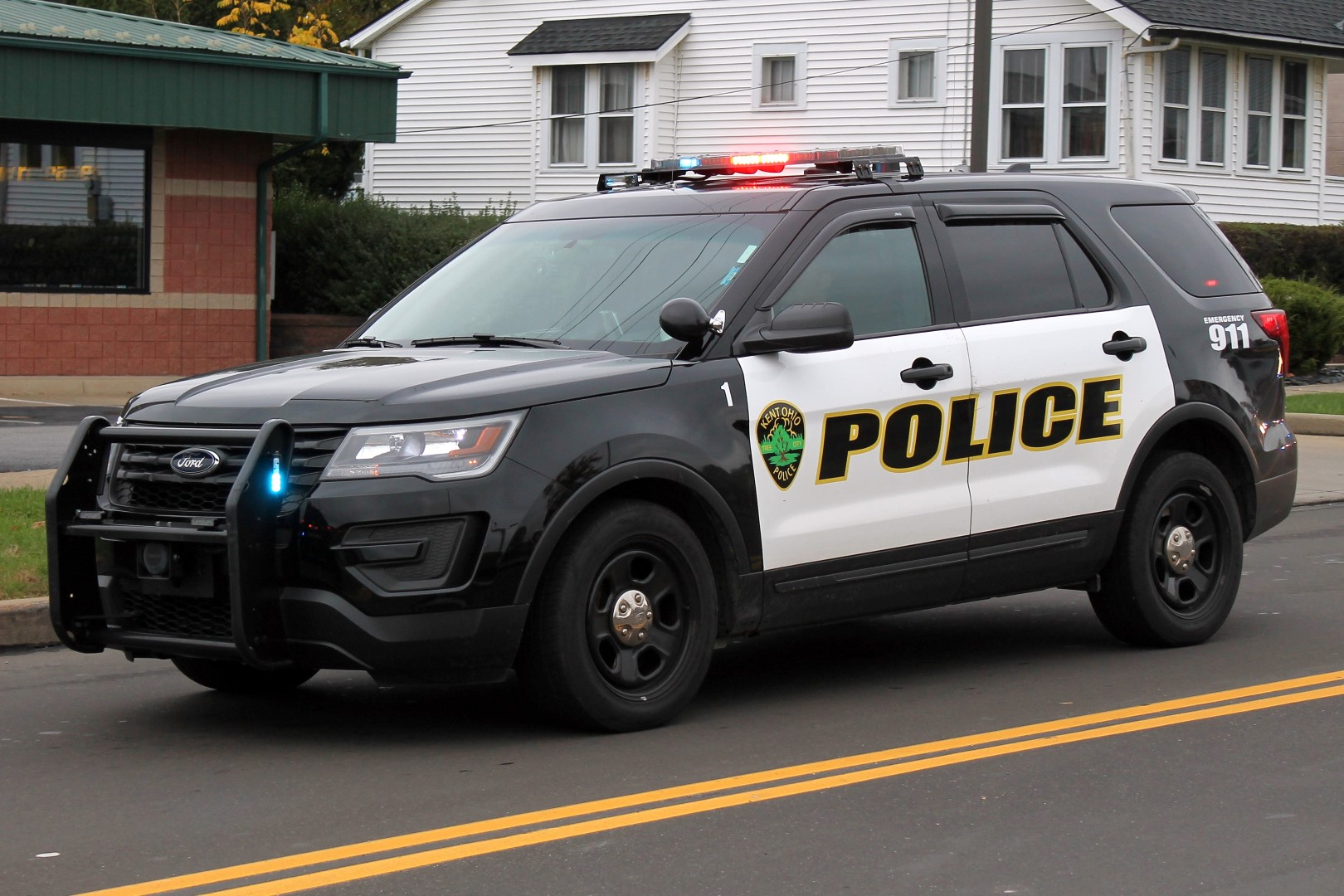
Kent Ohio Police Ford Police Interceptor Utility

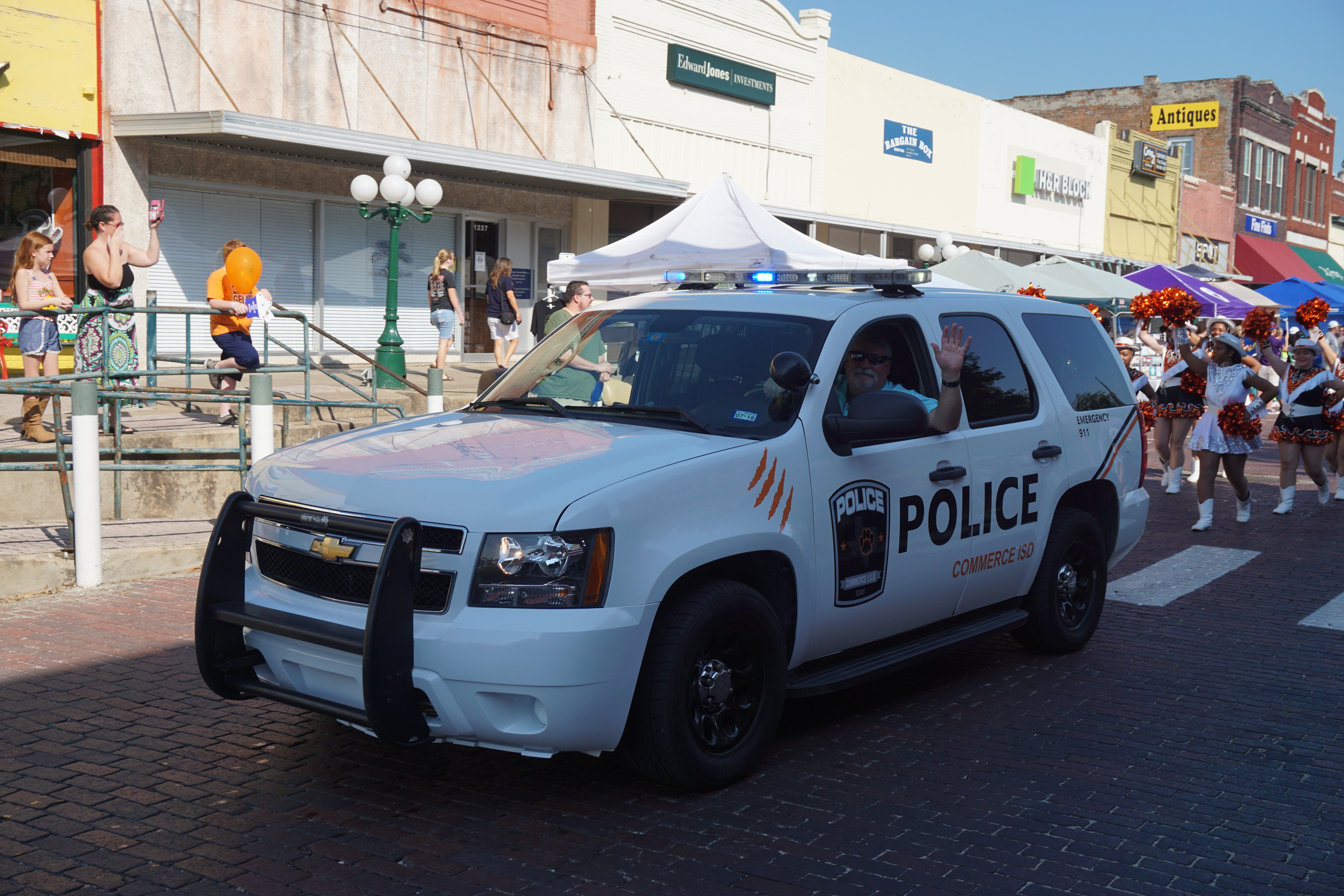
A modern Commerce I.S.D. Police Chevrolet Tahoe Commerce, Texas (United States)

In the United States, colors are generally regulated at the state and local levels, but there are some commonalities.

==== Red ====
- Almost always denotes an emergency vehicle if the lights are facing forward
- A near universal exception to this rule is school buses which are allowed to deploy rear and forward-facing stop signs and display alternatively phased flashing red lights just before, during, and after passenger loading and unloading as a signal for all other traffic to stop.
- In California, emergency vehicles must display at least one forward-facing steady-burn red light. Some exceptions are occasionally made for individual vehicles.
- In Iowa, Minnesota, and South Dakota red lights can also be used on a funeral hearse, but only during funerals.
- In Michigan, emergency road service vehicles such as tow trucks are allowed to use red warning lights only when stationary.
- In Minnesota and Wisconsin, tow trucks are required to be equipped with red lights but such lights may be operated only when the tow truck is standing on or near the traveled portion of a highway preparatory to towing or servicing a disabled vehicle.
- In Missouri, Colorado, tow trucks and road service vehicles, volunteer firefighters and EMS may use red and blue. Electric companies may use red.
- In New York, emergency vehicles must only display red lighting to the front and sides of the vehicle, with white lighting being optional. Blue lights are only permitted to be displayed to the rear or for use by volunteer firefighters or federal law enforcement.
- In Texas and Washington state, red lights are used on tow trucks, but only if the vehicle is not in motion. Most tow trucks mount rear-facing red lights to be used in sync with the vehicle's normal stop lights.
- In Wisconsin emergency light allows volunteer firefighters and/or emergency medical responders to use red or red/white lighting on their personal vehicles, only when responding to an emergency and/or the fire hall, not returning. No other vehicles in Wisconsin are permitted to use red and blue police lights on department or personal vehicles.

==== Amber or yellow ====
- Often used by utility vehicles such as construction vehicles, garbage trucks, semi-trucks Super-LED mini lightbar, 16" Permanent Mount - Amber w/Clear Dome and amber marker lights and semi-trucks with big and long trailers, snow plows, funeral escorts and hearses, security patrol vehicles, postal vehicles or other vehicles which may be stopped or moving slower than the flow of traffic.
- Amber is usually the most permissively regulated color.
- Tow trucks are required to be equipped with amber lights but such lights may be operated only 48 inch LED rooftop emergency strobe warning lights bar w/adjustable mounting brackets-white amber lighting except for four amber/white LED's mounted in the grille and turn signal light side view mirror LEDs.
- An amber flashing beacon is compulsory for any vehicle running 'Airside' on any airport. Any vehicle not so fitted, such as an ambulance responding to a medical emergency on an aircraft, has to be accompanied by one so fitted.

==== White ====
Required flashing white beacon on top of school buses for a strobe light flashing at the proper period can appear to freeze or have a reverse cyclical motion.

- Often used as an optional color on lightbars, usually in combination with other colors to increase visibility, though it may be restricted to emergency vehicles in some states. (Note: Alabama, Arkansas, Colorado, Georgia, Iowa, Illinois, Michigan, Texas, Wisconsin, Minnesota, Mississippi, Missouri, Nevada, West Virginia, South Carolina, South Dakota, Louisiana, and Utah combination with other colors to increase visibility) Some lightbars include separate or integrated steady burn white lights that face forward ("takedown lights") or to the sides ("alley lights") to allow for better visibility of objects around the vehicle at night.
- White is rarely used as the only color on a lightbar, though some states (Note: Alabama, Arkansas, Rhode Island, Florida, Georgia, Illinois, Michigan, Wisconsin, Minnesota, Maryland, West Virginia, South Dakota, Texas, Louisiana, and Kentucky require LED flashing white strobe on school buses) require LED flashing white strobe lights beacons on the rear of school buses as a rear-end collision prevention measure.
- An above door mounted light system designed to light up the walking area around school buses. Contains 8 extremely bright CREE LEDs producing 800 Lumens of brilliant white light. Available as Passenger side, Driver side and as a pair (Passenger/Driver Side set).
- Historically, white was used in combination with red bulb lenses in the Federal Signal Corporation Beacon Ray rotating beacon, introduced in 1948 and the later 1960s and 1970s model P A lights equipped with clear domes on through the 1980s, when revolving bulb and reflector type emergency lighting including the later 1970s Twinsonic and Aerodynic lightbars were supplanted with newer strobe types. The four bulb Beacon Ray Model 175 with a clear dome and colored lenses over the bulbs were used extensively in the 1960s by the NYPD with two red bulbs alternated with a white bulb and an amber bulb canted upwards at a 45-degree angle so the amber flash would reflect off upper-floor building windows for added traffic attention/visibility. This clear dome/colored bulb lens combination also found extensive use across the US as fire apparatus and ambulance lighting.
- Certain railroad-related machines, like fueling tankers, locomotive fuelling service-stations, track maintenance and switching engines, may also use a flashing white light.
- In some states, certain government vehicles such as rural mail delivery vehicle use a flashing white beacon. (Note: Alabama, Arkansas, California, Rhode Island, Florida, Georgia, Illinois, Michigan, Montana, Maine, Maryland, Nevada, South Dakota, Tennessee, Texas, Louisiana, Kentucky, and Wyoming require LED flashing white strobe on mail delivery vehicle)

==== Green ====
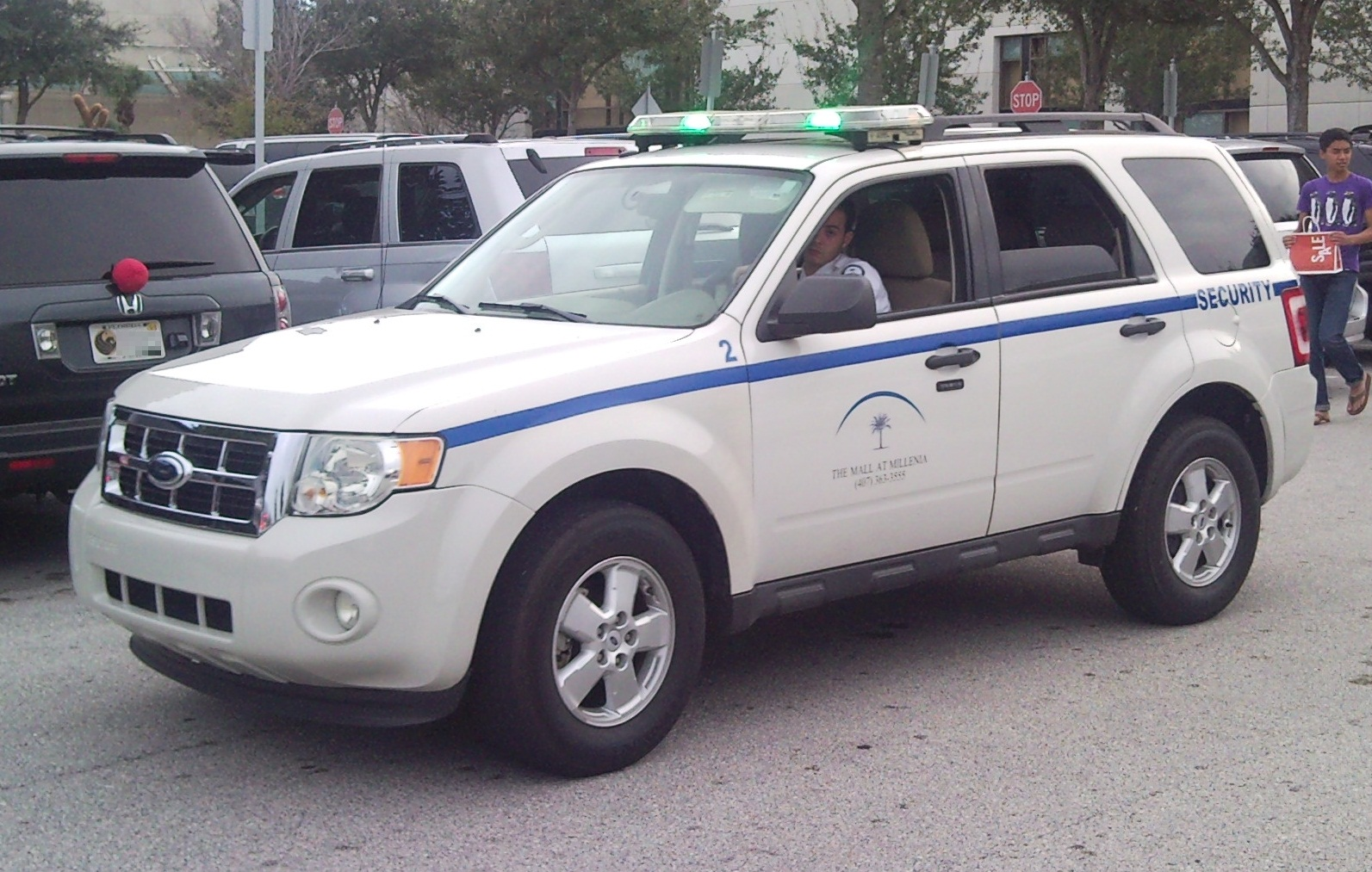
A modern security vehicle using green lights in a mall in Florida

- Since 9/11, green is used by Homeland Security Agencies and government/private security agencies protecting high risk government and critical infrastructure.
- Green emergency lighting is used on vehicles which are protecting nuclear facilities, oil & gas depots, water storage facilities and dams, gas pipelines, airports, defense facilities, maritime facilities, and all other areas which are at a high risk of terrorist attacks.
- Green emergency lighting is also used by private security agencies securing certain government buildings and establishments where terrorist organizations may also target. However, in the State of Florida, green is allowed for use by all private security vehicles only in combination with amber lights. (Florida state legislation is pending to also allow flashing clear/white lights in combination with amber/green security patrol lights for added visibility.)
- Green and blue emergency lighting is used by some counter-terrorism agencies whilst responding to terrorist incidents, so as to distinguish the specialist agencies from other emergency departments.
- In Arkansas, Minnesota and Wisconsin, Green lights are used by Emergency Management personnel.
- The Chicago Fire Department as well as the San Francisco Fire Department traditionally place one or more flashing or solid green light elements on the right front of their apparatus, alongside the usual red flashing lights. In the case of the SFFD, this is done to identify other apparatus' from a TDA, or tractor drawn aerial (also known as a tiller truck), as seen on page 16 of this report. This practice is also observed by other fire rescue agencies in the Chicago region.
- In Michigan, flashing or oscillating green lights denote municipal vehicles actively removing ice, snow, or other materials from roads. Law also allows Fire Department vehicles use of green flashing, rotating, or oscillating lights.
- In New York, Connecticut and Indiana, volunteer ambulance service personnel use green lights.
- In New York City, a single flashing green light separated from the other red and blue flashing lights on an NYPD vehicle denotes it as a THV (Temporary Headquarters Vehicle) also known as a Mobile Command Post vehicle and also used on a 2-star Assistant Chiefs marked RMP (Radio Motor Patrol) vehicle to identify it as such.
- In Oregon, and some other states, the ‘command’ vehicle at a fire scene may use a green light to identify its location.
- In Ohio, snowplows used by the Ohio Department of Transportation use a combination of green and amber lights.
- In Puerto Rico, green and blue is used by Homeland & National Security agencies by Municipal Police Forces in addition to counter-terrorism security agencies.
- In Tennessee, motorcycles in funeral processions use green lights.
- In Washington State, under the provisions of RCW 46.37.185, a firefighter may use a green light on their privately owned vehicle with the approval of the fire chief of the department they are employed by. The green light is used for identification purposes only and does not convey any special rights or status to the vehicle.

==== Blue ====
- Reserved for law enforcement, firefighters and EMS.
- In the United States, a single emergency vehicle blocking a right-of-way could have as many as eight warning lights flashing 75 times per minute with different colors and levels of intensity, as well as different flash patterns and synchronization.
- Alaska, Arizona, Colorado, Minnesota, and Nebraska also use blue lights on snowplows.
- In Arkansas and Kentucky, civilian possession of a blue flashing light is prohibited by state law. Additionally, blue is the color used by law enforcement agencies.
- In California, all emergency vehicles just use red warning lights, with 1 steady red warning light facing forward. Blue lights may only be used on vehicles operated by Peace Officers, as defined under California Penal Code 830.1 to 830.38. (California Vehicle Code 25258(b)) -Commonly referred to as "California Standard".
- Chicago Police utilizes blue lighting for law enforcement.
- In Delaware, Delaware State Trooper cars use all red/blue lighting two red/blue LED's mounted in the grille. The exception to this is the motor carrier enforcement vehicles which use all red/blue lighting. Ambulance and fire use red/blue warning lights.
- In Florida, normally have blue lighting prohibited by state law for law enforcement and red lighting for fire and EMS vehicles.
- In Hawaii, blue lights are prohibited on any vehicle except those used by law enforcement. Several departments allow senior officers to drive personal vehicles subsidized by the department to offset the cost of maintaining fleet vehicles. Those vehicles are required to use a department provided lightbar with a steady burning blue light to indicate when they are on duty, and capable of flashing when responding to an emergency.
- In Illinois, paid and unpaid volunteers of a local or county emergency management services agency are able to use blue lights, provided they are authorized in writing and carry that with them in their vehicle, along with carrying identification of their affiliation.
- In Minnesota, Minnesota State Trooper cars use all red/blue lighting two red/blue LED's mounted in the grille. The exception to this is the motor carrier enforcement vehicles which use all red/blue lighting and red/blue lighting for fire and EMS vehicles.
- In Montana, Montana State Trooper cars use all red/blue lighting. The exception to this is the motor carrier enforcement vehicles which use all red lighting and red lighting for fire and EMS vehicles.
- Most New England States do not have a legislation regulating with the color of lights on emergency vehicles with the exception of Massachusetts. Massachusetts police vehicles would have a full blue/white lightbar front and rear with the addition of one red/amber lights facing rear of the vehicle; fire departments would have red lights facing front and rear with one blue/amber light facing rear only and should normally have led road flares emergency lights roadside warning. Maine, New Hampshire, and Vermont use blue lighting for police and red lighting for EMT and fire. The rest of the New England States have red/blue for law enforcement, EMTs and fire.
- In Nevada police utilizes red/blue lightbar for law enforcement and red/blue lighting for fire and EMS vehicles.
- In New Mexico, New Mexico State Trooper cars use all red lighting. All emergency vehicles in New Mexico use Red warning lights, with some local municipalities using a red/blue combination. Tow trucks may have blue lights in combination with amber.
- In New York State, lightbars installed on New York State Police vehicles are designed to increase visibility horizontal red and vertical blue lightbar on vehicles. Forward facing blue lights are not permitted on any emergency vehicles, an anomaly in the US. The only exceptions to this is on the personal vehicles of volunteer firefighters, which are allowed to display forward facing flashing blue lights when responding to an emergency or federal emergency vehicles such as those used by Homeland Security.
- In New Jersey. All emergency vehicles are permitted the use of red/blue warning lights.
- In North Dakota, North Dakota State Trooper cars use all blue lighting. The exception to this is the motor carrier enforcement vehicles which use all red lighting and red lighting for fire and EMS vehicles.
- In Ohio, Ohio State Trooper cars use all blue lighting except for two red LED's mounted in the grille. The exception to this is the motor carrier enforcement vehicles which use all red lighting. Ambulance and fire personnel use red warning lights.
- In Oklahoma, any emergency vehicle may use a combination of red/blue warning lights, with the rural area police departments primarily using all blue lights and rural ambulance and fire using red.
- In Pennsylvania, the display of a combination of red and blue lights dictate a police vehicle. Only police, sheriff, coroner, or fire police vehicle may use a combination of red and blue warning lights. i.e.: Pennsylvania State Police, municipal police, county detectives (DA Office), sheriff, railroad police, college police, humane or SPCA police, hospital police, bridge police, transit police, State constables, etc. The single color blue light is reserved as a courtesy light for volunteer firefighters when responding to an emergency incident and/or fire house. There may not be any other colors present and no more than 2 flashing or revolving lights/bulbs, further it must have 360 degrees of visibility. Civilians are not required but are generally encouraged to move over when only blue light is present. Fire and ambulances are only permitted red warning lights, although the Fire Chief may use red lights and sirens on their personally owned vehicle. Tow trucks and construction, and/or road crews may only use amber.
- In South Carolina, normally have blue lighting prohibited by state law for law enforcement and red lighting for fire and EMS vehicles.
- In Texas, red and blue may be used on any emergency vehicle. Texas rural sheriff offices tend to favor all blue warning lights, while city or municipality tend to favor a red/blue combination. Fire and ambulances may use a combination of red/blue warning lights. University police department use red and blue in combination. Highway maintenance vehicles display amber.
- In Washington, DC, police operate vehicles with blue/white and red/blue emergency lights, as opposed to fire and ambulance who use a red and white combination warning light.
- In Wisconsin, Wisconsin State Trooper cars use all red/blue lighting except for two red/blue LED's mounted in the grille. The exception to this is the motor carrier enforcement vehicles (micro slim ultra mini LED lightbar) which use all red/blue lighting. Ambulance and fire personnel use red/blue warning lights.

==== Purple ====
Purple is permitted in some states to denote a funeral vehicle specifically additional Wig-Wag lights (separate from the headlights) are used on funeral vehicle can use purple lights and/or coroner's or Medical examiner's office.

==== Police ====
Police agencies may use red, blue, or both, depending on the state, along with white and amber as optional colors; although amber is usually restricted to face behind the vehicle. Some police cars have an amber directional control bar, also known as an ‘arrow stick’ or a ‘traffic advisor’, located on the back facing part of the lightbar to direct traffic left or right around the vehicle; these usually have 6 or 8 rear-facing lights that flash in sequence.

Some privately operated special police are allowed to display the same colors as regular police, generally, if they receive their special police authority at the state level. This can include railroad, university, hospital, and SPCA and humane society police departments, Animal control and regulatory officers, Fish and Wildlife conservation officers and Federal and State park rangers, and Beach Safety lifeguards that are law enforcement certified.

==== Fire and EMS ====
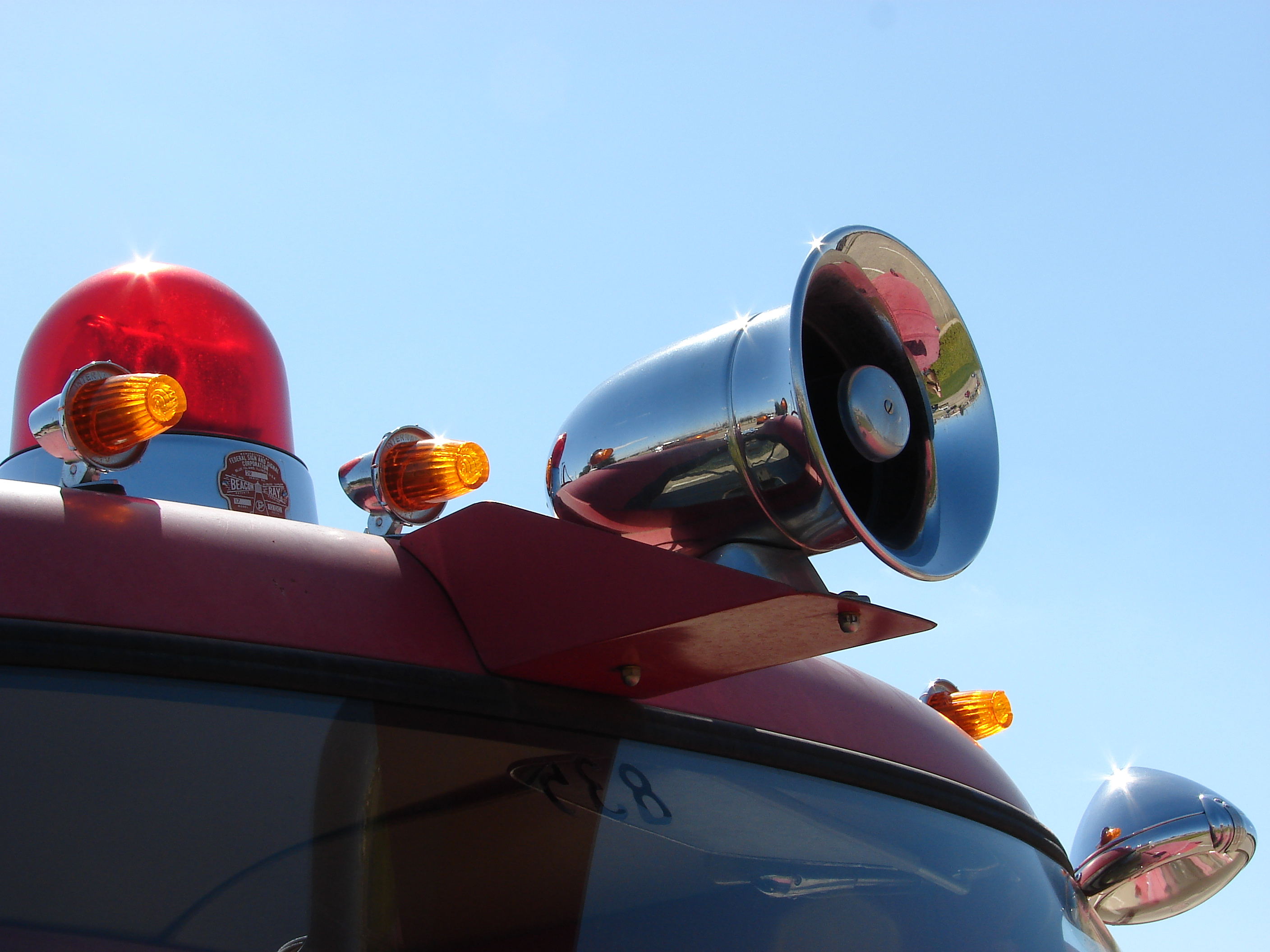
1960s-70s era Fire truck with Federal signal Beacon Ray emergency light and siren mounted on top

Fire and emergency medical services generally use red lights with amber and white as optional colors. Vehicles operated by fire departments, such as fire engines and heavy rescue vehicles, prominently use red, a color with strong cultural associations with the fire service, along with some amber and white. Some more modern fire trucks and airport crash units use a yellow-green color, however.

Many fire chiefs’ cars have, in addition to the red lights, a single green beacon to indicate command post status. On the other hand, in Chicago and some nearby communities, fire vehicles show a green light on the right, or starboard, side of the vehicle. This initially was in relation to nautical tradition but has since become tied to a sense of courage and the remembrance of fallen firefighters

Emergency medical vehicles, such as ambulances and paramedic fly-cars, generally use white, amber, and red as well. Some states have a specific rule authorizing light colors for EMS vehicles, while some EMS vehicles ‘inherit’ their light colors from the fire or police department they are operated by or contracted to, and may show blue lights.

The National Fire Protection Association publishes the NFPA-1901 standards for fire vehicles, which specifies the degree of lighting on various parts of the vehicles, with some flexibility as to color. There is also a GSA procurement specification for ambulances known as KKK-A-1822-F, which many local authorities follow.

==== Volunteer personnel ====
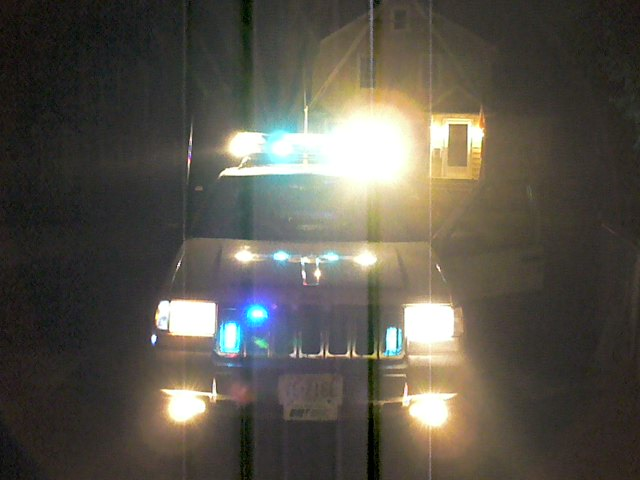
A New Jersey EMT's vehicle at night with lights flashing

Many U.S. states allow volunteer fire, EMS and search & rescue personnel to place emergency warning lights in their personal vehicles for use when responding to emergencies. The degree of lighting is mandated by law and also by local custom in most areas, and can vary from a single rotating light on the dashboard or roof, to a setup much like modern police cruisers. Some states also allow volunteer use of sirens and air horns to request the right of way.

Virginia state law allows emergency personnel to equip one private vehicle "with no more than two flashing or steady-burning red or red and white combination warning lights".

In some states, volunteers are allowed to use the normal red lights, while in other states volunteers must use some other color, usually blue or green. In the latter case, the lights are used as a courtesy to ‘request’ the right of way and generally do not mandate pulling over. Some states, such a Pennsylvania, limit volunteer use of red lights to chiefs and captains of squads.

Separate colors may be used for fire versus EMS volunteers. In Connecticut, Indiana, Minnesota, and New York, volunteer firefighters use blue while volunteer EMTs use green. In New Jersey, volunteer fire and ambulance personnel use blue lights in their personal vehicles while responding to their stations. In NJ red lights are only allowed for emergency vehicles, fire chiefs, chief officers of first aid or rescue squads, or other law enforcement vehicles. In Iowa, volunteer firefighters can use flashing blue lights on their personal vehicles, while volunteer EMTs can use flashing white (clear) lights.

New York also certifies some volunteer EMTs to use red lights and sirens provided their vehicles carry certain equipment; this is often used by Hatzolah volunteers in the NYC area. Typically in New York state, volunteer firefighters use blue lights in their personal vehicles and volunteer EMS use green lights. This may generate confusion, as green lights are also used to signify an incident command vehicle. In the state of Texas, “a private vehicle of a volunteer firefighter or a certified emergency medical services employee or volunteer when responding to a fire alarm or medical emergency” is considered an “authorized emergency vehicle” and may use alternately flashing lighting equipment or may be equipped with a siren, exhaust whistle, or bell.

The conflicting color assignments can create issues for volunteers who drive their vehicles out of state. One color in their state may mean firefighter or EMT when in another state it may mean police. While some authorities may be satisfied with covering the lights with an ‘Out Of Service’ tarpaulin, compliance may be more difficult in other jurisdictions. For example, Arkansas bars civilian possession of blue lights on or in a vehicle unless sealed in the manufacturer's original package.

==== Utility vehicles ====
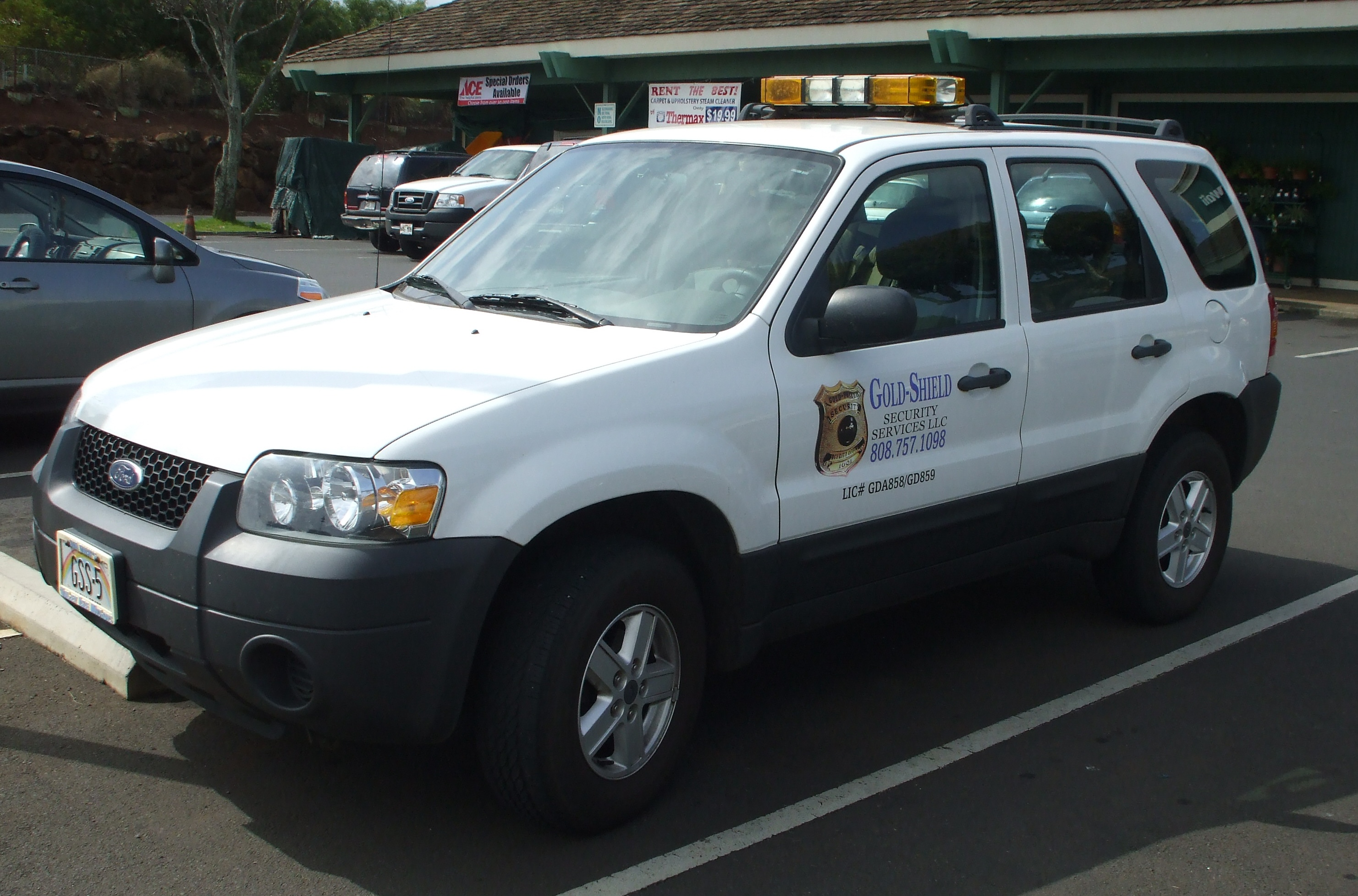
Private security car with amber/yellow lightbar on top

Amber lights are often used on vehicle involved in non-emergency work. Most utility companies, towing services, oversize load vehicles, slow vehicles, and certain types of construction equipment mount some type of lightbar or lighting system for a higher degree of visibility.

In Detroit, Michigan, Angels' Night volunteers will patrol neighborhoods with yellow lights to help deter vandalism during Devil's Night and Halloween. Typically these lights are the single beacon kind, although lightbars have been used for vehicles of this type, especially on wreckers/tow trucks.

In Memphis, Tennessee, Minneapolis, Minnesota and Saint Paul, Minnesota most city maintenance vehicles (including MLG&W utility trucks) with flashing lights use yellow lights; however, some vehicles with the traffic engineering department use red flashing lights, especially vehicles equipped with cherry pickers used to repair traffic signals.

In states that do not enforce specific rules about green, yellow or white lights, these colors are often used by entities like private security companies which may be ineligible to use blue or red lights but need emergency lights for traffic and site visibility. Security vehicles generally use their lights on private property, in addition some security vehicles are off-road only such as ATV, Golf cart type vehicles and in most jurisdictions security vehicles are generally not allowed a ‘courtesy’ or ‘emergency’ status on public roads.

==== Optional colors ====
While certain colors are customarily used by different services, often other colors are optionally used, such as amber and white. Sometimes, this is done to satisfy particular regulations; for example, California requires a steady red light facing forward and a flashing amber light to the rear on every emergency vehicle.

== See also ==
- Automotive lighting
- Emergency vehicle equipment

== Sources ==
- Road Vehicles Lighting Regulations 1989 (SI No. 1796). United Kingdom. November 1, 1989.
