= Trunk roads in Wales =

Major roads in Wales

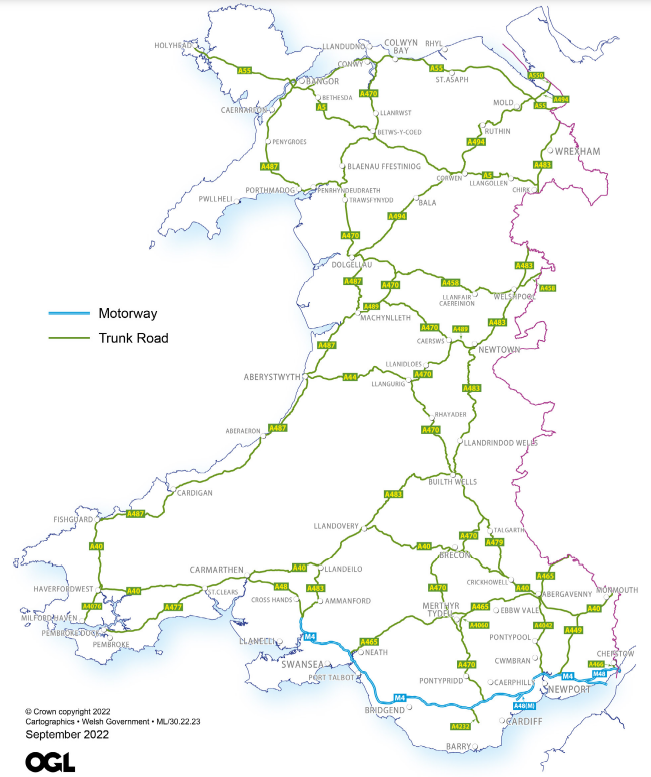
The current Trunk Road Network in Wales

Trunk roads in Wales were created in the Trunk Roads Act of 1936 when the UK Ministry of Transport took direct control over 30 of the principal roads in Great Britain from English, Welsh and Scottish local authorities. The number of trunk roads was increased from 30 to 101 in the Trunk Roads Act of 1946. These roads formed what the Act called "the national system of routes for through traffic". Since Welsh devolution the trunk road system in Wales has been managed by the South Wales Trunk Road Agent and the North and Mid Wales Trunk Road Agent on behalf of the Welsh Government. As of April 2019, out of a total of 34,850 miles (56,090 km) of roads in Wales, 1,576 miles (2,536 km) are trunk roads (including 135 miles (217 km) of motorways and as of 2015 350 miles (560 km) of dual carriageway).

Historically, trunk roads have been listed on maps with a "(T)" after their number, to distinguish them from non-trunk parts of the same road. However, this suffix is no longer included on current Ordnance Survey maps. The North and Mid Wales Trunk Road Agent still use it to distinguish the trunk road from a non-trunk road. When a trunk road had been improved by a motorway, bypass or a similar route, it may be de-trunked. When a road is de-trunked, signposts are often replaced, and sometimes route numbers are changed, making the original road harder to follow. The London–Fishguard Trunk Road in 1936 only included the A48 and the A40. With road improvements, most notably the M4 motorway, much of both the A48 and the A40 has been de-trunked

== Under UK Parliamentary control ==
The 1936 Act came into force in Wales on 1 April 1937 and created 30 trunk roads in Great Britain, with 5 roads either completely or partially within Wales. The Act excluded roads in the County of London and Northern Ireland. The 1946 Act came into force in Wales on 1 April 1946 and produced a further 71 with 11 either completely or partially within Wales. This Act included roads within the County of London, but still excluded the City of London.

Trunk roads in Wales created by the Trunk Road Act 1936
Trunk road number	Route of trunk road	Name of trunk road including road classification
10	From London–Chepstow–Caerwent Bypass–Penhow Bypass–Llanbeder Bypass–Newport–St Mellons–Cardiff–Cowbridge–Bridgend Bypass–Port Talbot–Neath–Swansea–Penllergaer–Pontarddulais–Llanddarog Bypass–Carmarthen–St Clears–Whitland–Haverfordwest–Wolf's Castle–Fishguard Harbour.	London–Fishguard Trunk Road (A40, A48)
11	From London–Chirk–Llangollen–Corwen–Cerrigydrudion–Betws-y-Coed–Bethesda–Llandygai–Bangor–Llanfairpwllgwyngyll–Gwalchmai–Valley–Holyhead Harbour.	London–Holyhead Trunk Road (A5)
17	Newport–Croesyceiliog–North West of Pontypool Road Station-Pont y Pia–Penperlleni–Llanellen–Coldbrook Park-Abergavenny–Llantilio Pertholey–Pandy–to Shrewsbury	Newport–Shrewsbury Trunk Road (A4042, A472, A40, A465)
18	Swansea–Penllergaer–Pontarddulais–Fforest–Tycroes–Ammanford–Llandybie–Llandeilo–Llanwrda–Llandovery Station–Llanwrtyd Wells–Beulah–Garth–Builth Wells–Llandrindod Wells–Llanbister–Maes-yr-helm–Gwynant–Dolfor–Glascoed–Newtown–Garthmyl–Welshpool–Llanymynech–Oswestry–Gobowen–Chirk–Plas Offa–The Green–Ruabon–Wrexham–to Manchester	Swansea–Manchester Trunk Road (A483, A48, A5, A539)
19	From Chester–Saltney–Hawarden–Northop Bypass–Holywell Bypass–St Asaph–Abergele–Colwyn Bay–Mochdre Bypass–Conwy–Penmaenmawr–Llandygai	Chester–Bangor Trunk Road (A55)
Sources: Legislation.gov.uk, Trunk Roads Act 1936 Leslie V Watson, Trunk Roads Act 1936 and 1946 What Do They Know, Welsh Government: List of Welsh Government Roads and Classifications

Trunk Roads in Wales created by the Trunk Road Act 1946
Trunk road number	Route of trunk road	Name of trunk road including road classification
75	Cardiff–Pontypridd–Merthyr Tydfil–Brecon–Pont-y-bat Crossroads–Llyswen–Builth Wells–Newbridge-on-Wye–Rhayader–Llangurig	Cardiff–Llangurig Trunk Road (A470, A40, A438, A4073, A479, A44)
76	Neath–Glynneath–Hirwaun–Merthyr Tydfil–Tredegar–Brynmawr–Abergavenny	Neath–Abergavenny Trunk Road (A465)
77	Raglan–Abergavenny–Brecon–Sennybridge–Llandovery	Raglan–Llandovery Trunk Road (A40)
78	Newport–Caerleon–Usk–Raglan–Monmouth–Wilton–Ross-on-Wye–Ledbury–Great Malvern–Worcester	Newport–Worcester Trunk Road (A449, A40, A4136, A466, A449)
79	Llandeilo–Carmarthen	Llandilo–Carmarthen Trunk Road (A40)
80	Haverfordwest–Milford Haven	Haverfordwest–Milford Haven Trunk Road (A4076)
81	Fishguard–Cardigan–Aberaeron–Aberystwyth–Machynlleth–Dolgellau–Maentwrog–Penrhyndeudraeth–Minffordd–West of Tremadog–Llanwnda–Caernarfon–North-east of Port Dinorwic–Menai Suspension Bridge	Fishguard–Bangor (Menai Suspension Bridge) Trunk Road (A487, A497, A498, A4085, A499, A4087)
82	Newtown–Llanidloes–Llangurig–Ponterwyd–Aberystwyth	Newtown–Aberystwyth Trunk Road (A492, A44)
83	West of Shrewsbury (Shelton)–Middletown–Buttington–Welshpool–Llanfair Caereinion–Mailwyd–Cross Foxes	Shrewsbury–Dolgellau Trunk Road (A458)
84	Dolgellau–Bala–Druid–Tyn y Cefn–Mold–Ewloe–Queensferry–to South of Birkenhead	Dolgellau–South of Birkenhead Trunk Road (A494, A549, B5123, A550, A548)
85	Felin Ty’n y Nant–Ffestiniog railway station–Ffestiniog–Manod railway station–Blaenau Ffestiniog–Dolwyddelan–Waterloo Bridge–Betws-y-Coed–Llanrwst–North of Glan Conwy	Maentwrog–East of Conwy Trunk Road (B4408, B4395, B4408, A496)
Sources: Legislation.gov.uk, Trunk Roads Act 1946 Leslie V Watson, Trunk Roads Act 1936 and 1946 What Do They Know, Welsh Government: List of Welsh Government Roads and Classifications

Trunk Roads in Wales created since 1946
Trunk road number	Route of trunk road	Name of trunk road including road classification
104	Glanusk Park–Llyswen	Glanusk Park (Crickhowell)–Llyswen Trunk Road (A479)
105	Caersws–Machynlleth	Caersws–Machynlleth Trunk Road A489
106	Cemmaes Road–Mallwyd	Cemmaes Road–Mallwyd Trunk Road A489
107	Pentrebach–Dowlais	East of Abercynon–East of Dowlais Trunk Road A4060
122	St Clears–Red Roses–Kilgetty–Pembroke Dock	East of St Clears–Pembroke Dock Trunk Road A477
Source: What Do They Know, Welsh Government: List of Welsh Government Roads and Classifications

A review of roads was carried out in 1997–1998 by the Welsh Office, which was part of the Government of the United Kingdom. It reviewed the existing trunk road network and identified routes that were of national strategic importance. The factors for deciding which routes should be retained in the core (trunk) network included:

- Providing links between main centres of population, industry, tourist areas and important communities.
- Promoting safe, secure, predictable, and rapid movement of people and goods throughout Wales.
- Providing access to major seaports, airports, rail and bus terminals.
- Providing cross-border links to the English network
- Being part of the UK Trans-European road network.

These factors were published in the Government's white paper "A New Deal for Transport" in July 1998.

== Under Welsh Parliamentary control ==
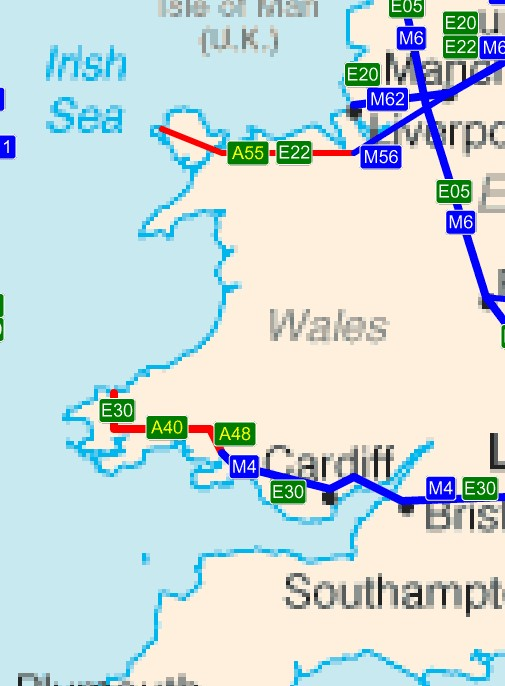
The two European routes in Wales (E30 in the south and E22 in the north) are also trunk roads

The National Assembly for Wales took responsibility for devolved powers on 1 July 1999, as part of this process, transport was transferred from the Parliament of the United Kingdom to the National Assembly for Wales and with it responsibility for the trunk road network, including motorways. Responsibility for the management of highways in Wales is split between the Welsh Government and local highway agencies. The Welsh Government is responsible for trunk roads and motorways, whilst the 22 local authorities are responsible for all other highways.

In 2001 the Welsh Government reviewed the way in which trunk roads and motorways were being managed, and by September 2004, they had decided to reduce the number of trunk road agencies from eight down to three. The three new agencies were:

- The South Wales Trunk Road Agency (SWTRA), later renamed the South Wales Trunk Road Agent
- The Mid Wales Trunk Road Agency (MWTRA)
- The North Wales Trunk Road Agency (NWTRA).

The three new Trunk Road Agencies started on 1 April 2006. Six years later on 1 April 2012 these were again reduced further down to two:

- The South Wales Trunk Road Agent, who manage 16 trunk roads or parts of roads (both A roads and motorways)
- The North and Mid Wales Trunk Road Agent (NMWTRA), who manage 11 trunk roads or parts of roads (all A roads).

Neath Port Talbot County Borough Council and Gwynedd Council manage and maintain the trunk road network on behalf of the Transport and Strategic Regeneration division of the Welsh Government for SWTRA and NMWTRA respectively.

In March 2002, the Welsh Government developed their Trunk Road Forward Programme. The programme listed plans for major improvements and new road schemes. Following the 2004 review of the Welsh Government's transport policy in 2004, they updated the list for major improvements and new road schemes. In December 2008 the Trunk Road Forward Programme was again updated due to the pledges made in the One Wales the Labour Party and Plaid Cymru.

As of April 2019, out of a total of 34,850 miles (56,090 km) of roads in Wales, 1,576 miles (2,536 km) are trunk roads (including 135 miles (217 km) of motorways and as of 2015 350 miles (560 km) of dual carriageway).

In 2023, the Welsh Government announced it was expecting more interventional schemes would be required in the future to tackle long-standing air quality issues. This could be possibly road pricing on some of Wales' trunk roads, like London's ULEZ. Although, a minister stated there are no current plans to introduce them. Starting in March 2023, the Welsh Government were drafting a bill to expand their powers to implement road pricing, should they need it.

== Present-day trunk roads ==
Trunk roads in Wales
Name of trunk road	Road classification (A road / Motorway)	Notes	Image
M4 motorway (in Wales). It forms part of the London–Fishguard Trunk Road and also the European route E30		Although part of the European route E30, the directional signs omit the European route numbers. It is mostly a 3-lane motorway apart from junctions 24 to 26 around Newport and from junction 38 around Port Talbot until the western terminus of the M4 at junction 49 at the Pont Abraham services, where it is a 2-lane motorway in each direction.	The M4, near Cardiff
M48 motorway (in Wales)		The M48 was previously part of the M4 motorway, until it was renamed when the Second Severn Crossing was built in 1996. It is a 2-lane motorway in each direction.	The M48, near Caldicot
A48(M) motorway		The A48(M) opened in 1977 originally as an ending for the M4. The M4 was subsequently extended from junction 29 in 1980, and this section of road was subsequently renumbered the A48(M). It is a 2-lane motorway in each direction.	The A48(M), near Cardiff
Dolgellau–South of Birkenhead Trunk Road (A494)		The road runs south west (mid Wales) to north east Wales. It is mostly a single-carriageway road apart from a section between Queensferry and the M56 motorway where it is dual-carriageway road.	The A494, near Queensferry
London–Fishguard Trunk Road. Forms part of the European route E30 (A40, A48, A466, M4 motorway).		The A40 forms part of the Welsh Government's East to West network of trunk roads linking Abergavenny with Fishguard in Wales. The A40 is predominantly a single carriageway in Wales apart from a section between Carmarthen and St Clears. Forms part of the 6,050 kilometres (3,760 miles) European route E30 from Cork (Ireland) to Omsk (Russia).	The A40, near Abergwili
Cardiff–Glan Conwy Trunk Road (A470)		The A470 is a north–south route running from Llandudno Junction and the A55 in the north to Cardiff on the south coast. It is generally a single-carriageway road north of Merthyr Tydfil and dual carriageway south of Merthyr Tydfil.	The A470, near Pontypridd
A4232 Trunk Road (Capel Llanilltern – Culverhouse Cross Link Road) (A4232)		A4232 Trunk Road was opened in 1985 and was designed to provide a link between the Vale of Glamorgan and the west of Cardiff on the A48 with the M4 motorway. It is 5.47 kilometres (3.40 miles) in length. The remainder of the A4232 road is not trunked.	The A4232 (Cardiff Link Road)
Raglan–Llandovery Trunk Road (A40)		The A40 is an east to west route in mid Wales from Raglan (Newport–Worcester Trunk Road) and Llandovery. It is mostly single carriageway standard apart from the Brecon Bypass, which is dual carriageway.	The A40 (Brecon Bypass)
East of Abercynon–East of Dowlais Trunk Road (A4060)		The A4060 is a mix of dual carriageway and single carriageway. It links the Cardiff–Glan Conwy Trunk Road (A470) to the south of Merthyr Tydfil, where it is a 3-lane single carriageway to the Neath–Abergavenny Trunk Road (A465) at Dowlais Top, where it is a dual carriageway.	The A4060, near Pentrebach
Bangor–Chirk Trunk Road. Forms part of the London–Holyhead Trunk Road (A5)		The A5 London to Holyhead road is a trunk road in Wales running from Bangor in the north west through to Chirk in the south east of the region. The A5 is predominantly a single carriageway in Wales.	The A5 (Chirk Bypass)
Swansea–Manchester Trunk Road (A483)		Between the junction of the A55 and Ruabon in north Wales, the road is dual carriageway. The remainder of the road is single carriageway.	The A483 (Gresford Bypass)
Chester–Bangor Trunk Road, also known as the Holyhead–Chester Trunk Road and the North Wales Expressway. It forms part of the European route E22. (A55)		The A55 trunk road is the main east–west route in North Wales. The road is some 129 km (81 miles) in length, It is a dual carriageway and includes the Britannia Bridge and the A55 tunnels. West of Junction 11 (across Anglesey) is managed by UK Highways Ltd as part of a private finance initiative and east of Junction 35a (in England) is managed by Highways England. It forms part of the 5,320 kilometres (3,310 miles) European route E22 that links Ishim (Russia) with Holyhead	The A55, near Colwyn Bay
Neath–Abergavenny Trunk Road, also known as the Heads of the Valleys Road (A465)		The road is a main east–west route in South Wales along with the M4 motorway. Large sections of the road are dual-carriageway, with the remainder being single-carriageway. The Welsh Government has promised that the dualling of the whole trunk road in Wales will be complete by 2025.	The A465, near Bute Town
Newport–Worcester Trunk Road (A449)		This road is the main road from South Wales to English Midlands.	The A449, near Newport
Newport–Shrewsbury Trunk Road (A4042 road)		The trunk road is the main south–north route in eastern Wales.	The A4042, (Llantarnam Bypass)
Shrewsbury–Dolgellau Trunk Road (also known as the Shropshire Boundary–Mallwyd Trunk Road) (A458)		The road is an east–west route in mid Wales connecting the London–Holyhead Trunk Road (A5) in the east near Shrewsbury to the Cardiff–Glan Conwy Trunk Road (A470) in the west near Mallwyd. It is a single-carriageway road.	The A458, near Mallwyd
Haverfordwest–Milford Haven Trunk Road (A4076)		The road is a small north–south road linking the London – Fishguard Trunk Road (A40) at Haverfordwest to the port of Milford Haven. It is a single-carriageway road.	The A4076, near Merlin's Bridge
Fishguard–Bangor Trunk Road (A487)		The A487 is a south–north roads running through the west Wales, linking Fishguard in Pembrokeshire with Bangor in north Wales. It is a single-carriageway road.	The A487 (Caernarfon Inner Relief Road)
Newtown–Machynlleth Trunk Road (A489)		The A489 is an east–west route. It runs from Newtown to Machynlleth and is split into two distinct lengths. The southern section is 8.5 km (5 miles) in length links the A483 road at Newtown to the A470 road at Caersws. The Northern section is 9 km (5.5 miles) in length and links the A470 at Cemmaes Road to the A487 road at Machynlleth. The A470 and A489 are both mostly single-carriageway roads.	The A489, near Abergwydol
Newtown–Aberystwyth Trunk Road (A44)		The A44 is an east–west route running from the A470 at Llangurrig to Aberystwyth. The road is entirely a single-carriage, linking the A483 road at Newtown to the A470 road at Caersws.	The A44, near Llangurig
Glanusk Park (Crickhowell)–Llyswen Trunk Road (A479)		The A479 from the A40 near Crickhowell to the A470 at Llyswen and is generally a single-carriageway road and is 21 km (13 miles) in length.	The A479 (Bronllys Bypass)
St Clears–Pembroke Dock Trunk Road (A477)		The east–west route from the junction of the London–Fishguard Trunk Road (A40) at St Clears to Pembroke Dock. In 2014, the St Clears to Red Roses improvement road was opened. Bypassing the communities of Llanddowror and Red Roses, this new road is a single carriageway with over half its length carrying three lanes.	The A477, (Llanddowror Bypass)
Source: What Do They Know, Welsh Government: List of Welsh Government Roads and Classifications

== See also ==
- Trunk road
- Trunk road agent
- Roads in the United Kingdom
- Transport in the United Kingdom
- List of motorways in the United Kingdom
