= Fforest =

Fforest is a Welsh word and frequent place-name element meaning 'forest'.

- For the Carmarthenshire village, west of Pontarddulais, see Hendy
- For the hill north of Llandovery, Carmarthenshire, see Fforest (Carmarthenshire)
