= A40 road =

Road in Great Britain, connecting London to Wales

A40

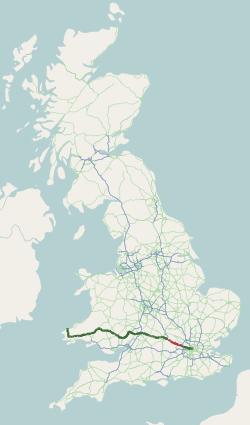

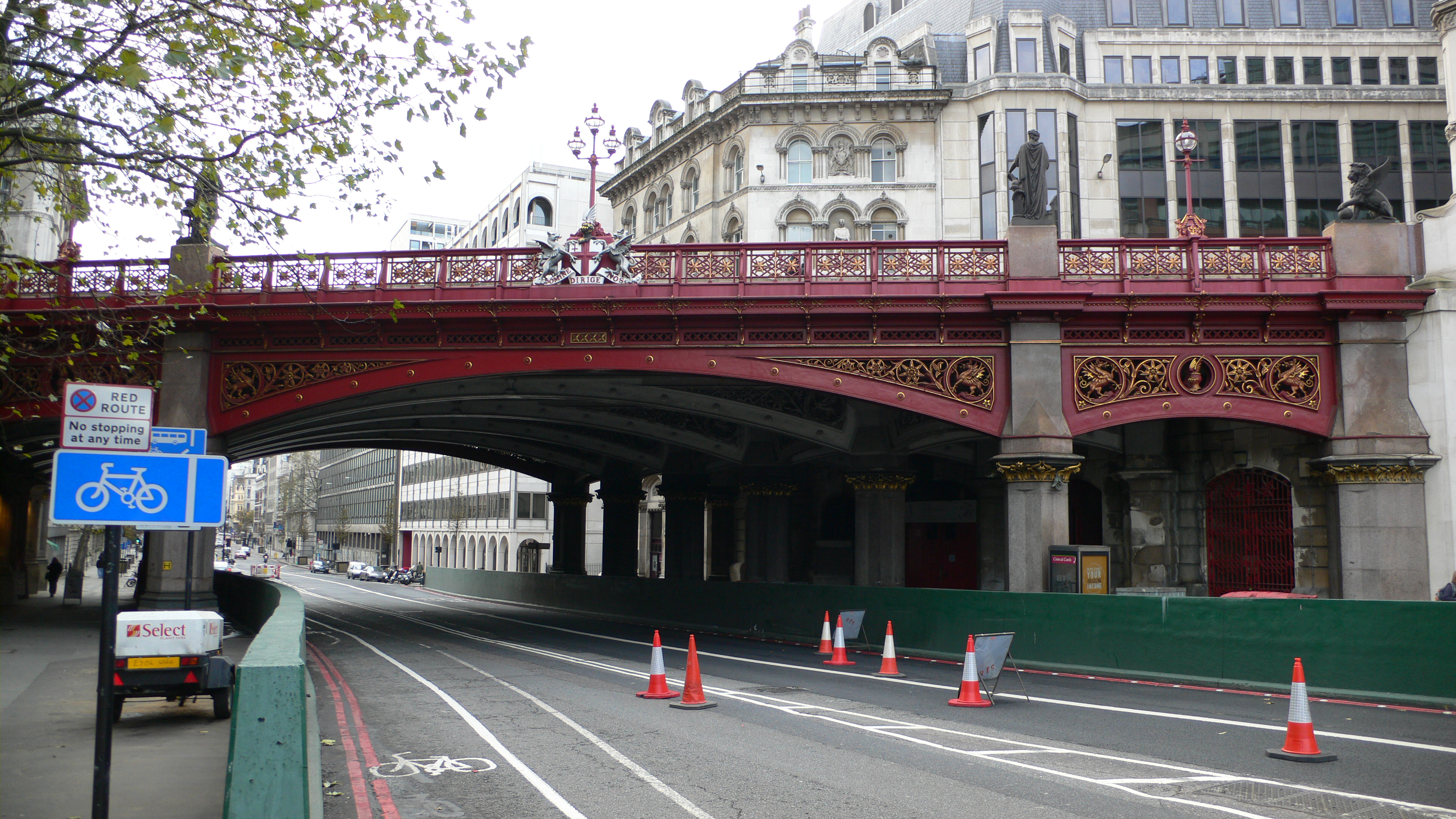
- Holborn Viaduct carries the A40

Route information
- Part of E30
- Maintained by National Highways, English local authorities, South Wales Trunk Road Agent and North & Mid Wales Trunk Road Agent
- Length: 261.2 mi (420.4 km)

Major junctions
- East end: A1 / A1121 in City of London

- see also: A40 road (London) A5 in Greater London M40 in Greater London; A34 / A44 near Oxford; M5 near Cheltenham; A38 in Gloucester; A48 near Gloucester; A49 at Bridstow
- West end: Goodwick (Fishguard)

Location
- Country: United Kingdom
- Counties: England: Greater London, Buckinghamshire, Oxfordshire, Gloucestershire, Herefordshire; Wales: Monmouthshire, Powys, Carmarthenshire, Pembrokeshire
- Primary destinations: London, Beaconsfield, High Wycombe, Oxford, Cheltenham, Gloucester, Ross-on-Wye, Monmouth, Abergavenny, Brecon, Llandovery, Llandeilo, Carmarthen, Haverfordwest, Fishguard

Road network
- Roads in the United Kingdom; Motorways; A and B road zones
| ← A39 | → A41 |

The A40 is a road which runs between London and Goodwick (Fishguard), in Wales. It is approximately 260 miles (420 km) long. The eastern section from Denham, Buckinghamshire to Wheatley, Oxfordshire is better served by the M40 and its former function of linking London with Cheltenham and Gloucester has been taken by the M4, A419 and A417 via Swindon.

In 1937, together with the A48 road, it formed parts of the London–Fishguard trunk road, as well as a part of the Newport–Shrewsbury trunk road. Much of the A40's length within England has been superseded by motorways, such as the M40, and has lost its trunk road status, though it retains the status west of Gloucester and its entirety within Wales.

== History ==
=== 18th century ===
==== Beaconsfield and Stokenchurch Turnpike ====
The road between Beaconsfield and Stokenchurch, that later became part of the A40, was put under the management of a turnpike trust by the Beaconsfield and Stokenchurch Road Act 1718 (5 Geo. 1. c. 2 Pr.)

=== 20th century ===
The A40's 1923 route was from the City of London to Fishguard. The road still begins and ends in the same places, but a number of changes have been made to its route.

On 1 April 1937, parts of the road and the A48 road was classed to form the London–Fishguard trunk road. Part of the road was also made part of the Newport–Shrewsbury trunk road.

The first change dates from 1935, between Ross-on-Wye and Abergavenny. The original route of the A40 was via Skenfrith, avoiding Monmouth; this road was renumbered the B4521. The A40 was rerouted via Raglan; between Ross and Raglan it replaced part of the A48, between Raglan and Llanvihangel-nigh-Usk it replaced the B4234, and between Llanvihangel and Abergavenny it replaced part of the A471.

Subsequently, the A40 was rerouted within west London. Western Avenue dates from the 1930s, but was originally opened as the A403. After the Second World War, the A40 was rerouted along part of the A219 (west of Notting Hill) and Western Avenue. The old route (via Acton, Ealing, Southall, Hayes, Hillingdon and Uxbridge) was renumbered the A4020.

Initially, the A40 went through the centre of Oxford, via Headington, Magdalen Bridge, the High Street, Carfax and Botley, and over the Swinford Toll Bridge to Eynsham. It was rerouted in the 1930s to follow the first section of the Oxford Ring Road to the north of the city, and then followed a direct line to bypass Eynsham. The old route became part of the A420 to Botley, and the section between Botley and Eynsham was renumbered the A4141, renumbered again in the 1960s to the B4044.

From the 1960s to 1990s a number of bypasses were built to divert the A40 around towns on the route, including Gloucester (1968), Monmouth (1964), Brecon (1980), Carmarthen (1984), St. Clears (1984), Whitland (1994),Witney.

In the mid-1980s a new dual carriageway was built for the A40 between Raglan and Abergavenny, and the 1935 route was renumbered the B4598.

== Route ==
=== Central London – Denham ===
In central London it is High Holborn and then Oxford Street. At Marble Arch it joins the A5 Edgware Road as far as the Marylebone Flyover to become Westway then meets Western Avenue. For the greater part, this section is six lanes, otherwise four lanes. With two exceptions, Western Avenue forms a grade-separated motorway standard dual-carriageway between Paddington and the M40 motorway. The two at-grade intersections are Gypsy Corner and Savoy Circus; both of which are traffic light controlled. At Denham Roundabout, the six lane Western Avenue flows into the M40.

=== Denham – Oxford ===
The A40 branches off the Denham roundabout to run as a dual carriageway. After the junction with the A413, the A40 follows the same route as the M40 as a single carriageway, passing through Beaconsfield and High Wycombe. Beyond Stokenchurch the road is much quieter; when meeting the B4009 and A329 those roads have priority. Approaching Oxford, the A40 becomes a busy dual carriageway, carrying traffic from the M40 to Oxford and beyond. The road forms the northern section of the Oxford Ring Road, crossing the A44 and the A34. In Oxford, it passes the Thornhill Park and Ride, where the OxfordTube, The Airline to Heathrow & Gatwick, & Oxford Park and Ride buses stop.

=== Oxford – Cheltenham (M5) ===
The A40 passes under the A34, reverting to single carriageway for 10 miles (16 km) until the dual carriageway just east of Witney with a grade-separated junction. The dual carriageway finishes at a roundabout. For the rest of Oxfordshire and Gloucestershire until Cheltenham, other than for a few short stretches, the road is single carriageway. A height of 820 feet (250 m) above sea level is located 3 miles (4.8 km) west of the A429 junction. Before Andoversford the A436 breaks off to the west to try to take traffic away from descending into the centre of Cheltenham itself. The road travels through Cheltenham town centre along at least two parallel routes (neither is part of a one-way system: Sandford Road and Montpellier Terrace make up one part, Thirlestaine Road and Suffolk Road the other). Becoming a dual carriageway, it passes GCHQ in Cheltenham and the three-level stacked roundabout interchange with the M5 motorway. In February 2015, the Witney Oxford Transport Group proposed the reopening of Yarnton railway station as an alternative to improvements to the A40 road proposed by Oxfordshire County Council.

=== Cheltenham (M5) – Abergavenny ===
The A40 is the Gloucester bypass, most of which is dual carriageway. The junction with the A48 to Chepstow is at Highnam. For the remainder of Gloucestershire, and a part of Herefordshire, the road is single carriageway until Ross-on-Wye. There it connects with the M50 motorway, and forms part of the high quality dual carriageway between South Wales and the English Midlands. From Ross-on-Wye to Monmouth the road follows the Wye Valley, an Area of Outstanding Natural Beauty, crossing the Wales–England border 1 mi (1.6 km) east of Monmouth. Just west of Monmouth are twin tunnels; these are the only tunnels on the A40. Near Raglan, the A40 has a grade separated junction with the A449. The A40 continues as a dual carriageway to Abergavenny.

==== Abergavenny – M50 junctions ====
A40 (T) junctions
| Eastbound exits | Junction | Westbound exits |
|---|---|---|
| The Midlands Worcester (M50); Ross-on-Wye | Roundabout | Ross-on-Wye; The MIDLANDS Worcester (M50) |
| Hereford A49; Ross-on-Wye B4260 | Wilton Roundabout | Ross-on-Wye B4260; Hereford A49 |
| Goodrich | Goodrich Junction | Goodrich |
| Hereford A4137; Goodrich B4229 | Old Ross Road Junction | Hereford A4137; Goodrich B4229 |
| Whitchurch, Symond's Yat (West) | Whitchurch Junction | Whitchurch, Symond's Yat (West) |
| Exit only Whitchurch | Whitchurch South Junction | No exit or access |
| No exit or access | Oak House Junction | Crocker's Ash, Doward |
| Monmouth A466; Chepstow (A466), Forest of Dean (A4136) A40 | Old Dixon Roundabout | Monmouth A466 |
| Monmouth A466 | Wye Bridge Junction | Chepstow (A466), Forest of Dean (A4136) |
| Monmouth, Trelleck B4293 | Monnow Bridge Junction | Monmouth, Trelleck B4293 |
| No access or exit | Mitchel Troy Junction | Access only |
| Newport A449 | Raglan Interchange | Newport, Cardiff (M4) A449 |
| Abergavenny (A40), Raglan, Mitchel Troy | Raglan Junction | Raglan; Mitchel Troy, Dingestow |
| Clytha; Raglan; Gwehelog | Raglan Roundabout | Raglan; Gwehelog; Clytha |
| Hereford A465; Usk, Clytha B4598 | Ysbytty Fields Roundabout | No access or exit |
| Newport A4042; Merthyr Tydfil A465 | Ysbytty Fields Roundabout | Newport A4042; Merthyr Tydfil A465; Hereford A465 |

=== Abergavenny – Carmarthen ===
At Abergavenny is the A40 junction with the Heads of the Valleys road, (A465) and the A4042. Now the A465 becomes the primary route between the Midlands to the South Wales Valleys and Swansea; there is a dual-carriageway route to Carmarthen via the A465, M4 and A48.

The A40 becomes single carriageway and continues through Abergavenny, following the north side of the Usk valley through the eastern part of the Brecon Beacons National Park until Brecon. At Bwlch between Abergavenny and Brecon, the A40 is 660 feet (200 m) above sea level. The A40 is dualed for over 1.5 miles (2.4 km) as it approaches a junction east of Brecon with the A470 north, which is the main north–south road through mid-Wales. Continuing as a dual carriageway, the A40 and A470 concurrent bypass Brecon to the south, crossing the River Usk here. At the western end of the bypass is a further junction with the A470 south. Beyond this point the A40 continues as a single carriageway, now south of the River Usk, and roughly follows the northern edge of the Brecon Beacons National Park. A height of 820 feet (250 m) above sea level is located less than 1 mile (1.6 km) east of Trecastle. In Llandovery the road crosses the Heart of Wales railway and the River Tywi; the road, railway and river then run parallel until Llandeilo, where the National Park ends and the railway turns south. The A40 continues west along the Tywi valley to Carmarthen where as a dual carriageway it forms the eastern bypass, meeting the terminus of the A48 at Pensarn. Here the A40 returns to being a primary route westwards.

=== Carmarthen – Fishguard ===
At Carmarthen the A40 crosses the River Tywi twice with two 90-degree junctions and continues on 10 miles (16 km) of dual carriageway as far as St. Clears, where the dual carriageway ends at the junction with the A477 trunk road. Now the A40 is a mixture of 2 or 3 lane single-carriageway to Haverfordwest and Fishguard. This section of road is controlled by the Welsh Government (formerly 'Welsh Assembly Government'), which describes it as "one of the lowest standard sections of the Trans European Road Network in the United Kingdom".

==== St Clears to Haverfordwest dualling ====
There were plans in 2002 for a major improvement of the 23-mile stretch between St Clears and Haverfordwest which included upgrading to a dual carriageway; described as an extension of the national motorway network to the West Wales coast by virtue of the route from the M4 motorway being entirely dual carriageway. The £60 million scheme was subject to a European Environmental Assessment. Within a couple of years, the project appeared to be dying a very quiet death, causing local newspapers to report it being an election stunt for the two marginal constituencies that would best benefit from the improvements. The following Welsh elections saw both constituencies change the party of majority. The political party at the centre of the row instead directed the project deferment to damning environmental statements by Friends of the Earth Cymru. The scheme was officially scrapped in 2008 after a Welsh Assembly committee decided to abandon the proposals. Instead, it recommended upgrades to the existing route including bypasses around Robeston Wathen and Llanddewi Velfrey using a three-lane option. This was welcomed by the Friends of the Earth, saying "The dual carriageway on the A40 would increase traffic levels, increase the emission of greenhouse gases, it would be harmful for the environment, it would be hugely expensive. That money would be better spent on improving public transport, on health, on education, there's no need for it. We think the assembly committee has come to the right decision".

==== Whitland Bypass ====
The last improvement to the A40 on this section prior to the Welsh Assembly Government having the devolved responsibility for this road was a 4.1 kilometres (2.5 mi) £8 million bypass around Whitland. Constructed in 1994, the road started east of Black Bridge on the original A40, then running north of the town before to a new roundabout just west of Llain Cottage. The Secretary of State for Wales was asked a written question by Rhodri Morgan about adding a second carriageway to the Whitland bypass scheme, to which John Redwood replied "There are no proposals to add a second carriageway to the Whitland bypass. The design capacity of a single carriageway two-lane highway is more than adequate to cater with the anticipated traffic flows for the foreseeable future."

==== Llanddewi Velfrey Bypass ====
A new bypass has been granted approval by the Welsh Assembly Government at Llanddewi Velfrey in Pembrokeshire. The scheme would improve the A40 between Llanddewi Velfrey and Penblewin, to the west of St Clears and meet the aim of the targeted investment in infrastructure along the east–west road corridor in south Wales. From the east, it is proposed that a roundabout would be created just north of Glenfield Farm, where the straight section from St Clears ends at Bethel Chapel, and then take a new route north-west of the town of Llanddewi Velfrey, south-west over Pentroydin Fawr and Penttroydin Fech farms with cattle underpasses, a new underpass beneath the existing Llanddewi Velfrey to Llanfallteg road, before going over the original A40 at Ffynnon Wood. To the west of Ffynnon Wood, the road would then cross back over the original A40 to the east of Henllan Lodge in a way to maintain the tree lined avenue to Henllan, then run parallel to the A40 on the north side of the existing A40 to a new roundabout at Penblewin and the junction with the A478.

This was originally known as the Blue and Purple routes during the Consultation in 2006 for which 75% preferred the blue route, and only 20% preferred the red route. 54% felt the section from Ffynnon Wood and Penblewin Roundabout needed improvement, with both orange and purple routes preferred by 42% of the respondents. Welsh Water/Dwr Cymru expressed concerns with the red route affecting water mains and sewers, and Henllanfallteg Community Council felt the red route would not improve the quality of life in Llanddewi Velfrey. Pembrokeshire County Council expressed concerns that the route planned was a single carriageway, and that within seven years, a dual carriageway would be required.

==== Robeston Wathen Bypass ====
A new bypass has been constructed between Penblewin and Slebech Park making the road straighter and with a '2+1' road layout to help improve overtaking opportunities.

Starting to the west of Toch Lane (approx. 2 kilometres (1.2 mi) east of Slebech), the route travels eastwards for 4.6 kilometres (2.9 mi), passing 200 metres (660 ft) south of Robeston Wathen, and ending 0.5 kilometres (0.31 mi) east of the village, just west of Flimstone Lane.

Construction started on the route in February 2009, with the works completed and the new road opening 1 March 2011. The road was built by Costain. The scheme was nearly £14 million over the initial budget of £27.6 million, eventually costing £41.4 million. The Welsh Assembly Government explains this increase as being the result of inflation and land costs, saying the original budget did not include either, as well as additional statutory procedures, additional works following some design standards, and the increase in VAT.

==== The Kell ====
The Kell is located on a section of the A40 that forms a north–south corridor between Fishguard, 17 kilometres (11 mi) to the north and Haverfordwest, 7.5 kilometres (4.7 mi) to the south, close to Treffgarne and Spittal. The improvement saw about 0.48 kilometres (0.30 mi) of new trunk road commencing at a point on the trunk road approximately 622 metres south of the centreline of the junction of the A40 trunk road with the C3059 road to Spittal and extending in a generally northerly direction to a point approximately 112 metres south of the junction of the trunk road with the C3059 road to Spittal. This resulted in the road being rerouted through pasture to the east of the original road, taking a right hand bend about 160 metres (520 ft) south of The Old Mill, taking a 5.5% gradient, and rejoining the original road 210 metres (690 ft) north of The Kell. The original road has subsequently been converted to an access road for The Old Mill, Beavers Lodge and The Kell, accessing the new road at The Old Mill.

==== Fishguard Bypass ====
The Fishguard Bypass was planned to provide a more direct route with greater capacity to the Port of Fishguard at Goodwick avoiding the town centre of Fishguard. It was constructed during the late 1990s and opened in 2000. It takes the form of a three-lane carriageway on an approx. 10% gradient around the western edge of Fishguard. It runs from its highest point at Rafael roundabout 1 km south of Fishguard town in a generally northerly direction to its lowest point at Windy Hall roundabout where it rejoins the old A40 route at Gasworks Hill. The bypass is concurrent with a section of the A487 trunk road with the A40 dominant.

== Junction list ==
=== A40 ===
| County | Location | mi | km | Destinations | Notes |
|---|---|---|---|---|---|
| Greater London | City of London | 0.0 | 0.0 | Goswell Road (A1 north) / London Wall (A1121 east) – Angel, Islington | Eastern terminus; southern terminus of A1; western terminus of A1211 |
| Greater London | City of London-Camden boundary | 0.6 | 0.97 | New Fetter Lane (A4 west) / Hatton Garden (B521) / Charterhouse Street | Eastern terminus of A4 |
| Greater London | Camden | 1.2 | 1.9 | Theobalds Road (A401 east) | Eastern terminus of A401 concurrency |
| Greater London | Camden | 1.3 | 2.1 | Kingsway / Southampton Row (A4200) | No access from A40 east to A4200, from A4200 south to A40, or from A4200 north to A40 east |
| Greater London | Camden-Westminster boundary | 1.6– 1.7 | 2.6– 2.7 | A400 (Bloomsbury Street / Tottenham Court Road / Charging Cross Road) / Shaftesbury Avenue (A401 west) / A501 – Camden Town, West End, Westminster | West End and Westminster signed westbound only; western terminus of A401 concurrency |
| Greater London | Westminster | 2.2 | 3.5 | Regent Street (A4201) | No right-hand turns |
| Greater London | Westminster | 2.7 | 4.3 | Orchard Street (A41 west) / North Audley Street | Eastern terminus of A41 |
| Greater London | Westminster | 2.8 | 4.5 | Portman Street (A4380 north) / Park Street | Southern terminus of A4380 |
| Greater London | Westminster | 3.0 | 4.8 | Ring Road south (Park Lane / A4202 south) / A402 west (Bayswater Road) to A4 / A3 – Westminster, Notting Hill, Knightsbridge, Victoria | Knightsbridge and Victoria signed westbound only; eastern terminus of A5 / Ring Road concurrency; southern terminus of A5; eastern terminus of A402 |
| Greater London | Westminster | 3.1 | 5.0 | Wigmore Street (A5204 east) / Seymour Street | No access from A40 to A5204; western terminus of A5204 |
| Greater London | Westminster | 3.5 | 5.6 | Old Marylebone Road (A501 east) / Sussex Gardens (A4209 south-west) | No access from A40 to A501, from A40 east to A4209, from A501 to A40 west, or from A4209 to A40 east; north-eastern terminus of A4209 |
| Greater London | Westminster | 3.6 | 5.8 | A40 jumps from concurrency with A5 to the Westway without any direct connection | |
| Greater London | Westminster | 4.7 | 7.6 | To Ring Road south - West End, Paddington | Grade-separated junction; eastbound exit and westbound entrance |
| Greater London | Kensington and Chelsea-Hammersmith and Fulham borough boundary | 6.0– 6.3 | 9.7– 10.1 | A3220 south – Hammersmith, Shepherd's Bush, Earl's Court, Westminster | Grade-separated junction; Westminster signed eastbound only |
| Greater London | Hammersmith and Fulham | 6.5 | 10.5 | A219 – Harlesden, White City | Grade-separated junction; Eastbound exit and westbound entrance |
| Greater London | Ealing | 8.1– 8.3 | 13.0– 13.4 | A4000 / B4492 – Harlesden, Willesden, Acton, Park Royal | |
| Greater London | Ealing | 9.5 | 15.3 | Park Royal (central) | Grade-separated junction; eastbound exit only |
| Greater London | Ealing | 9.4– 10.0 | 15.1– 16.1 | A406 (North Circular) / M1 / M4 / A41 / A1 – Wembley, Ealing | |
| Greater London | Ealing | 10.9– 11.5 | 17.5– 18.5 | Perivale | Grade-separated junction |
| Greater London | Ealing | 11.9– 12.3 | 19.2– 19.8 | A4127 – Harrow, Sudbury, Greenford | Grade-separated junction |
| Greater London | Ealing | 13.3– 13.9 | 21.4– 22.4 | A312 – Heathrow Airport, Hayes, Southall, Yeading, Northolt | Grade-separated junction; Heathrow, Hayes, Southall and Yeading signed westbound only, Northolt eastbound only |
| Greater London | Hillingdon | 14.4– 14.9 | 23.2– 24.0 | A4180 – Ruislip, Heathrow Airport, Hayes, Southall, Yeading | Grade-separated junction; Ruislip signed westbound only, Heathrow, Hayes, Southall and Yeading eastbound only |
| Greater London | Hillingdon | 16.3– 17.2 | 26.2– 27.7 | A437 / B466 – Hillingdon, Ruislip, Ickenham | Grade-separated junction |
| Greater London | Hillingdon | 17.5– 17.9 | 28.2– 28.8 | B467 – Uxbridge, Harefield, Ickenham, Ruislip | Grade-separated junction; Ruislip signed eastbound only |
| Buckinghamshire | Denham | 18.5– 19.1 | 29.8– 30.7 | M40 north-west to M25 – Oxford, Birmingham, Beaconsfield, Watford A4020 east (Oxford Road) – Uxbridge, Denham A412 south (Denham Road) – Slough | Birmingham and Beaconsfield signed westbound only, Watford eastbound only; eastern terminus of A412 concurrency; western terminus of A4020 |
| Buckinghamshire | Denham | 19.7 | 31.7 | A412 north (Denham Avenue) – Rickmansworth, Higher Denham, Denham Green | Western terminus of A412 concurrency |
| Buckinghamshire | Denham | 20.6 | 33.2 | A413 north (Amersham Road) – Amersham, The Chalfonts | Southern terminus of A413 |
| Buckinghamshire | Beaconsfield | 25.5 | 41.0 | A355 to M40 / M25 – Heathrow Airport, Slough, Amersham, London, Wycombe | London and Wycombe signed westbound only |
| Buckinghamshire | Loudwater | 28.7 | 46.2 | M40 east – London, Flackwell Heath A4094 south – Maidenhead, Bourne End, Wooburn Green | Flackwell Heath signed westbound only; M4 junction 3; northern terminus of A4094 |
| Buckinghamshire | High Wycombe | 31.7 | 51.0 | A404 to M4 / M40 – Maidenhead, Marlow, Amersham | |
| Buckinghamshire | High Wycombe | 32.1 | 51.7 | A4128 north (Arch Way) – Great Missenden | Southern terminus of A4128 |
| Buckinghamshire | High Wycombe-West Wycombe boundary | 33.5 | 53.9 | A4010 south (Chapel Lane) to M40 / A404 – Marlow | Information signed eastbound only; eastern terminus of A4010 concurrency |
| Buckinghamshire | West Wycombe | 34.1 | 54.9 | A4010 north (Bradenham Road) – Aylesbury, Princes Risborough | Western terminus of A4010 concurrency |
| Oxfordshire | Great Haseley-Great Milton-Tiddington-with-Albury boundary | 47.6 | 76.6 | A329 (Rycote Lane) to M40 south – London, Wycombe, Wallingford, Thame, Stadhampton, Moreton | Brief concurrency |
| Oxfordshire | Great Milton-Tiddington-with-Albury boundary | 49.1 | 79.0 | A418 north-east (Oxford Road) – Aylesbury, Tiddington | Tiddington signed eastbound only; south-western terminus of A418 |
| Oxfordshire | Great Milton-Tiddington-with-Albury boundary | 49.7– 50.3 | 80.0– 81.0 | M40 – London, High Wycombe, Birmingham, Banbury | M40 junctions 8-8A |
| Oxfordshire | Wheatley | 51.9 | 83.5 | Wheatley, Holton, Waterperry | Grade-separated junction; no westbound exit |
| Oxfordshire | Headington | 54.6 | 87.9 | A4142 south (Ring Road) / A420 west (London Road) / Bayswater Road – City centre, Cowley, Headington, Barton | Northern terminus of A4142; eastern terminus of A420 |
| Oxfordshire | Marston | 56.3 | 90.6 | Marston, Elsfield | Grade-separated junction |
| Oxfordshire | Cutteslowe | 58.3 | 93.8 | A4165 (Banbury Road) – Summertown, Kidlington, Gosford | |
| Oxfordshire | Cutteslowe | 58.7 | 94.5 | A44 west (Ring Road) / Woodstock Road (A4144 south) / Five Mile Drive to A34 / M40 / A420 – Midlands, Evesham, Newbury, Oxford city centre, Wolvercote, Oxford Airport | Swindon signed eastbound only; eastern terminus of A44; northern terminus of A4144 |
| Oxfordshire | South Leigh-Witney boundary | 66.2 | 106.5 | B4022 – Witney East | Grade-separated junction; westbound exit and eastbound entrance |
| Oxfordshire | Witney-Ducklington boundary | 68.0– 68.4 | 109.4– 110.1 | A415 to A4095 – Witney, Abingdon, Faringdon | Grade-separated junction; To A4095 and Faringdon signed westbound only |
| Oxfordshire | Brize Norton-Minster Lovell boundary | 70.8 | 113.9 | B4477 – Carterton, RAF Brize Norton, Minster Lovell | Grade-separated junction; westbound exit and eastbound entrance |
| Oxfordshire | Burford | 74.8 | 120.4 | A361 (The Hill) to A424 – Lechlade, Chipping Norton, Stow, Burford, Faringdon | Faringdon signed eastbound only |
| Gloucestershire | Northleach with Eastington-Hampnett boundary | 83.9 | 135.0 | A429 – Cirencester, Stow, Northleach, Bibury, Turkdean, Bourton | |
| Gloucestershire | Shipton | 89.9 | 144.7 | A436 west / Shipton to A417 – Gloucester, Kilkenny | Eastern terminus of A436 concurrency |
| Gloucestershire | Andoversford | 90.7 | 146.0 | A436 east – Stow-on-the-Wold, Bourton-on-the-Water | Western terminus of A436 concurrency |
| Gloucestershire | Charlton Kings-Cheltenham boundary | 95.8 | 154.2 | A435 south (Cirencester Road) / Haywards Road – Cirencester, Seven Springs, Colesbourne | Information signed eastbound only; eastern terminus of A435 concurrency |
| Gloucestershire | Cheltenham | 96.1 | 154.7 | A435 north (London Road) to B4632 – Cheltenham town centre, Evesham, Broadway, Prestbury, Winchcombe | Information signed westbound only; western terminus of A435 concurrency |
| Gloucestershire | Cheltenham | 97.0 | 156.1 | A46 (Bath Road) – Stroud, Leckhampton, Shurdington, Birdlip | |
| Gloucestershire | Cheltenham | 98.8 | 159.0 | Princess Elizabeth Way (A4013 north) - Swindon Village | Southern terminus of A4013 |
| Gloucestershire | Badgeworth–Churchdown boundary | 100.1– 100.7 | 161.1– 162.1 | M5 – The South West, Midlands, Tewkesbury, Bristol | The South West and Midlands signed westbound only; Tewksbury and Bristol eastbound only; M5 junction 11 |
| Gloucestershire | Gloucester | | | A417 south-east / B4063 (Cheltenham Road) – Cirencester, Hucclecote, Longlevens, Churchdown, Innsworth | Airport signed eastbound only |
| Gloucestershire | Gloucester | 104.5 | 168.2 | A38 (Tewksbury Road) – Gloucester, Tewkesbury, Twigworth, Longford | |
| Gloucestershire | Gloucester | 105.8 | 170.3 | A417 to M50 – Ledbury, Gloucester, Hartpury, Maisemore | |
| Gloucestershire | Highnam | 107.3 | 172.7 | A48 west – Chepstow, Westbury-on-Severn, Minsterworth | Eastern terminus of A48 |
| Gloucestershire | Huntley | 112.3 | 180.7 | A4136 west (Longhope Road) to A466 – Monmouth, Chepstow, Cinderford, Mitcheldean | To A466, Monmouth, and Chepstow signed westbound only; eastern terminus of A4136 |
| Herefordshire | Ross-on-Wye | 121.4 | 195.4 | A449 north / Ledbury Road to M50 – Midlands, Worcester, Ross-on-Wye | Eastern terminus of A449 concurrency |
| Herefordshire | Wilton | 122.8 | 197.6 | A49 north / B4260 (Wilton Road) – Hereford, Ross-on-Wye, Wilton | Wilton signed eastbound only; southern terminus of A49 |
| Herefordshire | Whitchurch | 127.6– 127.7 | 205.4– 205.5 | A4137 to B4229 – Hereford, Goodrich, Symonds Yat (east) | Grade–separated junction; southern terminus of A4137 |
| Herefordshire–Monmouthshire county boundary | Ganarew–Monmouth boundary | 130.5 | 210.0 | England–Wales border | |
| Monmouthshire | Monmouth | 131.8– 132.4 | 212.1– 213.1 | A466 to A4136 – Monmouth, Chepstow, Forest of Dean | |
| Monmouthshire | Monmouth | 132.9 | 213.9 | B4293 to B4233 – Monmouth, Trellech, Rockfield | Grade-separated junction; To B4233 and Rockfield signed westbound only; no westbound entrance |
| Monmouthshire | Mitchel Troy–Raglan boundary | 138.8– 139.2 | 223.4– 224.0 | A449 south to M4 – Newport, Cardiff | Grade-separated junction; Cardiff signed westbound only; western terminus of A449 concurrency |
| Monmouthshire | Llanfoist Fawr–Abergavenny boundary | 147.6– 147.9 | 237.5– 238.0 | A465 (Heads of the Valleys Road) / A4042 south – Merthyr Tydfil, Hereford, Newport, Pontypool | Pontypool signed westbound only; northern terminus of A4042 |
| Monmouthshire | Abergavenny | 149.5 | 240.6 | A4143 south / MT Street to A465 – Llanfoist, Merthyr | Northern terminus of A4143 |
| Powys | Crickhowell | 155.2 | 249.8 | A4077 south (New Road) – Llangattock, Gilwern | Northern terminus of A4077 |
| Powys | Cwmdu | 156.7 | 252.2 | A479 north to A470 – Builth Wells, Tretower, Cwmdu, Talgarth | Southern terminus of A479 |
| Powys | Llanfrynach | 166.7 | 268.3 | Llanfrynach, Groesffordd, Llangors, Pencelli | Grade–separated junction |
| Powys | Brecon | 167.4 | 269.4 | A470 north / B4601 – Builth Wells, Brecon | Eastern terminus of A470 concurrency |
| Powys | Brecon | 169.8 | 273.3 | A470 south / B4601 – Cardiff, Llanfaes | Western terminus of A470 concurrency |
| Powys | Sennybridge | 177.2 | 285.2 | A4067 south – Ystradgynlais, Swansea | Northern terminus of A4067 |
| Carmarthenshire | Llandovery | 189.7 | 305.3 | A4069 south (Broad Street) – Llangadog | Northern terminus of A4069 |
| Carmarthenshire | Llandovery | 189.9 | 305.6 | A483 north (New Road) – Builth Wells | Eastern terminus of A483 concurrency |
| Carmarthenshire | Llanwrda | 193.9 | 312.1 | A482 north-west – Lampeter, Pumsaint | South-eastern terminus of A482 |
| Carmarthenshire | Llansadwrn | 196.3 | 315.9 | A4069 (Station Road) – Llangadog, Brynamman, Bethlehem | |
| Carmarthenshire | Manordeilo and Salem | 201.5 | 324.3 | A483 south (Rhosmaen Street) to M4 – Llandeilo, Swansea | Western terminus of A483 concurrency |
| Carmarthenshire | Carmarthen | 214.8 | 345.7 | A485 north to A484 – Lampeter, Cardigan | Southern terminus of A485 |
| Carmarthenshire | Llangunnor | 216.2 | 347.9 | A484 north / B4300 (Heol Llangynnwr) – Carmarthen town centre, Llangunnor | Eastern terminus of A484 concurrency |
| Carmarthenshire | Llangunnor | 216.7 | 348.7 | A48 east / A484 south to M4 – Swansea, Llanelli, Burry Port, Kidwelly | Western terminus of A484 concurrency; western terminus of A48 |
| Carmarthenshire | Carmarthen | 217.2 | 349.5 | A4242 east – Town centre | Western terminus of A4242 |
| Carmarthenshire | Carmarthen | 217.6– 217.8 | 350.2– 350.5 | B4312 – Johnstown | Grade-separated junction; no eastbound exit |
| Carmarthenshire | Carmarthen | 218.4– 218.5 | 351.5– 351.6 | Llanllwch to B4312 – Johnstown | Grade-separated junction; To B4312 and Johnstown signed eastbound only |
| Carmarthenshire | St Clears | 225.5– 225.9 | 362.9– 363.6 | A477 west / A4066 south to A478 – Pembroke Dock, St Clears, Laugharne, Pendine, Tenby | To A478 and Tenby signed westbound only; eastern terminus of A477; northern terminus of A4066 |
| Pembrokeshire | Llanddewi Velfrey–Narberth boundary | 235.9 | 379.6 | A478 – Cardigan, Narberth | |
| Pembrokeshire | Llawhaden | 239.3 | 385.1 | A4075 south / B4314 to A477 – Pembroke Dock, Tenby, Robeston Wathen, Llawhaden | Northern terminus of A4075 |
| Pembrokeshire | Haverfordwest | 246.2– 247.4 | 396.2– 398.2 | A487 north / A4076 south – Town centre, Milford Haven, St Davids | St Davids signed westbound only; southern terminus of A487; northern terminus of A4076 |
| Pembrokeshire | Scleddau | 258.8 | 416.5 | A4219 north to A487 – St Davids | Southern terminus of A4219 |
| Pembrokeshire | Fishguard and Goodwick | 260.0– 261.2 | 418.4– 420.4 | A487 – Fishguard, Cardigan, St Davids | Western terminus |
| Pembrokeshire | 1.000 mi = 1.609 km; 1.000 km = 0.621 mi: Incomplete access | | | | |

== Gallery ==
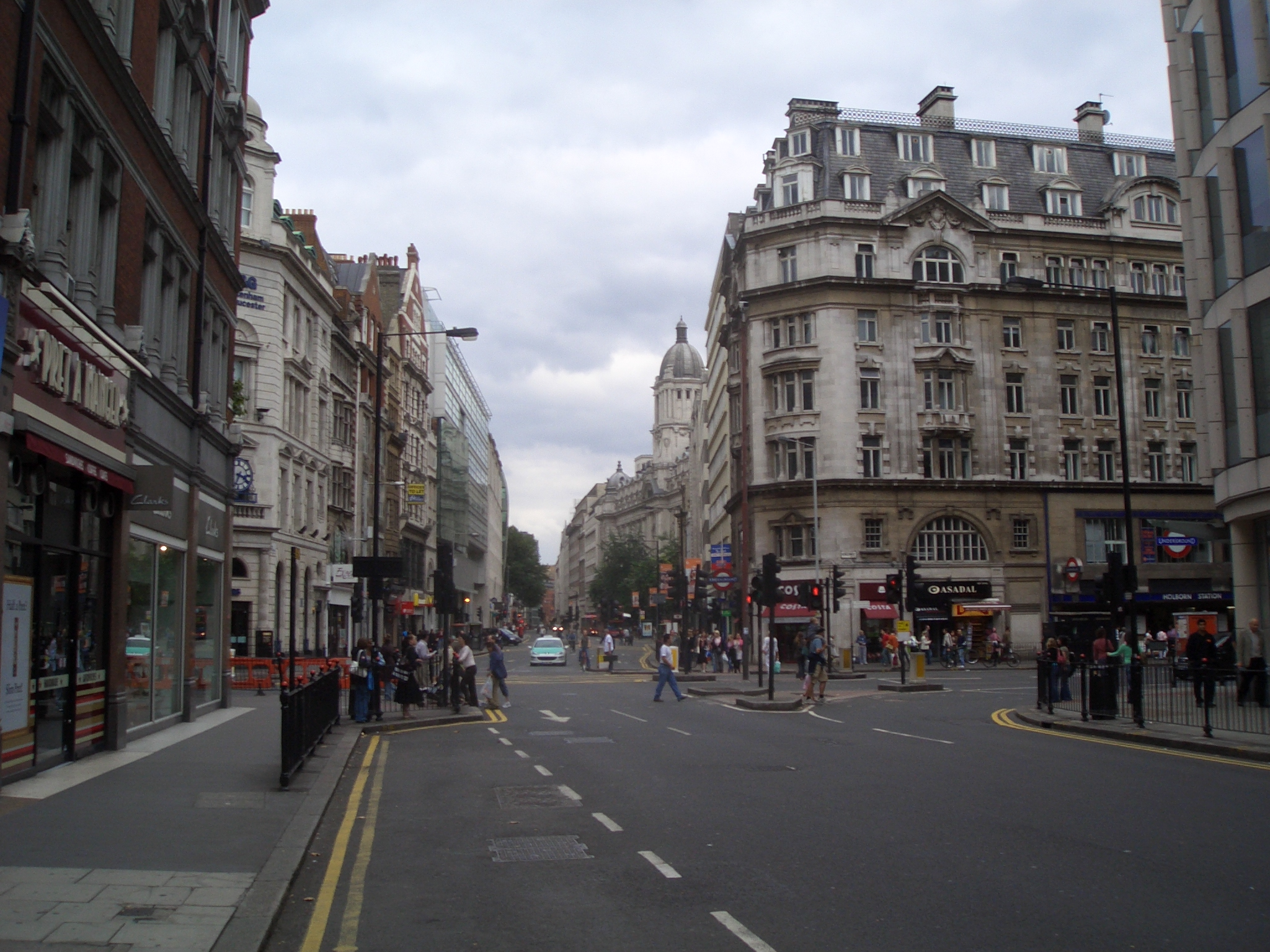
High Holborn

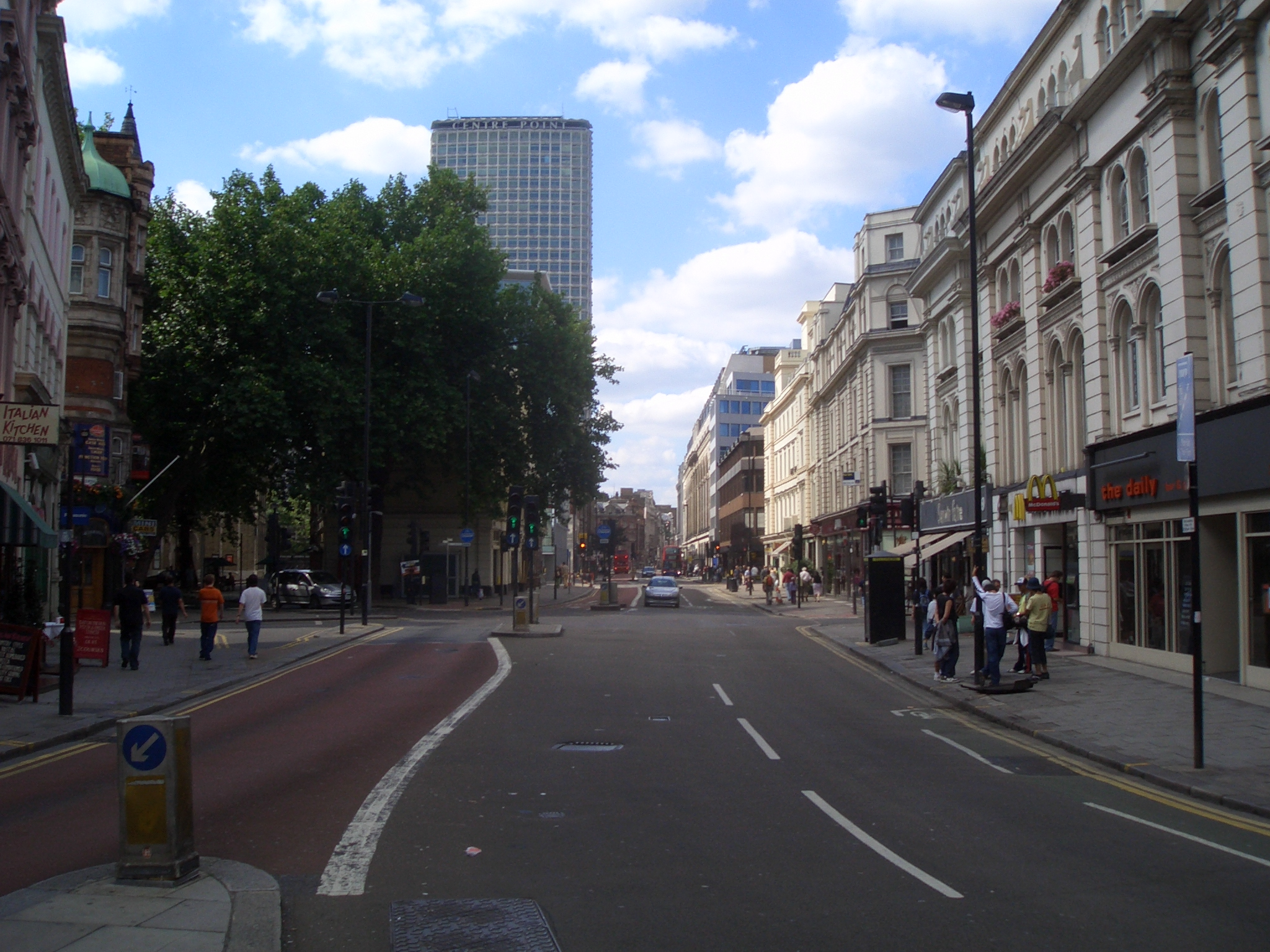
New Oxford Street

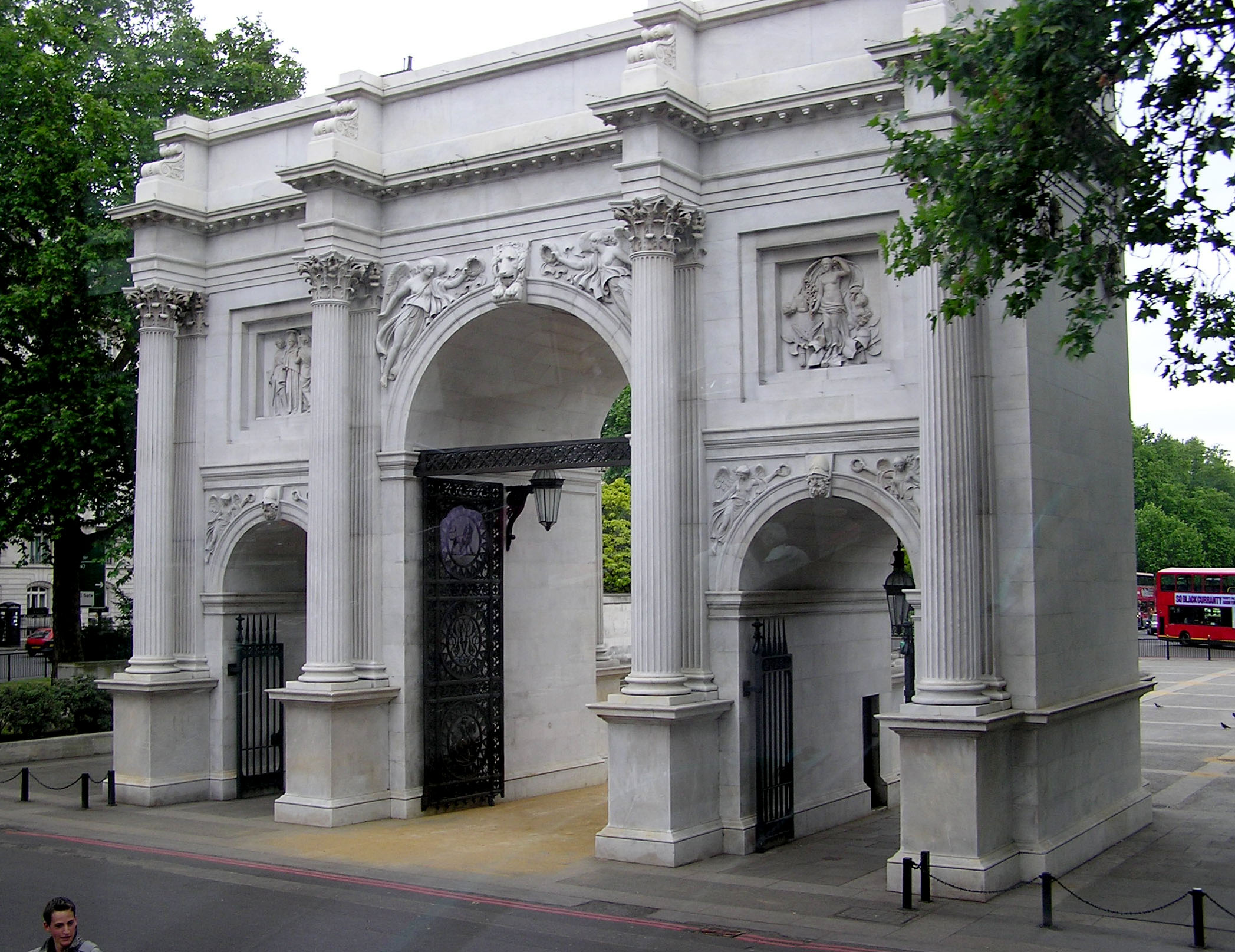
Marble Arch

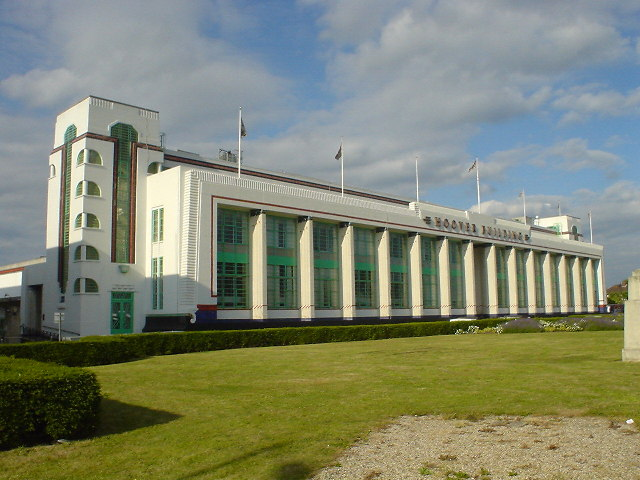
The Hoover Building as seen from the A40 Western Avenue in Perivale

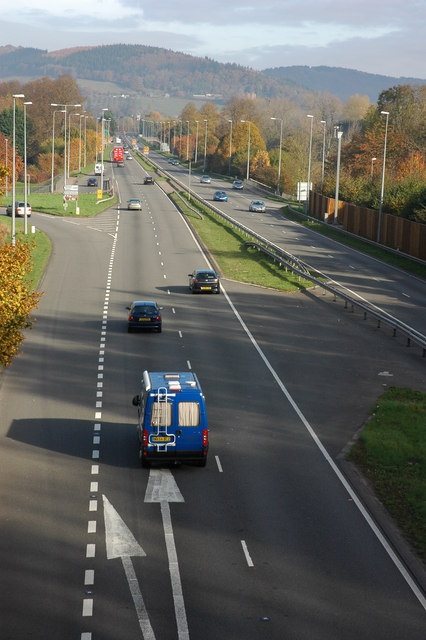
A40 at Monmouth

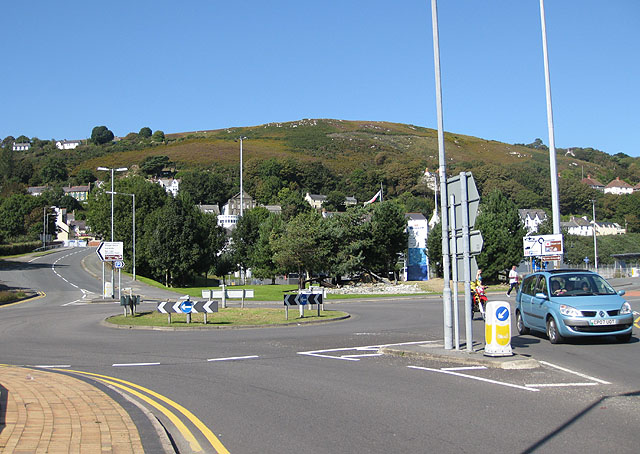
Western end of A40 at Goodwick

== See also ==
- British road numbering scheme
- Trunk roads in Wales
