= Velfrey =

Velfrey may refer to the following places in Wales:

- Lampeter Velfrey
- Llanddewi Velfrey
