= A4060 road =

Road in Wales

Coordinates: 51.74935°N 3.35838°W

A4060

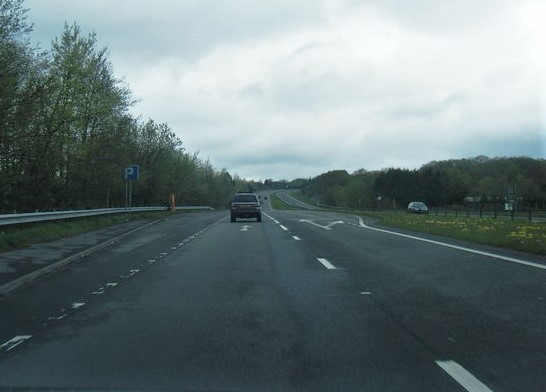
- The A4060 dual carriageway near Cwmblacks Farm, Merthyr Tydfil.

Route information
- Maintained by South Wales Trunk Road Agency
- Length: 3.8 mi (6.1 km)

Major junctions
- South end: Merthyr Tydfil
- A470 A4054 A4102 A465
- North end: Merthyr Tydfil

Location
- Country: United Kingdom
- Primary destinations: Merthyr Tydfil

Road network
- Roads in the United Kingdom; Motorways; A and B road zones
← A4059	→ A4061

The A4060, also known as the East of Abercynon to East of Dowlais Trunk Road, is a trunk road in Wales.

== Route ==
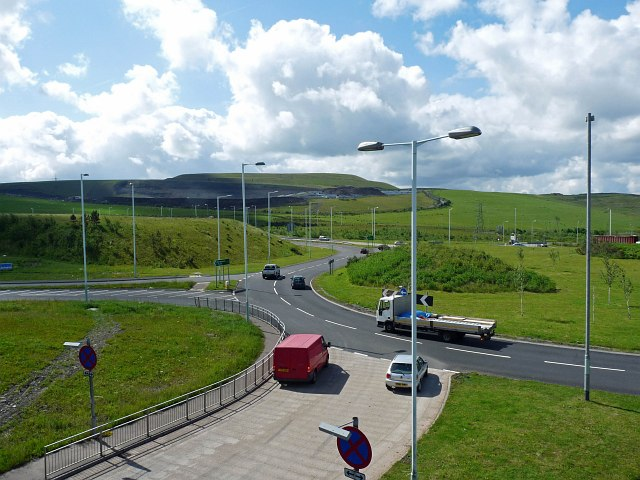
Dowlais Top, is the start/end of the A4060

The road starts at A470 The Pentrebach Roundabout South of Merthyr Tydfil. This first stretch is a 3 lane single carriageway road that was the old A470. It then comes to a roundabout by the Hoover Plant and The Premier Inn where there are links to Aberfan and Troedyrhiw via the A4054, Merthyr Town Centre via the A4054 (the old A470). The A4060 then leads to another roundabout a few yards up with turn offs to The Triangle Business Park and the Co Op Supermarket. After this roundabout the road becomes a dual carriageway with quite a steep Hill Climb. After about 3 miles there is another roundabout which has links to Mountain Hare and Dowlais Ind Est and the A4102. The other link is a Mountain Road to Cwm Bargoed and Fochriw.

After the Roundabout the dual carriageway continues to Dowlais Top where there are links to Dowlais via the A4102, Neath (Brecon A470) via the A465, Abergavenny via the A465 and Fochriw and ASDA Supermarket

== History ==
Before the new A470 dual carriageway was built between Cefn Coed Y Cymmer and Pentrebach the A4060 was a main alternative route for people coming from the North (Brecon A470) and the West (Neath) via the A465 to avoid traffic hold ups in Merthyr Tydfil town centre.

== See also ==
- Trunk roads in Wales
