= A489 road =

Road in England and Wales

Coordinates: 52.50776°N 3.27513°W

A489

Route information
- Maintained by North & Mid Wales Trunk Road Agency

Major junctions
- East end: Craven Arms
- A49 A488; A490 A483 A470 A487
- West end: Machynlleth

Location
- Country: United Kingdom
- Constituent country: Wales
- Primary destinations: Newtown

Road network
- Roads in the United Kingdom; Motorways; A and B road zones

The A489, officially known as the Newtown to Machynlleth Trunk Road in Wales, is a trunk road in the United Kingdom running from Craven Arms, Shropshire to Machynlleth, Powys and crossing the Wales-England border.

The road starts about one mile north of Craven Arms. From here it travels through Lydham, Churchstoke, Newtown, Caersws, Cemmaes Road and Machynlleth.

Between Caersws and Cemmaes Road, the road is concurrent with the A470, which takes priority. Similarly in Lydham, albeit for a much shorter distance, the road overlaps with the A488.

A new section of road, the Newtown Bypass, was completed in 2019.

== See also ==
- Trunk roads in Wales
