= Cathedral Road, Cardiff =

Road in Cardiff, Wales

Coordinates: 51.48543°N 3.19417°W

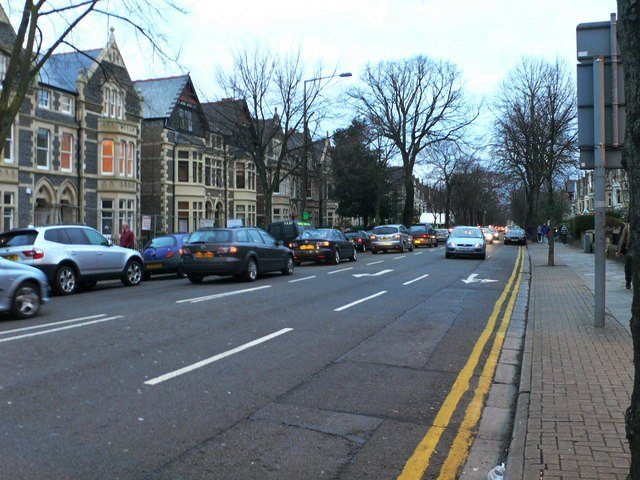
Cathedral Road looking south

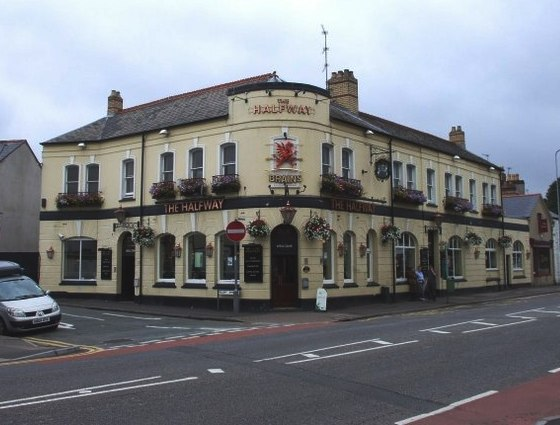
The Halfway public house in Cathedral Road

Cathedral Road (Welsh: Heol y Gadeirlan) is one of the major roads of western Cardiff, Wales, passing through the suburb of Pontcanna. It forms part of the A4119 road from Cardiff Bay to Tonypandy and houses which are not lived in have been converted to professional businesses specialising in dentistry, psychotherapy, medicine and solicitors. It connects the centre of the Welsh capital to the north-west of the city.

Cathedral Road was previously known as Pontcanna Lane, running between Plasturton Farm in the south and Pontcanna Farm to the north. Between 1885 and 1900 many large villas were constructed, occupied by the very wealthiest families of Cardiff.
