= A473 road =

Road in Wales

A473

Major junctions
- Northeast end: Upper Boat
- A470 A4054 A4119 A4222; M4 Junction 35; A48 A4061 A4063
- Southwest end: Laleston

Location
- Country: United Kingdom
- Constituent country: Wales
- Primary destinations: Bridgend

Road network
- Roads in the United Kingdom; Motorways; A and B road zones

The A473 is a main road linking Pontypridd with Bridgend in Wales.

The route begins in Upper Boat just south of Pontypridd, at the junction with the A470 and A4054 roads. It crosses the bridge in an easterly direction and continues along the road until it reaches the hill known locally as Power Station hill until it reaches a roundabout near the village of Tonteg after which it heads in a south westerly direction. The road continues along the stretch of road bypassing the villages of Church Village, Llantwit Fardre, Beddau and Llantrisant. After Llantrisant, the road heads in a westerly direction through Llanharan and then turns to a south westerly direction through Pencoed. The road enters Bridgend from the south and passes through the town centre before terminating at the junction with the A48 at Laleston to the west of Bridgend.

== Talbot Green Bypass ==
The Talbot Green by-pass was opened in 1991 to relieve traffic in the village through disabling access to or from Pontyclun via Cowbridge Road, and provided a shorter route for the A473 Bridgend to Pontypridd Road.

== Church Village Bypass ==
Preparatory work on the bypass began in February 2008, and the bypass opened on 7 September 2010. It is a single carriageway, with crawler and overtaking lanes around roundabouts. As the result of this completion the existing A473 from Gwaun Meisgyn to Treforest route was downgraded to the B4595 meaning that "Power Station hill" became part of the A473 Pontypridd to Bridgend route which also meant that the A473 now starts at the A470 junction at Upper Boat rather than Treforest. It also meant that the A4058 in Treforest and Glyn Taff became part of the B4595 Treforest to Talbot Green route meaning that the A4058 will start from the junction at the A470 in Pontypridd and follows its usual route to Treorchy.

== Sources ==
- Google Maps UK
