= A469 road =

Road in south Wales

Coordinates: 51.63469°N 3.23135°W

A469

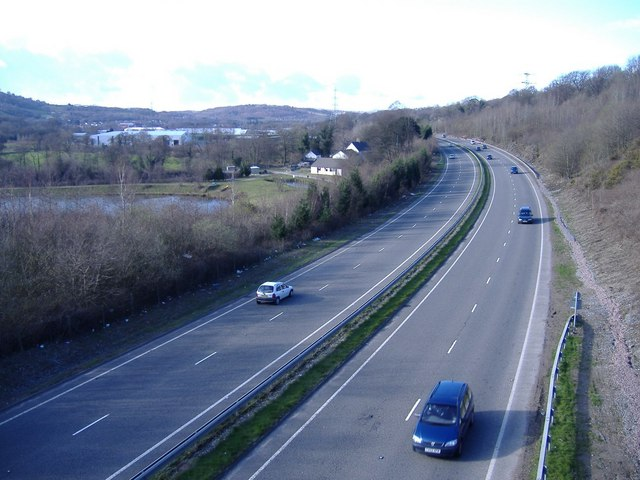
- The A469 from Caerphilly to Rhymney

Major junctions
- North end: A4161
- A4161 A470; A48 A468 A472 A4049 A465
- South end: A465

Location
- Country: United Kingdom
- Constituent country: Wales
- Primary destinations: Cardiff

Road network
- Roads in the United Kingdom; Motorways; A and B road zones
← A468	→ A470

The A469 is a road in south Wales. It links Cardiff and Caerphilly with Rhymney and the Heads of the Valleys Road (A465).

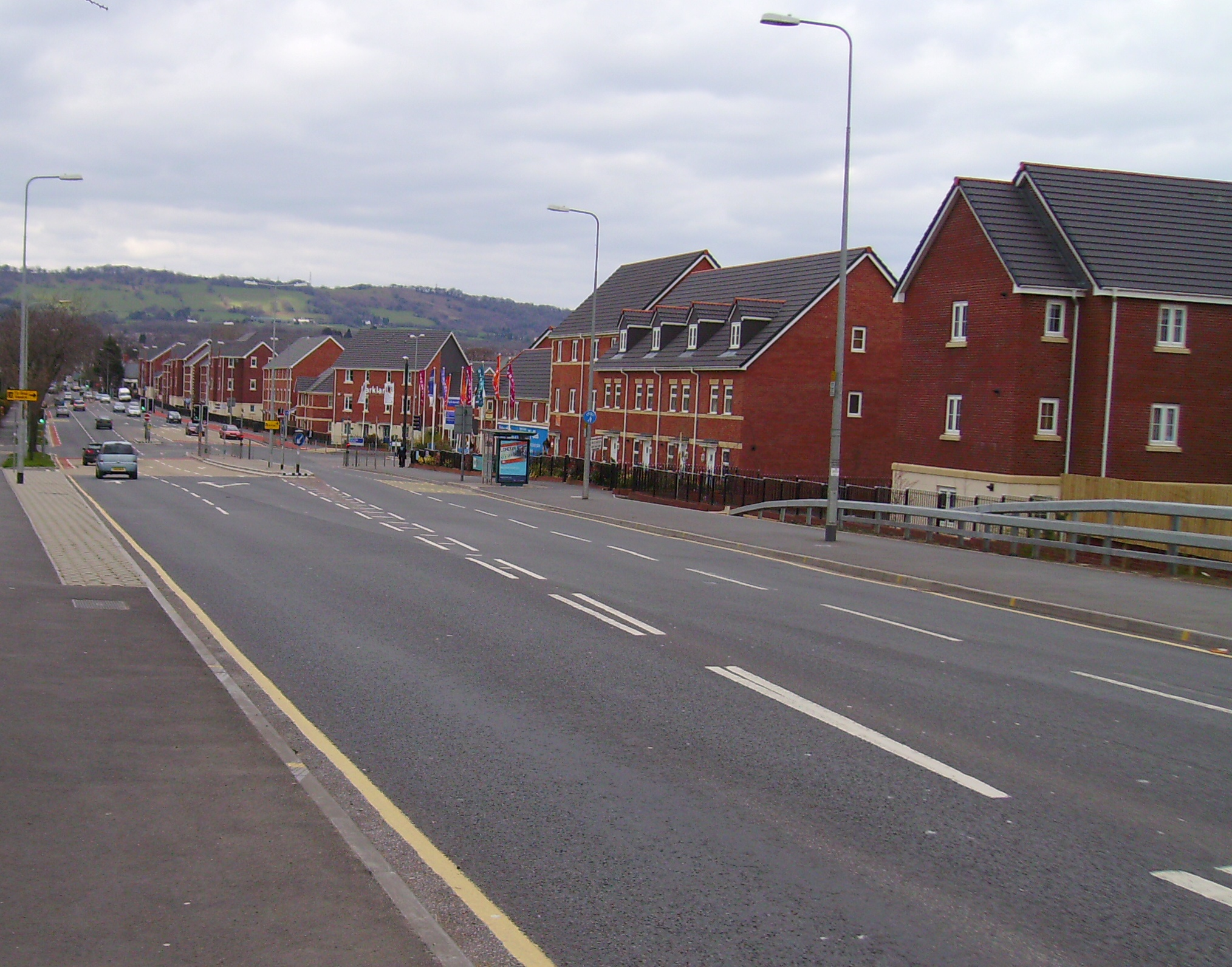
Caerphilly Road, Cardiff, heading north to Caerphilly

== See also ==
- Transport in Cardiff
- Transport in Wales
