= A465 road =

Major road in England and south Wales

A465

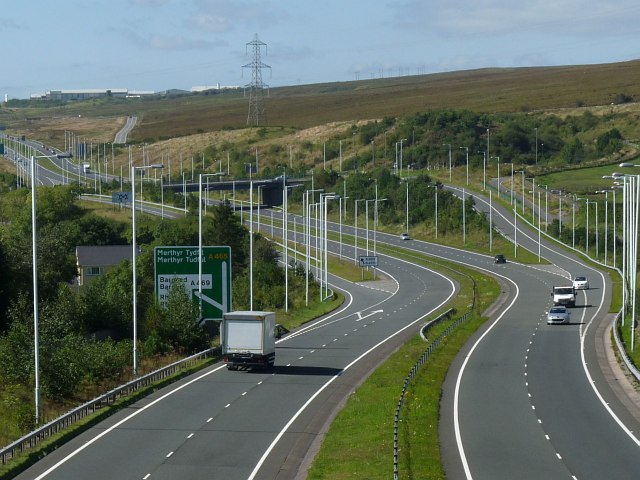

Route information
- Maintained by English local authorities and South Wales Trunk Road Agency
- Length: 66 mi (106 km)

Major junctions
- West end: Llandarcy; 51.6492°N 3.8486°W
- M4 Junction 43; A48 A474 A4230 A4109 A4061 A4059 A470 A4054 A4060 A469 A4048 A4046 A4047 A467 A4077 A4143 A4042; A40; A49
- East end: Bromyard, Herefordshire; 52.1870°N 2.5139°W

Location
- Country: United Kingdom
- Primary destinations: Neath; Merthyr Tydfil; Abergavenny; Hereford

Road network
- Roads in the United Kingdom; Motorways; A and B road zones

The A465 is a trunk road that runs from Bromyard in Herefordshire, England to Llandarcy near Swansea in south Wales. The section from Abergavenny to the Vale of Neath is commonly referred to as the Heads of the Valleys Road because it links the heads of the South Wales Valleys. The western half in Wales is officially known as the Neath to Abergavenny Trunk Road. The Heads of the Valleys Road from Abergavenny to Merthyr Tydfil was built in 1812. A 23-year long major upgrade programme converted the road into a dual carriageway in each direction and was finally completed on 31 May 2025.

Approximately following the southern boundary of the Brecon Beacons National Park, the Ordnance Survey Pathfinder guide describes it as the unofficial border between rural and industrial South Wales. The A465 provides an alternative route between England and the counties in South West Wales and to the ferries to Ireland.

== Route ==
The A465 runs south-west from Bromyard towards the River Lugg, from where it runs concurrently with the A4103 for a short distance before entering Hereford. After a short distance on the A49, it crosses the River Wye, the River Monnow and the border into Wales. The A465 meets the A40 trunk road in Abergavenny and continues west through the 'Heads of the Valleys' region past Brynmawr, Ebbw Vale, Tredegar, Rhymney, Merthyr Tydfil, Hirwaun, Glynneath and Aberdulais.

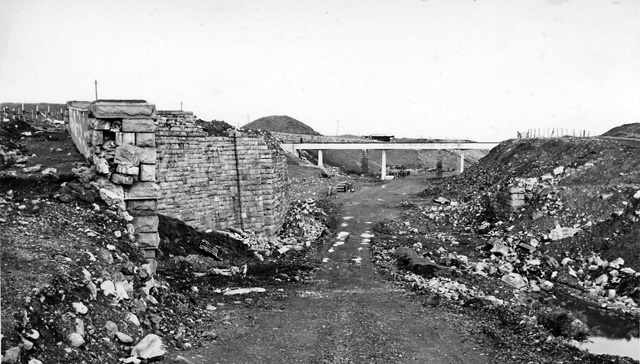
The A465 runs over the former Merthyr, Tredegar and Abergavenny Railway line (1965)

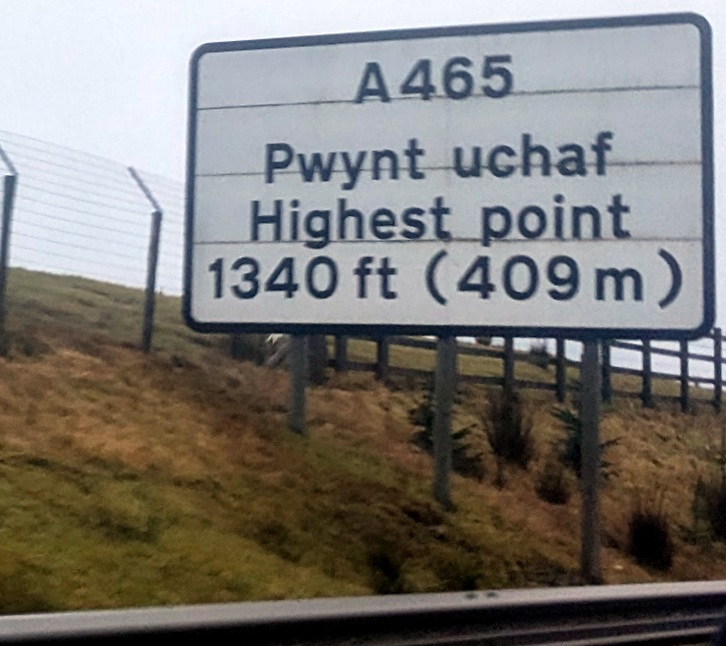
Highest point of the A465 road

Even before the construction of the Heads of the Valleys road began in the 1960s, there were concerns and complaints regarding the capacity and safety of a single carriageway, three-lane design. The Abergavenny–Neath trunk road opened in 1964.

Until 1996, the A465 ran for most of its length between Glynneath and Aberdulais along a narrow single carriageway road, now redesignated as the B4242. The high collision rate on this stretch was the main factor in leading to the construction of the dual carriageway between these points. The section of the A465 from Hirwaun to Llandarcy is all dual carriageway.

The highest point (signposted) of 1,350 feet (410 m) is on the Ebbw Vale section which is now dual carriageway and slip roads between Dowlais Top and Tredegar via Rhymney. At Dowlais Top there are link roads such as the A4060, which runs down to the south end of Merthyr Tydfil and links with the A470, and the A4054 which goes through Merthyr Vale and Aberfan. Another link is the A4102 which leads into Dowlais and Merthyr Tydfil town centre. The A465 passes Prince Charles Hospital in Merthyr Tydfil and then continues to Cefn-coed-y-cymmer and the A470 link. It then continues down the floor of the Vale of Neath, bypassing Resolven, Neath and Skewen, before terminating at junction 43, Llandarcy Interchange, of the M4 at Llandarcy.

== Major upgrade ==
In 1990, a regional traffic study identified the need for improvements to the A465. In 1994, alternatives were presented for public consultation for the improvement of the 25-mile length between Abergavenny and Hirwaun, connecting the existing A465 dual carriageway link from Swansea to the A40, which is an important part of the route to the M50. In July 1995 the then Secretary of State for Wales announced the preferred route. This mainly consisted of widening the existing road to provide a dual carriageway standard with grade-separated junctions (and extra climbing lanes on certain hills) between Abergavenny and Hirwaun. The design was developed and a draft line order was published in 1997. This was tested at public local inquiry in 1998 after which the Secretary of State for Wales announced the decision to proceed with the scheme in 1999.

Much of the land on the route is undulating, but despite this, the preferred route alignment is considered to be of high standard and as such allows most of the route to have the national speed limit.

Map of the A465 upgrade sections

Initially, the upgrade was split into seven sections. Later, sections 6 and 7 were combined into a single scheme for the purposes of construction. Construction of sections 5 and 6 has also been treated as a single scheme.

A465 upgrade sections are
Section	From / To	Commencement date	Completion date	Status	Final Cost	Image
1	Abergavenny to Gilwern	February 2005	May 2008	Complete	£57m	
2	Gilwern to Brynmawr	December 2014	December 2021	Complete	£336.2m	
3	Brynmawr to Tredegar	January 2013	September 2015	Complete	£163.3m	
4	Tredegar to Dowlais Top	March 2002	November 2004	Complete	£57.8m	
5 & 6	Dowlais Top to Hirwaun	May 2021	May 2025	Complete	£590m	

=== Sections 1 to 4 ===
The A465 between Llandarcy and Hirwaun was initially constructed to dual carriageway standard, and as such will not see a major upgrade. Construction work began on section 4 (Tredegar to Dowlais Top) in early spring 2002, and was completed by November 2004.

Construction of Section 1 (Abergavenny to Gilwern) began in February 2005. This was primarily an on-line upgrade of the existing single-carriageway road, and was completed on 22 May 2008.

The contract for Section 3 (Brynmawr to Tredegar) was awarded to Carillion in March 2010. In August 2012, it was announced that approval for the scheme to commence had been given and that construction would commence by the end of 2012. This section received £82M support from the European Regional Development Fund.

Planning for Section 2 (Gilwern to Brynmawr) started in June 2011, with construction beginning in January 2015. The project was due to be finished in 2018. However, this section saw several delays and cost overruns, and was completed in December 2021.

=== Sections 5 and 6 ===
On 10 November 2020, the Welsh Government announced that the contract for Section 5 & 6 (Dowlais Top to Hirwaun) had been awarded to Future Valleys Construction, a consortium which 'comprises large international construction companies alongside established financial investors'. Site clearance works began shortly thereafter, and major construction work commenced in May 2021. Completion of the scheme was programmed for mid-2025 and was completed 31 May 2025.

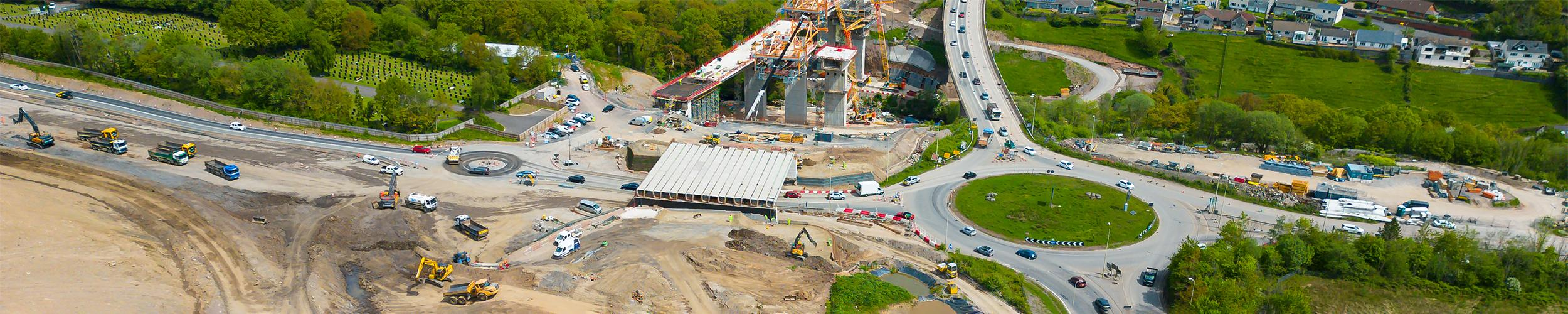
Sections 5 & 6 (Dowlais Top to Hirwaun). The junction of the A470 and A465 during construction in 2023

== See also ==
- Trunk roads in Wales
