= A4119 road =

Road in South Wales

A4119

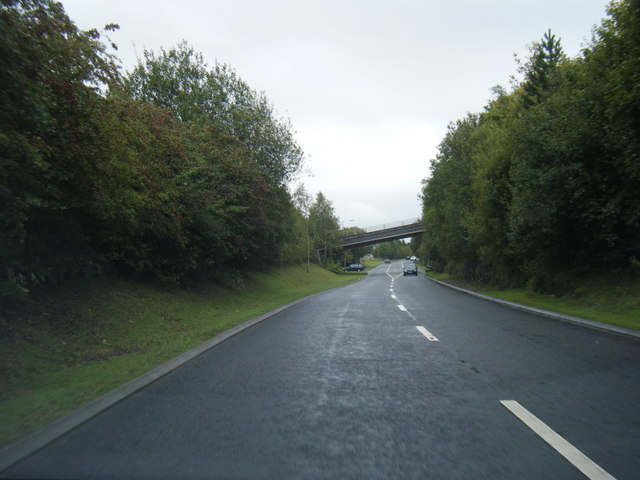
- A4119 near Gilfach Road bridge

Route information
- Length: 19.5 mi (31.4 km)
- History: Construction completed 1995

Major junctions
- Northwest end: Colliers Way, Tonypandy; 51.6240°N 3.4537°W
- A4058 A4233 A4093 A473; M4 Jnc. 34 A4054; A48 A470
- Southeast end: Bute Place, Cardiff Bay; 51.4649°N 3.1646°W

Location
- Country: United Kingdom
- Constituent country: Wales
- Primary destinations: Cardiff

Road network
- Roads in the United Kingdom; Motorways; A and B road zones

The A4119 links Tonypandy with Cardiff in South Wales.

== Route ==
=== City and County of Cardiff ===
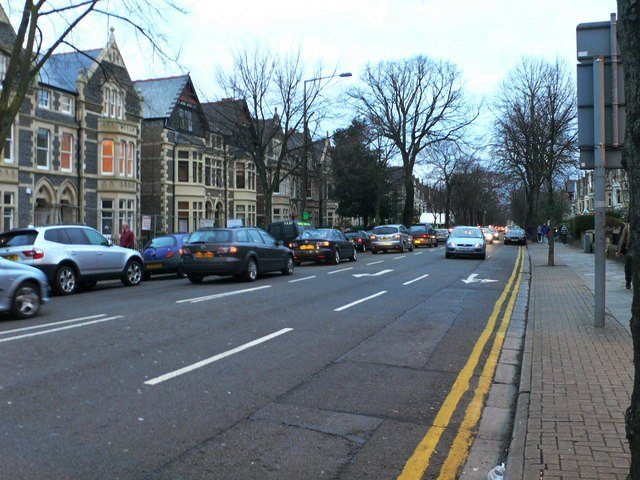
Cathedral Road in Cardiff

The A4119 starts outside the Wales Millennium Centre at Cardiff Bay and proceeds through Butetown, Grangetown, Riverside and Cathedral Road in Canton until meeting the A48 road (Western Avenue) at Llandaff. From here it proceeds through Llandaff passing the former BBC Wales studios. After leaving Llandaff the road takes on a more rural setting with many bends crossing the M4 Motorway near Capel Llanitern. From here the road snakes past the settlement of Creigiau.

=== Rhondda Cynon Taf ===
The road enters the County Borough of Rhondda Cynon Taf (formerly Mid-Glamorgan) at Groes-faen. The road continues through the Village until it comes to a T-Junction at The Castell Mynach Public House. To the left is a Spur of the A4119 that links to Junction 34 of the M4 Motorway. Off the roundabout at the Junction is the Renishaw Plant (formally owned by Bosch.)

The road continues after the t-junction past Miskin and Mwyndy.

==== Development of Infrastructure in Talbot Green ====
The A4119 through Talbot Green was first built circa 1977 as a single carriageway passing to the side of the village straight on to Ely Valley Road, easing pressure off the original small lanes that lead from Talbot Green to the area known as Mwyndy, south of the village. The road here was built at the same time as an extension of the original Talbot – Cardiff road, leading to Junction 34 of the M4 Motorway, and creating better access to the lanes leading to the Vale of Glamorgan. At Mwyndy Cross, you can still see the original lane that the road used, signposted "Arthur Llewelyn Jenkins", the lane is accessible to the furniture store and as far as Cefn-y-Parc cemetery but is blocked at the bypass. There is a roundabout with the Talbot Green Bypass after passing Mwyndy Cross and the original roads – the A473 Pontypridd to Bridgend Road. This roundabout was added when the bypass was built in 1991 and was improved during mid 2016 to mid 2017 to add extra dedicated lanes and a traffic lighting system. Another roundabout was located at the base of Llantrisant, where the A473 originally ran. When the bypass was built, it cut off the original main road from Cowbridge via Pontyclun and therefore traffic is forced to use the new Bypass.

The decision was made by Mid-Glamorgan County Council in the early 1990s to dual the section of A4119 between Ynysmaerdy and Mwyndy. This would be the last major road project undertaken by Mid-Glamorgan before its abolishment in 1996.

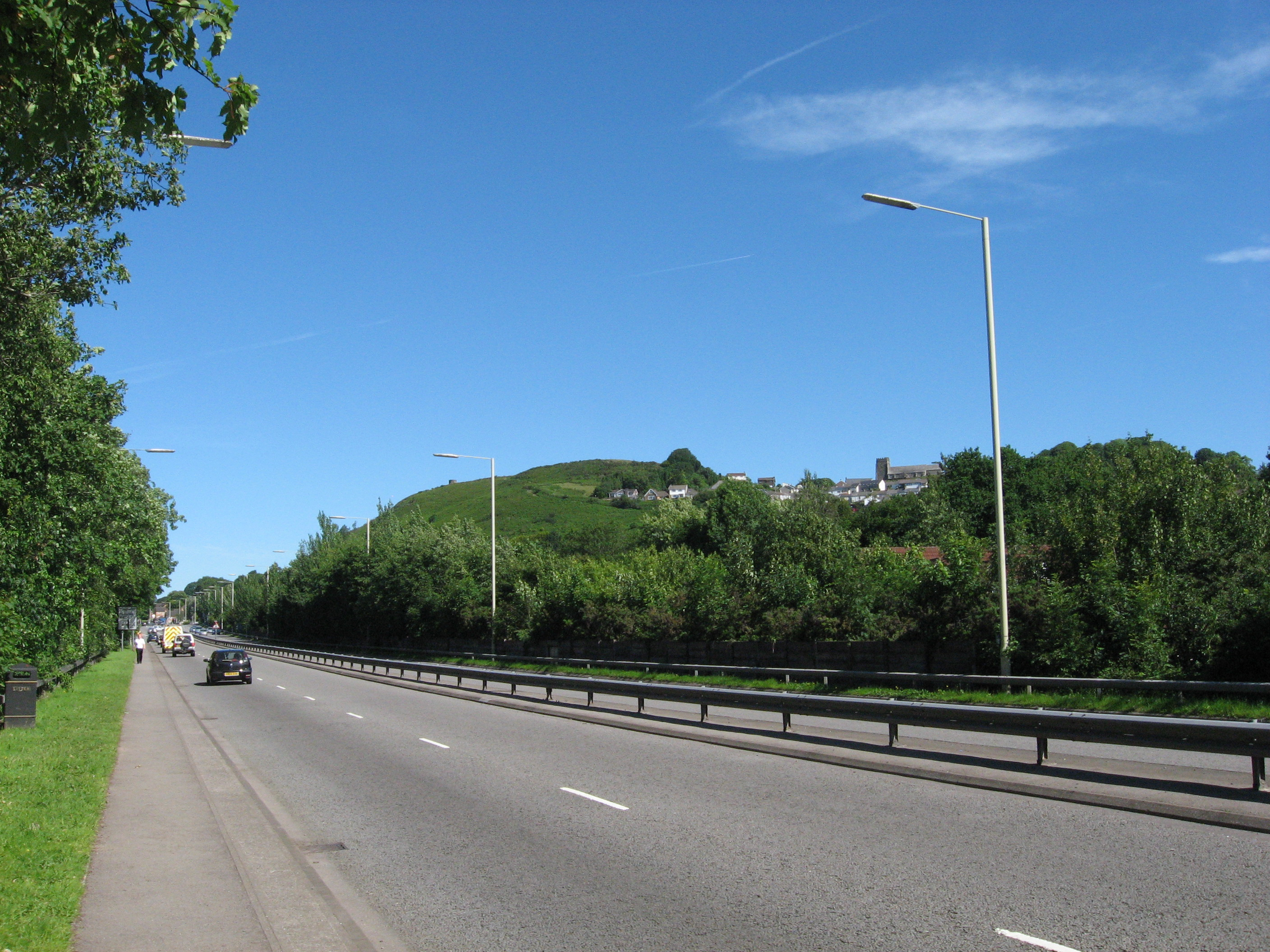
The Talbot Green to Ynysmaerdy dual carriageway

The completed "Talbot Green to Ynysmaerdy Dual Carriageway" officially opened on 28 July 1995. The scheme replaced the old Roundabout near Llantrisant with a four way traffic-lit junction, and completely replaced the original Ely Valley Road at Talbot Green apart from the first portion: a t-junction from the centre Talbot Green's high street that leads to a row of houses and a Golf Club, this is the only remaining section Ely Valley Road that is un-altered, still bearing the original road surface and signage, although it is now a Cul-de-sac.

At the next roundabout the road takes the shape of a bow passed the Ely Meadows which is now the site of Magden Park, a development of Offices, Hotel, Pub and private Health facility. Bypassing the Royal Glamorgan Hospital, Avionics department of British Airways and the Headquarters of the Welsh Blood Service.

On the south-bound carriageway is a long stretch of original road, although now a parking area where refreshment vans and sleepy truckers are a common sight, it provides access to some houses and a rural lane leading to Llantrisant.

The Road then comes to a roundabout with a turn-off for the Llantrisant Industrial Park, which is home to the Royal Mint.

Another smaller roundabout at the village of Ynysmaerdy, where the new Headquarters of the South Wales Fire and Rescue Service is located.

=== Ely and Rhondda Valleys ===
Past Ynysmaerdy the dual carriage way climbs a hill, which is known locally as "Stink Pot Hill" because of the sewerage works that are on the side of the road.. This was originally a single carriageway road but in August 2022, construction started to upgrade it to dual carriageway and in March 2025, it was completed.

At the next roundabout the road splits, this is where a bypass separates from the original course of the A4119 and from this point on the road is once again single carriageway. The old road through the village of Coed-Ely is to the right. The bypass, completed in 1987, takes the route of the old Ely Valley Railway, and the former site of the Coed-Ely Colliery is on the left. From here the road is still single carriageway with numerous rest areas. The road continues on another bypass past Tonyrefail. Shortly after Tonyrefail the road once again forks, with a junction for the A4233 which links with Trebanog and Porth. The A4119 from here follows the floor of the Valley through woodland and past a small industrial estate with the Village of Williamstown. At this roundabout, the A4119 meets momentarily with its original course before continuing along the old Railway line. The route then bypasses the village of Penygraig and south of Tonypandy, where is progresses down a steep incline. There is a spur with Clydach Vale before the road, still following an old railway line, progresses down to the floor of the valley where the A4119 ends with a roundabout of the A4058. Originally the A4119 continued along Colliers Way and Llwynypia Road, where it again followed its original course, to a Terminus at Llwynypia Hospital with the A4058, but following the completion of the Porth Relief Road, the roads were re-numbered. Therefore, Colliers Way and the Tonypandy North Bypass are now part of the A4058 Pontypridd to Treorchy route.
