= A4059 road =

Road in Wales

A4059

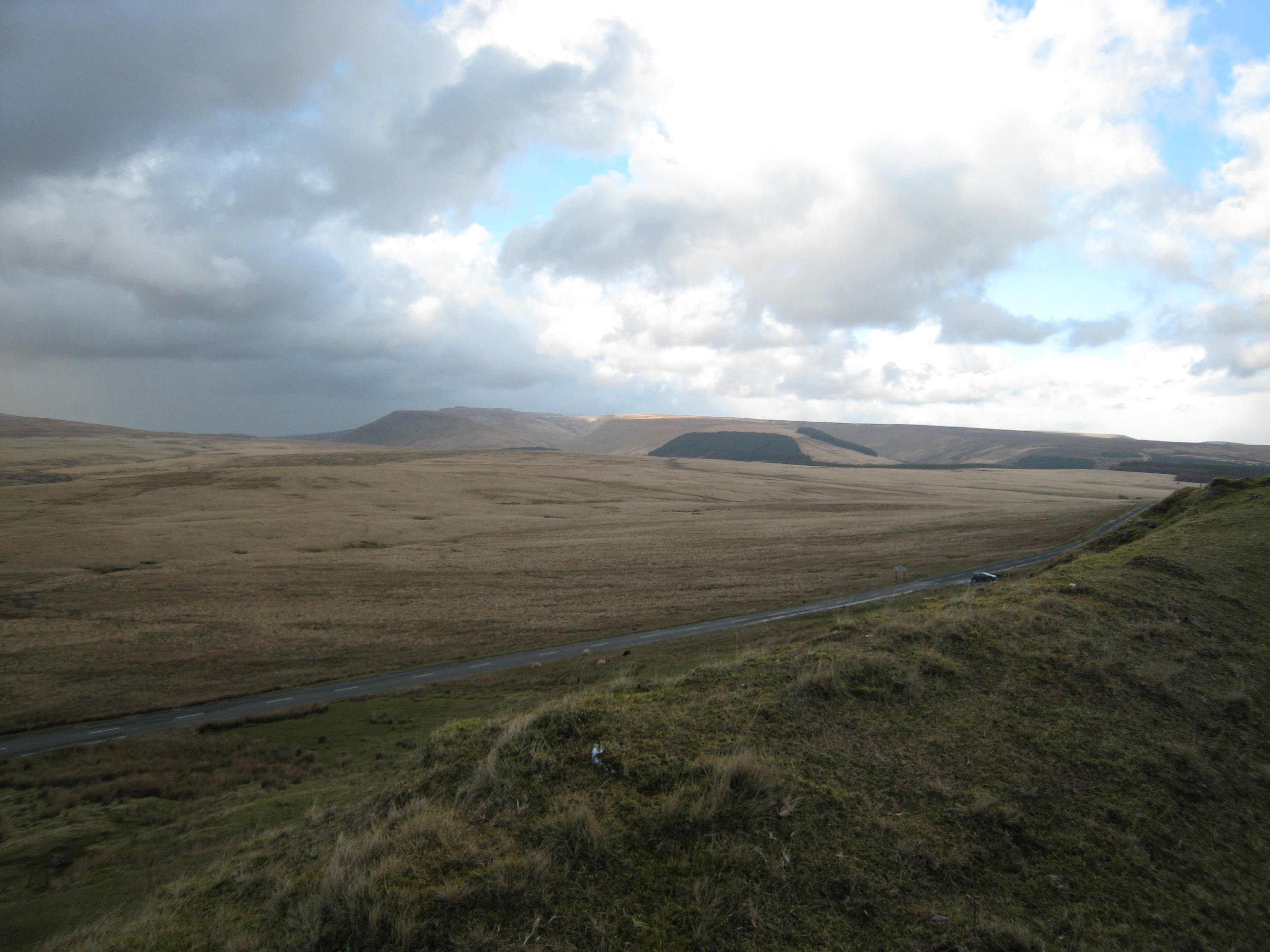
- The A4059 passes through the Brecon Beacons

Route information
- Length: 9.5 mi (15.3 km)

Major junctions
- North end: A470, Beacons Reservoir
- A470 A465 A4061 A465 A470
- South end: A470, Abercynon

Location
- Country: United Kingdom
- Constituent country: Wales
- Primary destinations: Hirwaun; Aberdare; Mountain Ash; Abercynon

Road network
- Roads in the United Kingdom; Motorways; A and B road zones
← A4058	→ A4060

The A4059 road is a single-carriageway north–south road that runs between the A470 at Brecon Beacons National Park and the A470 at Abercynon.

== Route ==
The road can be thought of as an alternative, but slightly longer route than the A470, the road on which both its termini are. It is a road with two parts of contrasting character, the northern half crossing through the wild rural Brecon Beacons while the southern half is at a lower elevation and is urban in nature.

Southbound, the A4059 begins by turning right off the A470 to the south of Storey Arms, just after passing the Beacons Reservoir. The road crosses the top of the reservoir's dam before climbing away from the trees and onto exposed moor land to the west of the A470. Thereafter the A4059 climbs to a height of 450 metres (1,480 ft), following the River Taff 100 m below. At this point along the road, the A470 can be clearly seen in the valley below. As the A4059 continues through the Brecon Beacons, the vegetation is limited to coarse grass, and there are plenty of sheep. Leaving the park after passing through the small village of Penderyn, the road descends into Hirwaun, the first major destination on the southbound A4059. The A4059 was once synonymous with the A465 for a short distance past Hirwaun, however following the construction of the new A465 dual carriageway and re-routing of the A465 to the South, this short section of road is now simply numbered as the A4059. When the road leaves Hirwaun, it then turns southeast and follows the Cynon River, passing through Aberdare and Mountain Ash, although most of this urban stretch now runs on a new relief road, so avoiding the centres of the towns. Eventually, the A4059 reaches its southern terminus of Abercynon and rejoins the A470.

== Planned Future Development ==
In October 2018, Cabinet Members allocated £1 million to a future scheme that would "extend the Aberdare Bypass and link the A4059 to the A465 Heads of the Valleys Road", which is also due to be improved.

In July 2019, Rhondda Cynon Taf County Borough Council began traffic monitoring exercises around the A4059 to assess traffic flow, which would inform the planned future development.

The proposed extension is part of a wider investment programme currently being undertaken by Rhondda Cynon Taf County Borough Council. This project would connect key parts of Aberdare directly to the A465 at Croesbychan, which would reduce journey times and relieve Penywaun and Hirwaun of excessive traffic flow.
