= A470 road =

Major long-distance road in Wales

A470

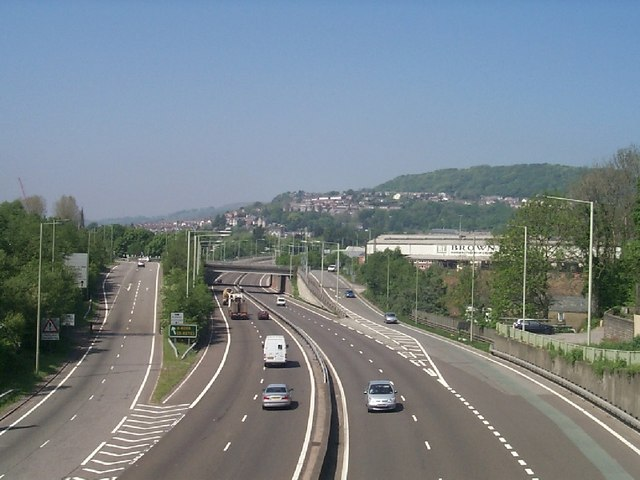
- The A470 dual carriageway at Pontypridd.

Route information
- Maintained by North and Mid Wales Trunk Road Agency and South Wales Trunk Road Agency
- Length: 186 mi (299 km)

Major junctions
- From: Cardiff
- A4119 A4160; A48 A469; M4 A4054 A468 A4058 A4223 A4059 A472 A4060 A4102 A465 A4215; A40 A479 A483 A4081; A44 A489 A458 A487 A494; A5; A55 A547
- To: Llandudno

Location
- Country: United Kingdom
- Primary destinations: Pontypridd; Merthyr Tydfil; Brecon; Builth Wells; Rhayader; Llanidloes; Dolgellau; Blaenau Ffestiniog; Betws-y-Coed

Road network
- Roads in the United Kingdom; Motorways; A and B road zones

The A470 (also named the Cardiff to Glan Conwy Trunk Road) is a trunk road in Wales. It is the country's longest road at 186 miles (299 km) and links the capital Cardiff on the south coast to Llandudno on the north coast. While previously one had to navigate the narrow roads of Llanidloes and Dolgellau, both these market towns are now bypassed due to extensive road modernisation. The 26 miles (42 km) from Cardiff Bay to Merthyr Tydfil are mainly dual carriageway, but most of the route from north of Merthyr to Llandudno is single carriageway.

== Route ==
=== National parks ===
The road travels through two of the national parks of Wales: the Brecon Beacons, and Snowdonia National Park starting just south of Dinas Mawddwy.

=== Cardiff Bay – Merthyr Tydfil ===
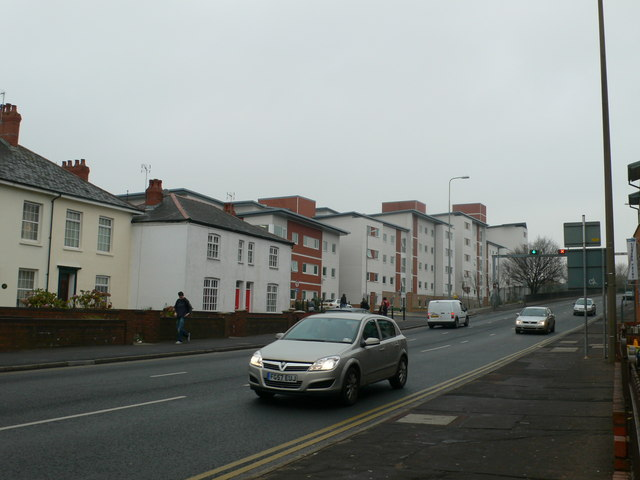
North Road (Cardiff) tidal flow system, a 3-lane single carriageway

The southernmost point of the route is in Cardiff Bay, outside the Wales Millennium Centre. It runs up Lloyd George Avenue (this was previously Collingdon Road, and the A470 previously ran along the parallel Bute Street), and continues along St. Mary Street in central Cardiff. The road then becomes North Road, and after a tidal flow system running to Maindy and then goes over the flyover at the Gabalfa interchange of the A48 and the A469. It becomes an urban dual-carriageway along Manor Way, with a 30 mph (48 km/h) speed limit and with many traffic-signalled crossings. It passes without interruption under the M4 at the giant Coryton roundabout. For the next 15 miles (24 km) it is a modern high-speed dual carriageway by-passing Tongwynlais and Castell Coch, Taff's Well, to Pontypridd. Heading north to Abercynon, the road now follows the route of the Taff Vale Railways Llancaiach Branch to Quakers Yard roundabout, where it is joined by the A4059 from Abercynon, Aberdare and Hirwaun; the A472 from Ystrad Mynach and Pontypool finally the A4054 from Quakers Yard, and Merthyr Tydfil.

From Quakers Yard roundabout (locally known as "Fiddlers Elbow"), 5.5 miles (8.9 km) of dual carriageway takes the road to the Pentrebach roundabout where the A4060 links, and then to the Merthyr Tydfil roundabout where the road meets the A465 and the dual carriageway ends. A twisting section alongside the Taf Fawr reservoirs of Llwyn-on, Cantref and Beacons takes the road to its highest point at Storey Arms on the pass over the Brecon Beacons before a long descent to Brecon.

=== Merthyr Tydfil – Builth Wells ===
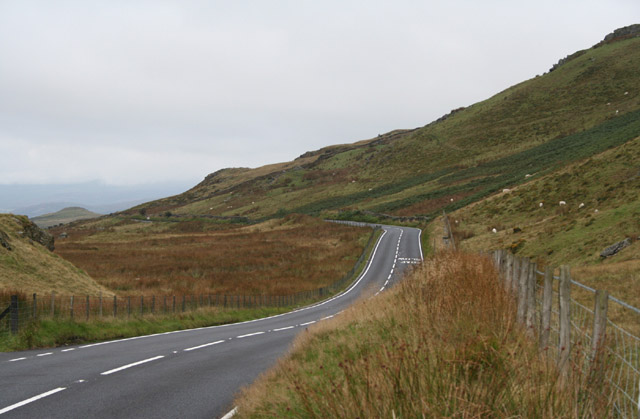
The A470 at Bwlch Oerddrws, between Dinas Mawddwy and Dolgellau

The remainder of the route north of Brecon consists of older routes now renamed "A470". This artificiality is apparent as a driver following the entire route north to south must diverge from the main line of respective stretches of road no fewer than five times. A short three lane stretch heads north east before a sharp left turn is required to stay on the road. From this point on the road becomes narrow and twisting and overtaking is problematic except at a few straight sections. Another sharp left turn at a stop sign in Llyswen takes the road alongside the River Wye into Builth Wells.

=== Builth Wells – Mallwyd ===
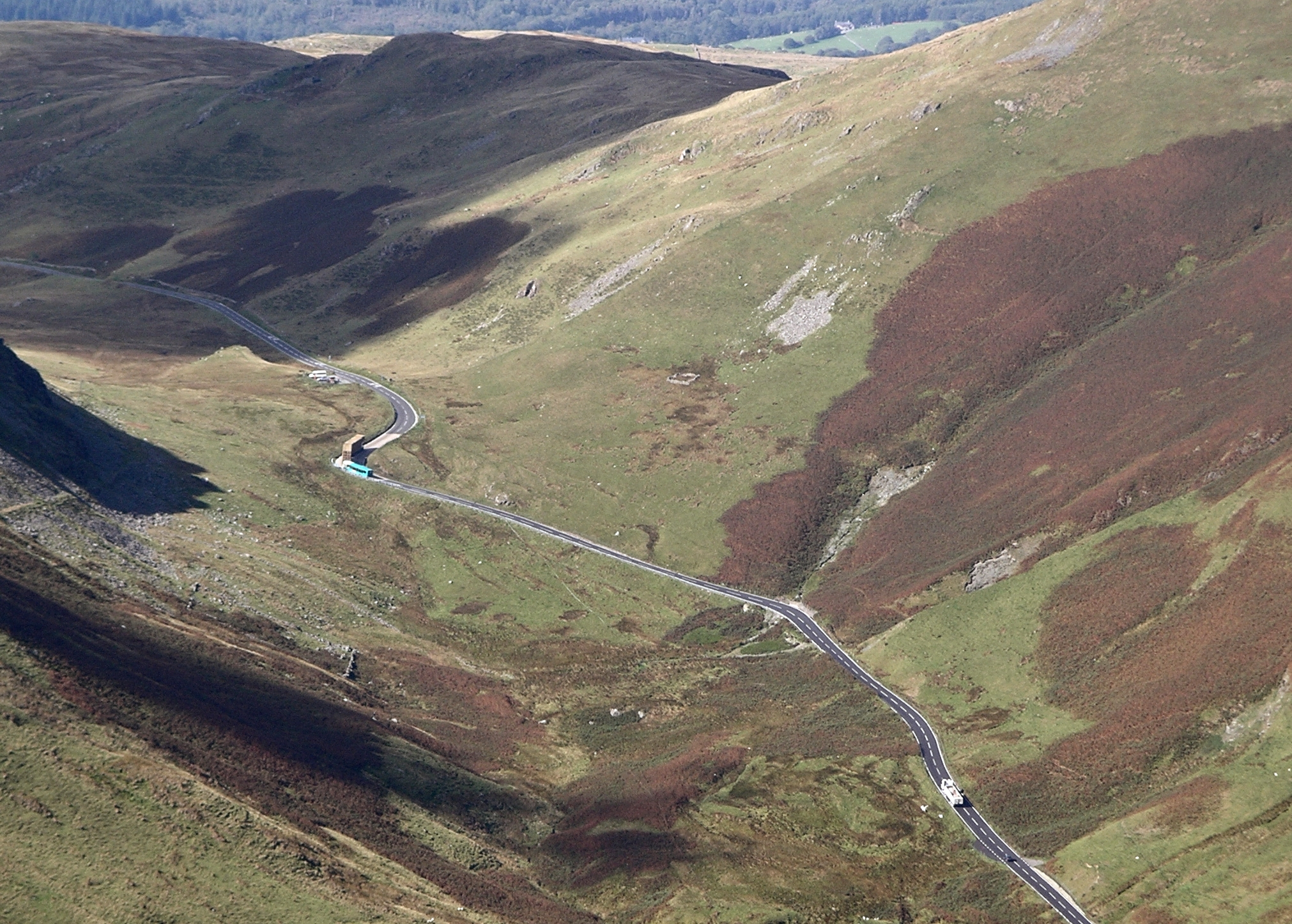
The A470 snaking across Bwlch Oerddrws seen from Maesglase

The road continues to follow the Wye to the busy crossroads where it meets the A44 in the centre of Rhayader. On reaching Llangurig, a right turn outside the village takes the road past Llanidloes and through Llandinam, the birthplace of David Davies and now the headquarters of Girl Guides Wales. Another anomalous left turn at a level crossing sets the path for Caersws, Carno and Llanbrynmair. Just beyond the village of Talerddig the road descends and crosses under the Shrewsbury–Aberystwyth railway line. The long descent towards Commins Coch is a relatively new stretch of road that replaced a set of road-works that had traffic light controlled single lane working for over 10 years because of unstable ground conditions. The river bridge at Commins Coch is so narrow and set at such an angle that only one vehicle at a time can pass. At Cemmaes Road the road joins the A487 at a roundabout. A right turn at the roundabout takes the road on to Mallwyd where the A458 joins at yet another roundabout.

=== Mallwyd – Llandudno ===
The country becomes more forested and the road climbs up through Dinas Mawddwy and then steeply up the eastern foot-hills of Cadair Idris before dropping down to the Dolgellau by-pass. More sharp twists and turns in the forestry and through the village of Ganllwyd brings the road up onto the high plateau of the Cambrian dome where the road follows the ancient track of Sarn Helen Roman road passing the redundant nuclear power station at Trawsfynydd. A right turn beyond the power station takes the road on to Ffestiniog and Blaenau Ffestiniog before heading over the Crimea Pass to Dolwyddelan. A sharp left turn interrupts the A470 as it becomes the A5 for a short distance towards Betws-y-Coed before turning right again back onto the A470 just before Waterloo Bridge. Passing down the valley of the River Conwy the road passes through Llanrwst, Tal-y-Cafn and Glan Conwy, at which point there is a dual roundabout that intersects with the A55 North Wales Expressway before descending into Llandudno. The northernmost point of the route is in Llandudno itself at the sea front, where it meets the North Shore Parade, the A547.

== Junctions ==
This list is for the section between Cardiff and Merthyr Tydfil.

A470 (T)
Northbound exits	Junction	Southbound exits
Newport, Bridgend M4, Tongwynlais A4054	M4 Junction 32 – Coryton Interchange	Start of A470 (T)
Taff's Well, Tongwynlais A4054, Radyr B4262	Taff's Well Interchange	Taff's Well, Tongwynlais A4054, Radyr B4262
Treforest Industrial Estate, Taff's Well A4054, Caerphilly A468	Nantgarw Interchange	Treforest Industrial Estate, Taff's Well A4054, Caerphilly A468
Treforest Industrial Estate, Taff's Well A4054, Llantrisant A473	Upper Boat Interchange	Treforest Industrial Estate, Taff's Well A4054, Llantrisant A473
Llantrisant ( A473)	Glyntaff Interchange	No access
Pontypridd, Rhondda Valleys A4058	Broadway Interchange	No access
No access	Bridge Street Interchange	Pontypridd A4223, Rhondda Valleys ( A4058), Ynys-y-bwl (B4273), Llantrisant ( A473)
Abercynon B4275	Abercynon Interchange	No access
Mountain Ash, Aberdare A4059, Ystrad Mynach https://www.roads.org.uk/motorway/a470/130, Aberfan A4054	Abercynon Roundabout	Mountain Ash, Aberdare A4059, Ystrad Mynach A472
Pentrebach A4060, Abergavenny ( A465)	Abercanaid Roundabout	Pentrebach A4060, Abergavenny ( A465)
Rhyd-y-car A4102	Orbit Roundabout	Rhyd-y-car A4102
Merthyr Tydfil town centre A4102	Swansea Road Roundabout	Merthyr Tydfil town centre A4102
Neath, Abergavenny A465, Brecon A470	Cefn Coed Roundabout	Start of A470 (T)
1.000 mi = 1.609 km; 1.000 km = 0.621 mi: Incomplete access

== History ==
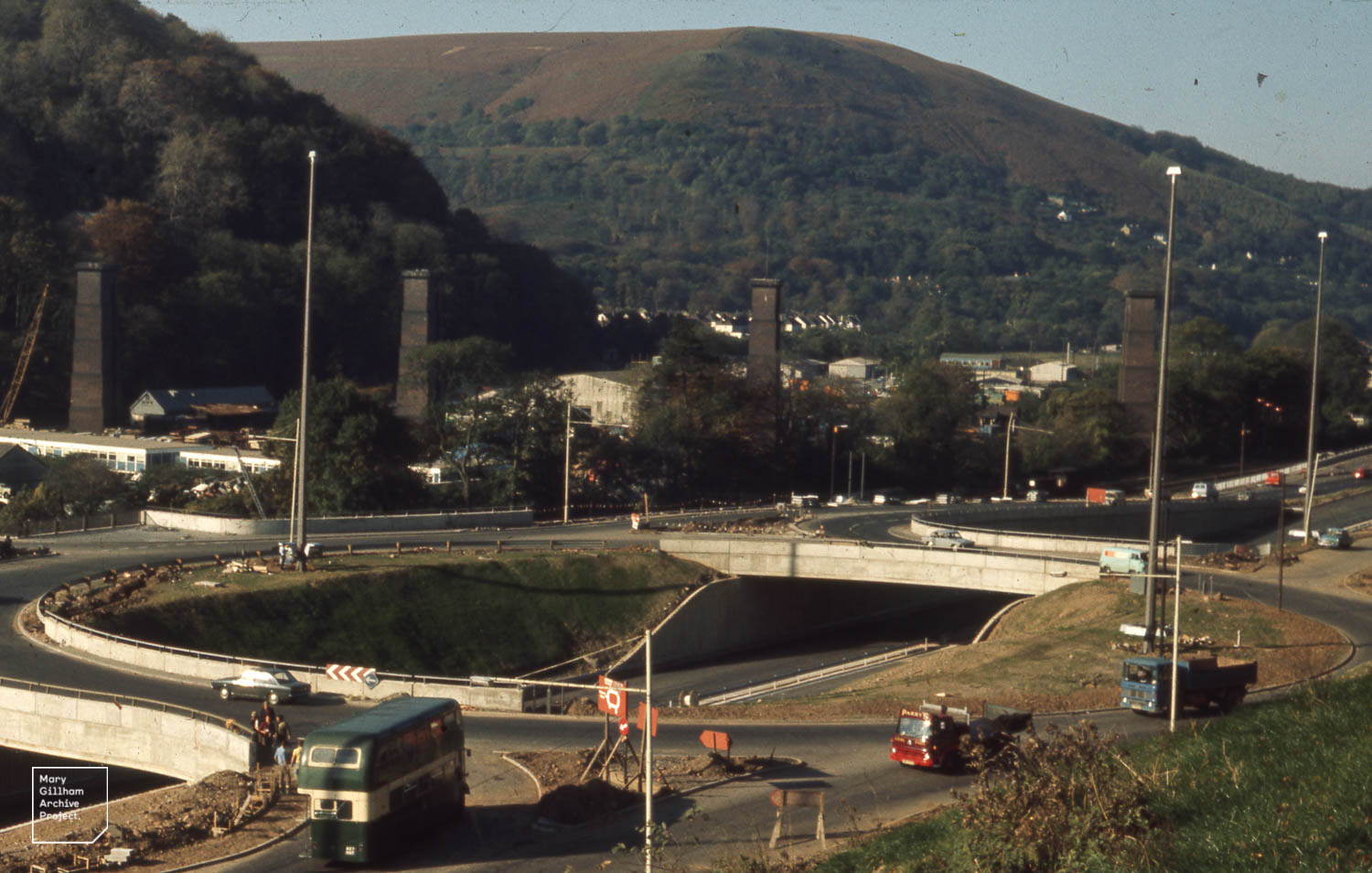
Taff's Well Interchange during construction in November 1971

=== Modern route ===
The modern route of the A470 arose from a campaign in the 1970s by the Western Mail for a single route connecting North and South Wales, in the lead up to the 1979 Welsh devolution referendum. It was successful, and in 1978, the Welsh Office discussed a potential course of the road roughly through the centre of the country, which was implemented the following year.

=== Original route ===
The route from Cardiff to Brecon was the original A470. It originally ran into Brecon town centre and joined the A40 road. The old A470 between the by-pass and the town, along Newgate Street, is now the B4601. A4062 was the number for the section from the junction of the A40 and the B4601 – the Brecon (eastern) bypass to B4602 section. The B4601 was originally the A40 which ran through the town of Brecon. Similarly, the B4602 was originally the westernmost part of the A438.

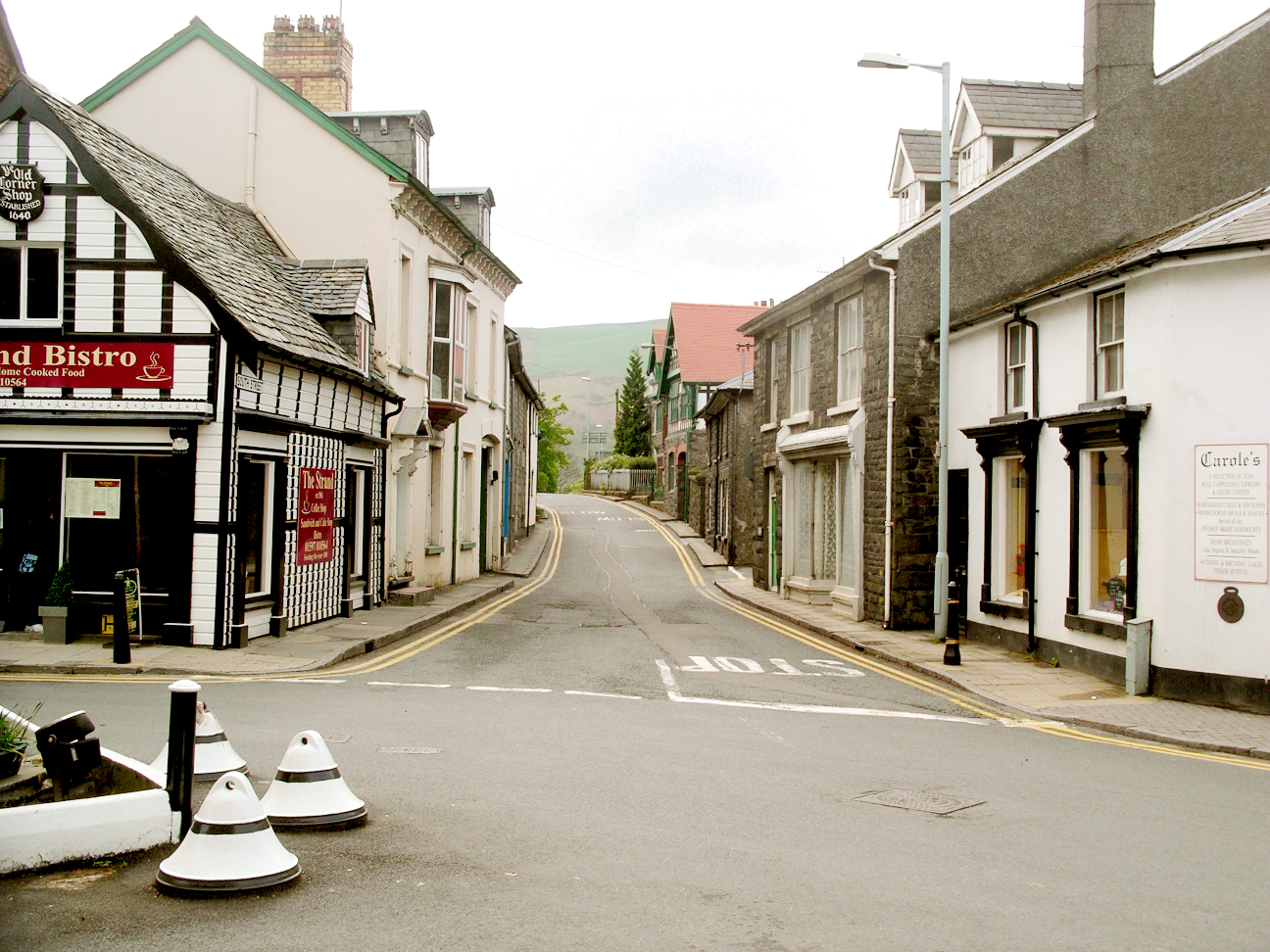
The A470 passing through Rhayader

=== Original road numbers ===
==== Brecon – Llangurig ====
The A438 was the original number for the road from the junction with B4602 to the sharp left turn where A470 turns north in the vicinity of Llanfilo. The A438 continues on from there to Hereford and Tewkesbury. From north of Llanfilo to Llyswen was the A4073. A479 originally linked the A40 west of Crickhowell to the A44 road at Rhayader. The A479 now runs only from Crickhowell to Llyswen. The stretch from Rhayader to Llangurig was the A44. Officially, this is now part of the A470, but some local signage shows A44/A470.

==== Llangurig – Mallwyd ====
From Llangurig to Moat Lane (east of Caersws), it was once part of the A492, which originally ran from Llangurig to Newtown. The section Moat Lane to Newtown has since been renumbered A489, and from Moat Lane to Glantwymyn the A470 replaced the A489 which ran all the way from Machynlleth to the A49 road north of Craven Arms in south Shropshire. Now the A489 designation applies to two roads separated by 17 miles (27 km) of the A470. The stretch between Glantwymyn to Mallwyd was called the A4084.

==== Dolgellau ====
Originally starting at the Cross Foxes near Dolgellau the A458 now runs only from Mallwyd to Shrewsbury. It now starts at Mallwyd with the Mallwyd to Cross Foxes section being the A470. Cross Foxes to near Gellilydan (in the Meirionydd part of Gwynedd south of Ffestiniog) leads to a complicated series of route renumbering. This stretch was originally the A487 which ran through Dolgellau town centre. The modern A470 bypasses the town using the line of the old Ruabon – Morfa Mawddach railway.

==== Gellilydan – Llandudno ====
Gellilydan via Llan Ffestiniog to Blaenau Ffestiniog (Congl-y-Wal) was not originally allocated a number. The section from Blaenau Ffestiniog to Betws-y-Coed was the B4407, and from there to Llandudno was the A544. By 1946, the A496 had become extended to Llandudno.

The section of road from Glan Conwy corner to Llandudno is a new well aligned direct route to Llandudno. The old A496 has been renumbered A547 between Glan Conwy and Llandudno Junction and A546 between Llandudno Junction and Llandudno. The A496 now numbers only the Llanelltyd – Blaenau Ffestiniog coast road.

== Cultural references ==
In 2014, Cerys Matthews presented a documentary on the A470 on BBC Radio 4, journeying from the north of the country to Cardiff Bay. The programme described the road as "the M1 motorway of Wales", despite most of the road being rural single-carriageway, with Matthews stopping off at places like Llanrwst and Rhayader.

In March 2022, Arachne Press published A470: Poems for the Road / Cerddi’r Ffordd, a bilingual English and Welsh book of poems about the A470, edited by Siân Northey and Ness Owen. Published on St. David's Day, by June of that year it had its second reprint.

Other references in Welsh popular culture include:

- a 1993 song by Geraint Lövgreen
- a video and photo exhibition in 2001
- a bi-monthly magazine, subtitled What's on in Literary Wales

== See also ==
- Trunk roads in Wales
