= Llanddewi Velfrey =

Village and parish in Pembrokeshire, Wales

Llanddewi Velfrey: Welsh: Llanddewi Efelffre
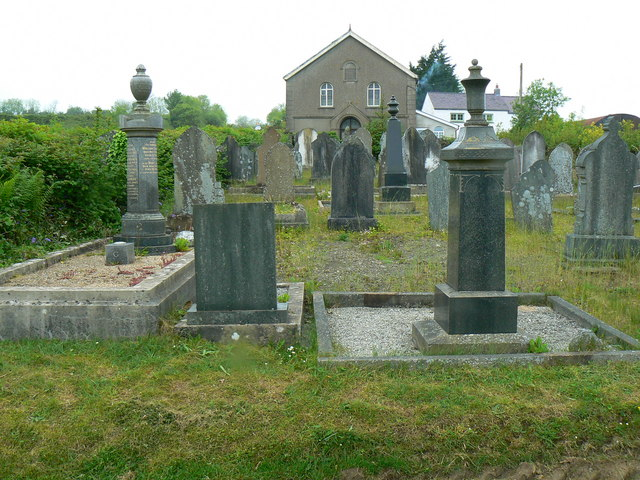
- Bethel Chapel, Llanddewi Velfrey

- Location within Pembrokeshire
- Population: 393
- Principal area: Pembrokeshire
- Country: Wales
- Sovereign state: United Kingdom
- Post town: WHITLAND
- Postcode district: SA34
- Post town: NARBERTH
- Postcode district: SA67
- Police: Dyfed-Powys
- Fire: Mid and West Wales
- Ambulance: Welsh
- UK Parliament: Mid and South Pembrokeshire
- Senedd Cymru – Welsh Parliament: Ceredigion Penfro
- List of places UK Wales Pembrokeshire 51.8198°N 4.6933°W Map of the community

Llanddewi Velfrey (also spelled Llandewi Velfrey or Llan-ddewi-vel-vre; Welsh: Llanddewi Efelffre) is a village, parish and community of Pembrokeshire in West Wales. Historically it was in the Narberth Hundred. The village is in Lampeter Vale, 2 miles (3 km) northeast of Narberth along the A40. In 1831 it had a population of 710 people. In 2011 the population was 393.

The village is situated in a rich and fertile vale, watered by the river Tâf, which separates the parish from that of Llangain in the county of Carmarthen. The lands are wholly enclosed and in a good state of cultivation, and the soil is eminently fertile.

== Landmarks ==
=== St David's Church and related buildings ===
The church, dedicated to St David, is remarkable for the simplicity of its architecture, and displays evident features of a very remote antiquity: an elegant mural tablet of white marble, to the memory of the late David Lewis, Esq., of Hênllan and his youngest daughter, which were put up in the chancel by his widow c.1830. There is a rectory and a vicarage, in the archdeaconry of Carmarthen, and Diocese of St Davids. A schoolhouse was built at the expense of the parish in 1828.

The church was rebuilt in 1757, but retains its "archaic 16th century two-bay arcade" with Tudor arches. It was restored in 1861 and the tall western bellcote was added in 1891 by G. E. Halliday. The vicarage house was nearly rebuilt on an enlarged scale under the provisions of the Gilbert's Act.

=== Bethel Congregational Chapel ===
Bethel Congregational Chapel lies about 1 mile (1.6 km) to the northeast. It is dated to 1849, with a porch dated to 1912.

=== Country houses ===
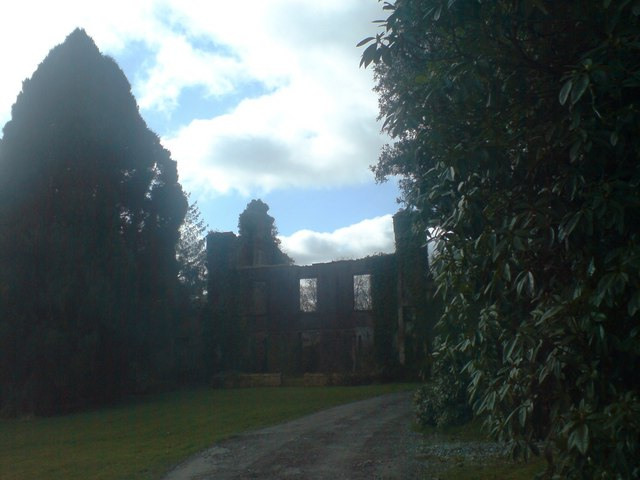
Plas Crwd

Notable country houses associated with the area include Trewern Mansion, Hênllan and Plas Crwn.

Trewern Mansion is a grade II listed building located about 1 1/2 miles (2.4 km) to the northeast of the village. It was built around 1824 and is three storeys high having a five bay frontage with a three-bay Doric porch and a nine bay rear elevation opposite a large pond. It was the residence of John Thomas Beynon in the 1830s. In 1906 it descended via the Protheroe and Schaw families to Godfrey Evan Schaw Protheroe-Beynon, who was appointed High Sheriff of Carmarthenshire for 1907. It was still in the possession of the Protheroe-Beynon family in 1959.

Hênllan, demolished in 1957, was an Italianate stuccoed mansion about 1 mile (1.6 km) to the west, built in 1854 for a John L. G. P. Lewis, replacing an earlier house.

Plas Crwn, now in ruins, was also a notable house in the parish, 1/3 mile (500 m) to the south. It dates to the late 19th century with "castellated fake corner towers and little wings". The cow shed is "heightened in red brick, with little Diocletian windows."

=== Parc-y-lan ===
This public house is located along the A40 road. The Hidden Places Of Wales says of it, "Parc-y-lan Inn is a charming place that dates from the 16th century and, inside, many of this ancient building's original features can still be seen including the fabulous beamed ceiling in the dining room."

== Notable people ==
- David Lewis (1682–1760), an 18th-century British poet, thought to be the son of Roger Lewis of Llandewi Velfrey.
