= Wilton, Herefordshire =

Village in Herefordshire, England

Coordinates: 51.915°N 2.600°W

Wilton
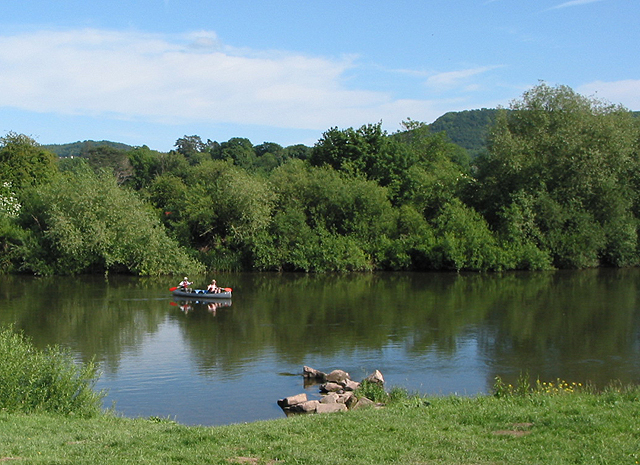
- River Wye at Wilton Bridge

- Location within Herefordshire
- OS grid reference: SO589242
- Unitary authority: Herefordshire
- Ceremonial county: Herefordshire
- Region: West Midlands
- Country: England
- Sovereign state: United Kingdom
- Post town: ROSS-ON-WYE
- Postcode district: HR9
- Dialling code: 01989
- Police: West Mercia
- Fire: Hereford and Worcester
- Ambulance: West Midlands
- UK Parliament: Hereford and South Herefordshire

Wilton is a village in south Herefordshire, England, just under a mile west of the market town of Ross-on-Wye.

In 1100, Henry I set up three royal manors in Herefordshire, including the manor of Wilton. This included a number of surrounding villages such as Peterstow.

Wilton Bridge was a major crossing of the River Wye and was protected by Wilton Castle. Both suffered significant damage during the English Civil War. The bridge has been restored and strengthened and updated with a sundial.

Now the village is known for the roundabout where the A49 trunk road joins the A40. Being a convenient staging point it has several hotels.
