= A479 road =

Trunk road in Wales

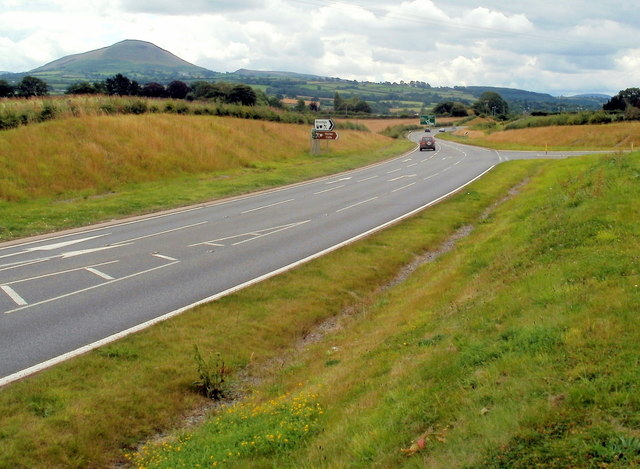
The A479 bypassing Bronllys

The A479, officially also known as the Glanusk Park (Crickhowell)—Llyswen Trunk Road, is a trunk road in Wales. It connects Crickhowell to Llyswen via the Rhiangoll valley and Talgarth, running through the Brecon Beacons National Park.

== Route ==
The road starts at Glanusk Park near Crickhowell and runs roughly in a northerly direction to Llyswen, where it joins the A470 road. It runs entirely within the county of Powys and is a single carriageway throughout its length. From Crickhowell to Talgarth, the road is in the Brecon Beacons National Park, and follows the Rhiangoll valley. The southern end is near Tretower Castle and Court.

== History ==
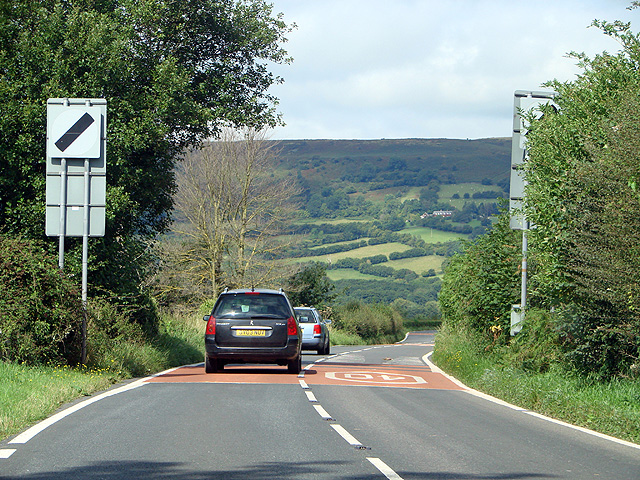
A479 north of Tretower

The A479 originally ran through Builth Wells to Rhayader. This part of the road is now the A470. A short section of road near Llyswen was realigned in 1995.

A bypass of Talgarth and Bronllys began construction in 2006. Part of the Talgarth bypass runs on the former Mid-Wales Railway. Because this part of the road runs through the Brecon Beacons, additional treatment was needed to minimise disruption with the nearby countryside. This included a specific alignment of the highway, and replanting of hedgerows to fit in with the existing parts of the road. The bypass opened in 2009.

== Traffic ==
In 2005, the A479 was listed as one of the most dangerous roads in Wales in an AA Motorway Trust report. In 2013, another report suggested the same.

The section of the A479 between Pengenffordd and Talgarth has had regular issues with subsidence. A section south of Talgarth was closed in March 2016. In February 2017, the road was closed for an extended period in order to lay new foundation work. In February 2020, a section of the road near Talgarth was closed following a collapse during Storm Dennis. The damage affected the surface and foundation of the road, resulting it being closed until November.

== See also ==
- Trunk roads in Wales
