= Fforest (Carmarthenshire) =

Upland in Carmarthenshire, Wales

Coordinates: 52°01′55″N 3°47′46″W

Fforest is a small upland area adjoining the Vale of Towy, some 4 km north of the town of Llandovery in Carmarthenshire, Wales. Stretching for a distance of 4 km from southwest to northeast the area rises to two separate summits either side of a broad saddle; one at 297m in the south and a second one to the northeast crowned by a triangulation pillar which attains a height of 341m. The ridge is privately owned hence there is no public access to any part of it though it is encircled by public roads and paths. The hills are formed from silty grey mudstones of uppermost/latest Ordovician age ascribed to the Yr Allt Formation.
