= Survive Group =

The SURVIVE Group is a UK based consortium of private and public sector organisations concerned primarily with road safety. SURVIVE stands for Safe Use of Roadside Verges in Vehicular Emergencies

== History and operations ==
The Survive Group was created by firms in the UK vehicle breakdown recovery industry in 1998 after the events following up to the deaths of six roadside operators working with car breakdowns. The industry was joined soon thereafter by the Highways Agency and the Association of Chief Police Officers in what become known as The Survive Group. The member organisations believe that it is necessary to create public awareness about safety in breakdown conditions on the hard shoulder for both drivers and workers and that creating a public awareness organisation would best serve this purpose.

== Working Groups ==
The Survive Group is composed of the Survive Executive and 4 Working Groups. The Survive Executive is the body that sets strategic direction for the consortium.

=== Working Group 1 ===
This group is concerned primarily with protocols and best practices on the road. Members include such prominent organisations as the Association of Chief Police Officers, the AA, and RAC. This working group lays emphasis on learning from accidents and near-misses. Data is shared across the group in order to promulgate instructions and operating standards. A Best Practices Guidelines document is in progress and will be published on the Survive Group’s website.

=== Working Group 2 ===
The second working group deals with industry standards and their implementation. A major achievement of this working group has been the PAS 43:2008 document, which provides guidelines for attending car breakdowns.

=== Working Group 3 ===
The third working group deals with roadside operator conspicuity and visibility. Poor visibility can be a safety hazard in the work environment, and therefore this working group makes the necessary recommendations to make roadside operators more visible and safe. Key issues addressed by the Group include traffic officers’ use of safety red lights and the introduction of more stable arrow signs that are able to withstand extreme weather conditions.

=== Working Group 4 ===
The fourth working group manages communications between Survive Group’s working groups as well as between the organisation, its stakeholders and the general public.

== Members Organisations ==
The Survive Group is composed of the following organisations. These include private and public sector organisations.

- Association of Chief Police Officers
- The Automobile Association
- Green Flag
- Highways Agency
- RAC Motoring Services
- Road Haulage Association – Rescue Recovery Group
- Vehicle and Operator Services Agency
- Association of British Certification Bodies
- Association of British Insurers
- Association of Vehicle Recovery Operators
- AXA Assistance
- Britannia Rescue
- Europe-Assistance Holdings Limited
- Habilis Health and Safety Solutions Limited
- Institute of Vehicle Recovery
- Allianz Partners UK
- National Tyre Distributors Association
- Recovery Equipment Manufacturers and Suppliers Association
- Retail Motor Industry Federation
- Road Maintenance Contractors
- Home Office Scientific Development Branch
- Transport Research Laboratory

== See also ==
- Highways Agency
