= National Roads Telecommunications Services =

The National Roads Telecommunications Service is the fibre-optic network of communication and control used by National Highways to monitor England's roads. Its design has allowed for active traffic management and managed motorways in England.

== History ==
Prior to 2005, the motorway network was controlled by the National Motorway Communication System (NMCS). This network was not fibre-optic or digitally controlled.

The £490 million contract for the NRTS was awarded to the GeneSYS Consortium on 19 September 2005. GeneSYS Consortium is a group of companies led by the Fluor Corporation and is a Public–private partnership.

The system is designed to allow a national scheme of road pricing, possibly using radio-frequency identification tags. The cost of the project was described by the Association of British Drivers as being "an awful lot to spend just for signs saying that motorways are closed and that you should not drink and drive."

In 2017, a second contract for the NRTS was awarded to Telent. Starting on 16 March 2018, the £450 million contract was set to run for 7 years, but was extended to run until 2027.

== Structure ==
The NRTS is an intelligent transportation system based at the Quinton Business Park at Quinton, Birmingham. Video images are sent over fibre-optic cables to form a switched video network. The fibre-optic system was deployed with Guardian-Lite 3700 controllers, made by AMG Systems of Biggleswade, which allow uncompressed video signals and other data to be sent at the same time.

=== Companies ===
- Fluor
- Peek Traffic
- Mott MacDonald
- Alcatel-Lucent - based the system on its 1692 Metrospan Edge CWDM (coarse wavelength-division multiplexing) platform, with the 7750 Service Router, and OmniPCX enterprise voice-over-IP switch (made by the CSBU subsidiary). Alcatel-Lucent own Genesys Conferencing.

== Function ==
It controls traffic on England's motorways and major A roads.

=== Customers of the NRTS ===
- Traffic police (Road Policing Units) and their Police Control Offices
- Traffic England - real-time website
- Traffic Radio
- TrafficMaster

== See also ==
- Traffic Scotland
- Traffic Cops

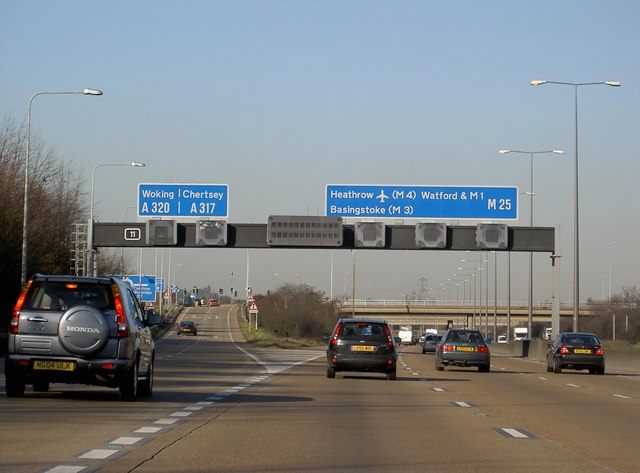
Message signs at junction 11 of the M25
