= Off-Network Tactical Diversion Route =

Pre-designated road detours in UK

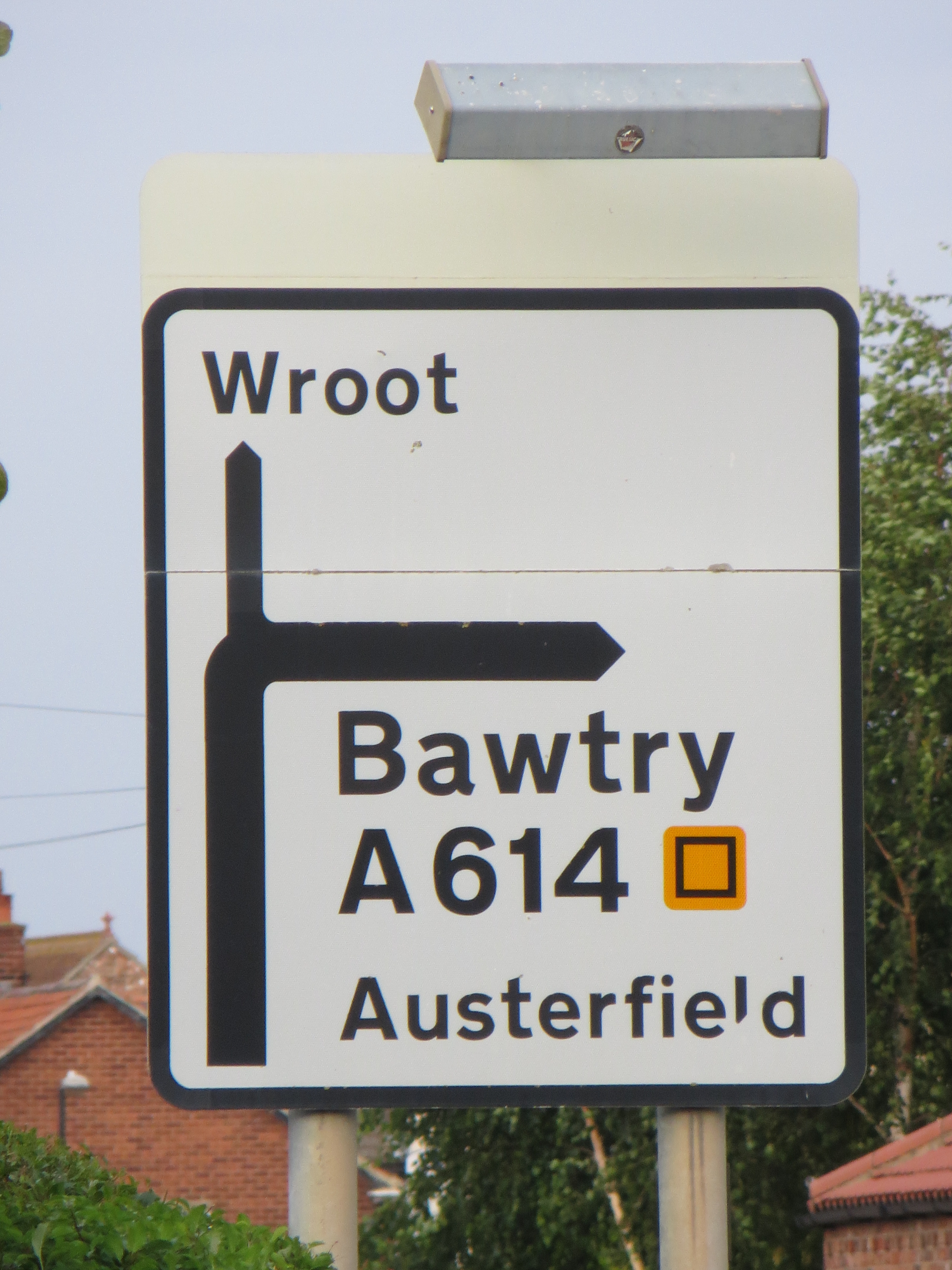
The yellow square symbol on this sign on the A614 road indicates a diversion route for the M18 motorway.

In the United Kingdom, emergency diversion routes, formally known as off-network tactical diversion routes, are permanently signed detour routes: planned road traffic routes that bypass the main trunk road network.

Emergency diversion routes provide the public, where possible, with a planned, checked and agreed junction to junction diversion route that circumnavigates an incident which has resulted in the closure of the main carriageway. In some other locations, suitable diversion routes are not possible; this then requires National Highways and its partners to implement alternative tactics such as strategic signs and signals. These are managed by the National Traffic Control Centre (NTCC).

Emergency diversion routes are marked with road signs in the form of simple geometric shapes – open and filled circles, squares, and diamonds. Normally, these additions to roadsigns will be ignored by drivers.

When an incident closes a motorway or trunk road, police and National Highways traffic officers can activate 'trigger signs' at junctions before a closure advising traffic as to which symbol to follow around the incident along an alternative road and bring road users back onto the motorway or main road at a later junction beyond the closure.

The signs used for these routes can be found in the publication Know your Traffic Signs.

== Emergency diversion route symbols ==
=== Solid versions ===
Solid circle

Solid square

Solid triangle

Solid diamond

=== Hollow versions ===
Hollow circle

Hollow square

Hollow triangle

Hollow diamond

=== Related signs ===
Diversion trigger sign – the M1 Motorway is closed ahead, follow the 'hollow diamond' diversion to arrive back at the M1 after the closure.

== See also ==
- National Traffic Control Centre
- Road signs in the United Kingdom
