= South Wales Trunk Road Agent =

Trunk road agent in Wales

- Native name: Asiant Cefnffyrdd De Cymru (Welsh)
- Formerly: South Wales Trunk Road Agency
- Type: Welsh Government agency
- Industry: Trunk road agent (Highway authority)
- Founded: 1 April 2006
- Headquarters: The Quays; Brunel Way; Briton Ferry; Neath
- Area served: South Wales: Blaenau Gwent; Bridgend County Borough; Caerphilly County Borough; Cardiff; Carmarthenshire; Merthyr Tydfil County Borough; Monmouthshire; Neath Port Talbot (lead); Newport; Pembrokeshire; Rhondda Cynon Taf; Swansea; Torfaen; Vale of Glamorgan
- Key people: Richard Jones (Head of Service)
- Owner: Welsh Government
- Number of employees: 124 (2015)
- Website: traffic.wales/south-wales-trunk-road-agent-swtra

Map of the trunk road agent's coverage.

The South Wales Trunk Road Agent (SWTRA; Welsh: Asiant Cefnffyrdd De Cymru) is one of the two trunk road agents in Wales. It is responsible for managing motorways and trunk roads in South Wales on behalf of the Welsh Government. Established on 1 April 2006 as the South Wales Trunk Road Agency, and renamed to its current name on 1 April 2012. The agent manages the motorways and trunk roads in the fourteen principal areas of the south of Wales, from the Severn Bridge in the east to Milford Haven in the west. The remainder of Wales is managed by the North and Mid Wales Trunk Road Agent.

== History ==
Prior to the South Wales Trunk Road Agency being established, motorways and trunk roads in Wales were managed by the Ministry of Transport, later being taken on by the Welsh Office. The National Assembly for Wales took responsibility for devolved powers on 1 July 1999, as part of this process, transport was transferred from the Parliament of the United Kingdom to the National Assembly for Wales and with it responsibility for the trunk road network, including motorways. Responsibility for the management of highways in Wales is split between the Welsh Government and local highway agencies. The Welsh Government is responsible for trunk roads and motorways, whilst the 22 local authorities are responsible for all other highways.

In 2001 the Welsh Government reviewed the way in which trunk roads and motorways were being managed, and by September 2004, they had decided to reduce the number of trunk road agencies from eight down to three. The three new agencies including the South Wales Trunk Road Agency (SWTRA), which was later renamed the South Wales Trunk Road Agent.

The South Wales Trunk Road Agency (SWTRA) acts as Agent Highway Authority for the Welsh Government

Neath Port Talbot County Borough Council manage and maintains the trunk road network on behalf of the Transport and Strategic Regeneration division of the Welsh Government for SWTRA.

As of April 2015, out of a total of 34,495 miles (55,514 km) of roads in Wales, 1,576 kilometres (979 mi) are trunk roads (including 133 kilometres (83 mi) of motorways and 350 kilometres (220 mi) of dual carriageway).

In 2026, the Welsh Government announced that the SWTRA and the North and Mid Wales Trunk Road Agent would be merged with Traffic Wales to form Highways Wales.

== Roads managed ==
Road number	Route within SWTRA
M4	Second Severn Crossing - Pont Abraham
M48	Severn Bridge - M4, Junction 23 Plaza
A48(M)	M4, Junction. 29 - A48 Western Avenue.
A40	England Border at Monmouth - Fishguard.
A48	Chepstow - Carmarthen.
A449	M4, Junction 24, Coldra - A40, Raglan Interchange.
A465	Llangua - M4, Junction 43, Llandarcy.
A466	Newhouse Roundabout - A48(T) Highbeech Roundabout.
A470	M4, Cyffordd 32, Coryton – A465, Cefn Coed.
A477	A40 Junction, St Clears - Pembroke Dock.
A483	Pont Abraham - A40, Rhosmaen.
A487	A40, Fishguard - Stand Back Lane.
A4042	M4, Junction 25A - A40 Hardwick Roundabout, Abergavenny.
A4060	A470, Junction at Pentre-bach - A465, Dowlais Junction.
A4076	Milford - A40, Haverfordwest.
A4232	M4, Junction 33, Capel Llanilltern - Culverhouse Cross Interchange.

== See also ==
- Trunk roads in Wales
- Highways in England and Wales
- Trunk road
- Trunk road agent
- North and Mid Wales Trunk Road Agent
- Roads in the United Kingdom
- List of motorways in the United Kingdom
- Welsh Government Traffic Officer
