= A499 road =

Road in Wales

A499

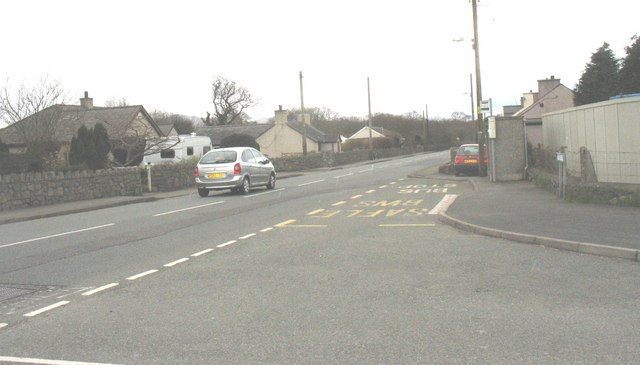
- The A499 at Bethesda Bach

Route information
- Length: 23.4 mi (37.7 km)

Major junctions
- North end: A487

- A497
- South end: Abersoch

Location
- Country: United Kingdom
- Constituent country: Wales

Road network
- Roads in the United Kingdom; Motorways; A and B road zones

The A499 road is the major road of the Llŷn peninsula in North Wales.

Its northern terminus is a roundabout with the A487 trunk road between Llanwnda and Llandwrog (53.0948°N 4.2824°W). It then runs south-westerly along the northern coast of the peninsula, through Clynnog Fawr, then turns inland, crossing the peninsula to meet the southern coast at Pwllheli, it then follows the southern coast to terminate at Abersoch (52.8227°N 4.5054°W).

The road is approximately 23.4 miles (37.7 km) long. At no point is it a trunk road, although the Welsh Assembly has considered upgrading its status.

== Improvements ==
Work started in February 2008 to upgrade the road between Aberdesach and Llanaelhaearn and also bypass Clynnog Fawr. This work is expected to complete in Summer 2009. Previous work in 2006/2007 had cleared the new route of trees and erected boundary fencing.

== See also ==
- Great Britain road numbering scheme
