= Event Mobile Tyres =

- Industry: Tyre sales
- Founded: 31 October 2003 in Tansley, Derbyshire, United Kingdom
- Founders: Gary Moloney and Mark Shankland
- Defunct: 29 June 2022
- Fate: Disillusion
- Headquarters: Manchester, United Kingdom, United Kingdom
- Area served: United Kingdom
- Website: http://www.event-tyres.co.uk/ (defunct)

Event Mobile Tyres was an online tyre retailer in the United Kingdom and the first mobile online tyre retailer to use chip and pin mobile devices in the UK. They were members of the National Tyre Distributors Association.

Event Mobile Tyres had a Head Office and depot in Manchester, a Northern Control Centre in Warrington and a Southern Control Centre in Henley on Thames. Between these 3 locations they operated more than 30 vans that were located strategically around the country.

The vans were assigned to one of the control centres, based on their location, and were stocked daily via a number of key stocking points. All the vans were self-sufficient mobile tyre fitting centres equipped with a compressor, tyre fitting machine, electronic wheel balancer, several vehicle jacks and all the tools of the trade required to do the job.

== Background (1927 - 2003) ==
In July 1927 the Goodyear Tire and Rubber Company established a tyre manufacturing factory in Bushbury, Wolverhampton, England. It was founded on the Bushbury Works site originally belonging to Macfarlane & Robinson Limited, manufacturers of enamel hardware. Goodyear purchased the Bushbury Works Site and associated railway sidings for 75,000 GBP freehold from Macfarlane & Robinson Limited on 11 July 1927. Tyre manufacturing at the site began by December 1927.

George Sproson, an employee at Goodyear’s Wolverhampton factory, left Goodyear in 1930. He purchased a tyre mould and started Hayson Tyre Service Limited, re-moulding tyres.

In August 1970, National Tyre Service Limited, commonly known as National Tyre, purchased Hayson Tyres from George Sproson as part of their buy-out of regional independent tyre companies to form a national network of tyre fitting centres.

In the same year, George Sproson’s son-in-law, Chris Shankland, who at the time was working with Michelin as a National Accounts Manager, began Town and Country Tyre Services with Sproson’s assistance. The company was registered as Town and Country Tyres (London) Limited, and became a successful tyre fitting company with both Chris Shankland and his son, Mark Shankland, as company directors.

Town and Country Tyres were acquired by Kwik-Fit Holdings in February 1994. After the acquisition Mark Shankland became Operations Director at Kwik-Fit Mobile, the company’s mobile tyre fitting division. There he met Gary Moloney, then Control Director at Kwik-Fit Mobile. Using their mobile tyre fitting knowledge and experience, the two of them began Event Mobile Tyres Ltd in 2003.

Event Mobile Tyres filed for administration on 11 April 2018. Administration ended in 2019 and the company ceased operations in 2022.

== Awards ==
Event Mobile Tyres was honoured with several awards including the Honest John "Outstanding Achievement Award" which is awarded to the UK's most consistently endorsed company in the motor trade.
