= Design Manual for Roads and Bridges =

Highway standards in the United Kingdom

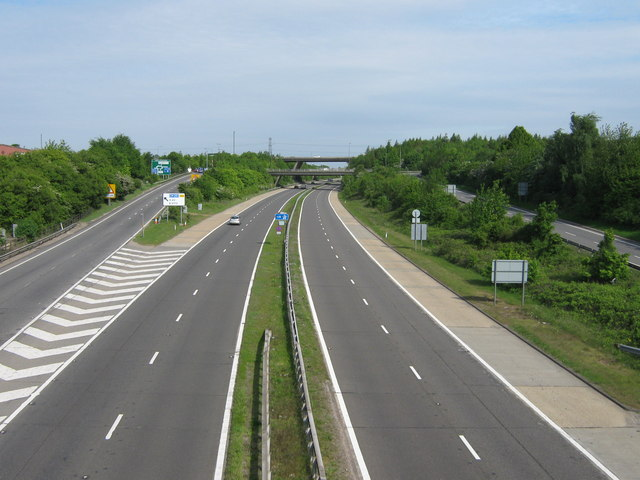
The DMRB is used to design trunk roads such as the A20 in the UK.

The Design Manual for Roads and Bridges (DMRB) is a series of 15 volumes that provide standards, advice notes and other documents relating to the design, assessment and operation of trunk roads, including motorways in the United Kingdom, and, with some amendments, the Republic of Ireland. It also forms the basis of the road design standards used in many other countries.

DMRB volumes form part of a suite of technical documents produced by National Highways, which comprises:

- Design Manual for Roads and Bridges (DMRB)
- Manual of Contract Documents for Highway Works (MCHW)
- Asset Maintenance and Operation Requirements (AMOR) which supersedes the Network Maintenance Manual and Routine and Winter Service Codes, and its predecessor the Trunk Road Maintenance Manual

== Overview ==
The volumes within the Design Manual for Roads and Bridges are:

Volume 0 – Introduction and General requirements
Volume 1 – Highway Structures: Approval Procedures and General Design
Volume 2 – Highway Structures: Design (Substructures and Special Structures), Materials
Volume 3 – Highway Structures: Inspection and Maintenance
Volume 4 – Geotechnics and Drainage
Volume 5 - Assessment and Preparation of Road Schemes
Volume 6 - Road Geometry
Volume 7 - Pavement Design and Maintenance
Volume 8 - Traffic Signs and Lighting
Volume 9 - Traffic Control and Communications
Volume 10 - Environmental Design
Volume 11 - Environmental Assessment
Volume 12 - Traffic Appraisal of Road Schemes
Volume 13 - Economic Assessment of Road Schemes [Volume Withdrawn]
Volume 14 - Economic Assessment of Road Maintenance [Volume Withdrawn]
Volume 15 - Economic Assessment of Road Schemes in Scotland

The individual volumes contain technical requirements and guidance on a wide range of highway related topics, necessary to deliver works on the Strategic Road Network

== Specific subjects ==
=== Scheme appraisal ===
In terms of scheme appraisal, the cost-benefit and environmental impact assessment methods set out in DMRB provide important inputs into the approach used to appraise new road schemes, including the former New Approach to Appraisal.

=== Safety barriers (road restraint systems) ===
The approach to safety barriers was revised in 2005/06 from a prescriptive approach to a risk assessment-based system (Road Restraints Risk Assessment Process (RRRAP)). TD 19/06 – "Requirements for Road Restraint Systems" was issued and the safety barrier drawings in Volume 3 of the Manual of Contract Documents for Highways Works were withdrawn, to be replaced by Highways Agency accepted EN 1317 Road Restraint Systems list.

== Timeline ==
When the DMRB was originally published in 1992 it only covered roads in England and Wales. Its remit was subsequently extended to include roads in Scotland and Northern Ireland. DMRB is managed by National Highways on behalf of the agencies responsible for trunk roads in Scotland, Wales and Northern Ireland. However, the requirements given may be subject to national variations in the three devolved nations.

In 1992 it was published as loose leaf set of documents in lever arch files. In 2002 the DMRB was made freely available on the internet at. Paper copies in the lever arch folders continued to be available to purchase as well as copies available on compact discs.

=== 2015 review ===
In 2015 as part of the Protocol attached to the licence for Highways England Ltd to be the Strategic Highways Company, there was a requirement to review the structure, usability and content of the DMRB by March 2020. Highways England appointed WSP to assist with thought leadership on what these changes should be. Between April 2015 and March 2016 a wide ranging stakeholder consultation and developed a number of recommendations. The first of the new format documents were published in June 2018.

== Use in Republic of Ireland ==
Rather than create a separate design manual for roads in the Republic of Ireland, the UK's Design Manual for Roads and Bridges has also applied in the Republic of Ireland since 2001, with an additional addendum inserted by the National Roads Authority to cater for local conditions in the country. In this form it is known as the NRA Design Manual for Roads and Bridges or NRADMRB. The Irish version incorporates Volumes 1,2, 4–8 and part of Volume 9 of the UK DMRB.

== See also ==
- National Highways
- Roads in the United Kingdom
- Manual for Streets
