= Trunk road agent =

Type of road authority in Wales

Map of the two trunk road agents in Wales. North and Mid Wales Trunk Road Agent South Wales Trunk Road Agent

In Wales, a trunk road agent, (Welsh: asiant cefnffyrdd), is a partnership between two or more county and/or county borough councils for the purposes of managing, maintaining, and improving the network of trunk roads in Wales (including any motorways) in their respective areas on behalf of the Welsh Government.

== Agents ==
During 2005 to 2006 three trunk road agents were established to replace the previous eight, they were the North Wales Trunk Road Agent, the Mid Wales Trunk Road Agent and the South Wales Trunk Road Agent. On 1 April 2012 these were reduced still further to two:

- The North and Mid Wales Trunk Road Agent (NMWTRA; Welsh: Asiant Cefnffyrdd Gogledd a Chanolbarth Cymru), which covers the principal areas of Anglesey, Ceredigion, Conwy, Denbighshire, Flintshire, Gwynedd (lead authority), Powys, and Wrexham.
- The South Wales Trunk Road Agent (SWTRA; Welsh: Asiant Cefnffyrdd De Cymru), which covers the principal areas of Blaenau Gwent, Bridgend, Caerphilly, Cardiff, Carmarthenshire, Merthyr Tydfil, Monmouthshire, Neath Port Talbot (lead authority), Newport, Pembrokeshire, Rhondda Cynon Taf, Swansea, Torfaen, and the Vale of Glamorgan.

In 2026, Adam Price, the Cabinet Minister for Enterprise, Connectivity and Energy, announced that the two trunk road agents would be merged with Traffic Wales to form Highways Wales. The public sector model would be retained, as will Gwynedd Council and Neath Port Talbot County Borough Council being lead authorities. The plans would be fully revealed in January 2027.

== Traffic officers ==
Welsh Government traffic officers are civilian staff employed by the trunk road agents on behalf of the Welsh Government, as a means to ease traffic congestion on major trunk roads in Wales. Their role and powers are similar to their English counterparts working for National Highways, the National Highways traffic officers.
