= New Approach to Appraisal =

Framework for assessing transport projects and proposals in the United Kingdom

The New Approach to Appraisal (NATA) was the name given to a multi-criteria decision framework used to appraise transport projects and proposals in the United Kingdom. NATA was built on the well established cost–benefit analysis and environmental impact assessment techniques (such as those contained in the Highways Agency's Design Manual for Roads and Bridges (DMRB)) for assessing transport projects and proposals.

In April 2011 the Coalition Government decided that the term NATA would no longer be used. However, the principles and key elements of the NATA framework remain in the Department for Transport's Transport Analysis Guidance (TAG).

== History ==
NATA was introduced by the then Department for Transport, Environment and the Regions as part of the 1998 Integrated Transport White Paper and first used in the 1998 review of trunk road schemes. Its development reflected the new Labour Government's aim of providing a more balanced approach to transport appraisals, in terms of both:

- private transport versus public transport; and
- the economic impacts compared to environmental impacts.

Accompanying documents to that review list the ASTs for 68 trunk road schemes and provided initial guidance on how NATA was to be applied to transport projects.

A subsequent published study by academics at the Institute for Transport Studies (ITS), University of Leeds found that the decisions made by Ministers in respect of the road schemes were statistically significant in terms of how they related to the information about the schemes included on the ASTs. This demonstrated that Ministers were taking account of the information provided on the ASTs in a consistent way.

On 30 October 2007, the DfT published a consultation document – The NATA Refresh: Reviewing the New Approach to Appraisal – alongside, and as part of, its new transport strategy document 'Towards a sustainable transport system: Supporting economic growth in a low carbon economy'. The aim of the NATA Refresh consultation document is to seek views on how NATA should be developed.

== Aims ==
The methods for assessing the value for money of transport projects have been at the forefront of project appraisal practice in the UK for many years. NATA was designed to build on that good practice by bringing together the mass of detailed appraisal information about the impacts of a transport proposal, some of which are expressed in monetary terms, some using quantitative measures or some just in qualitative terms. A key aspect of NATA is the use of standard worksheets to collate the large amount of cost–benefit analysis and environmental impact assessment data and then present it in a more concise, consistent and balanced way.

Within the NATA framework, the impacts of transport projects are categorised in terms of five high level criteria (economy, safety, environment, accessibility and integration), reflecting the Government's objectives for transport. Each of these criteria are divided into a number of sub-criteria and it is against each of these sub-criteria that the impacts of a proposal are assessed and presented in a 1 page Appraisal Summary Table (AST).

The division of the five criteria is shown below:

- Economy (Public Accounts, Transport Economic Efficiency: Business Users & Transport Providers, Transport Economic Efficiency: Consumers, Reliability, Wider Economic Impacts)
- Safety (Accidents, Security)
- Environment (Noise, Local Air Quality, Greenhouse Gases, Landscape, Townscape, Heritage of Historic Resources, Biodiversity, Water Environment, Physical Fitness, Journey Ambience)
- Accessibility (Option values, Severance, Access to the Transport System)
- Integration (Transport Interchange, Land-Use Policy, Other Government Policies)

== Application ==
=== United Kingdom ===
The NATA framework is now a cornerstone of UK transport appraisal practice. It has been applied to other types of road proposals, including small Highways Agency projects and local authority road schemes and to other modes of transport, including the major programme of Multi-Modal Studies, initiated by the Government, that were carried out between 1999 and 2003, Local Transport Plan major public transport schemes, as well as rail proposals. In 2003, a web based set of Transport Analysis Guidance (commonly referred to as WebTAG) based on NATA principles, was launched by the Department for Transport (DfT).

A further development of NATA has been its use of an approach that disaggregates impacts between all those who are affected by a proposal, rather than the traditional cost–benefit approach of simply assessing the net impacts on society. While the two approaches are equivalent at the aggregate level, the NATA approach allows a more detailed analysis to be made of those who gain and those who lose as a result of a proposal. However the NATA approach raises issues regarding the precise definition of the impacts that are included in the numerator and denominator of the Benefit-Cost Ratio.

As well as setting out methods for appraising transport proposals, WebTAG contains values that should be used to assess different types of impacts, including the value of time and vehicle operating costs.

A UK Government Multi-Criteria Analysis (MCA) manual, originally produced by the former Department for Transport, Local Government and the Regions and now overseen by the Department for Communities and Local Government, highlights NATA as an example of MCA being applied in practice to a major area of UK Government policy.

=== Scotland, Wales and Northern Ireland ===
For those transport matters that are the responsibilities of the Scottish Executive, Welsh Assembly Government and Northern Ireland Assembly, the NATA principles have been adopted by the relevant transport authorities in those countries. Transport Scotland has issued its own transport appraisal guidance, 'Scot-TAG' (Scottish Transport Appraisal Guidance), which draws heavily on NATA. In Summer 2006 the Welsh Assembly Government consulted on the development of its NATA-based transport appraisal guidance, WelTAG, and published its guidance in June 2008. The appraisal procedure used by the Roads Service in Northern Ireland's Department for Regional Development is based on the five NATA criteria.

=== World Bank ===
A transport project evaluation toolkit prepared in 2003 for the World Bank and a series of Economic Evaluation Notes prepared for Bank staff in 2005 drew heavily on many elements within the NATA framework.
