= Key worker =

Occupation prioritized by state policy

A key worker is a worker in an occupation given preferential treatment by government policy. They may be exempted from rules which apply to the general population or prioritized for the receipt of benefits.

== Reasons for preferential treatment ==
=== Societal functioning during public health emergencies ===
A key worker is a public-sector or private-sector employee who is considered to provide an essential service. The term was also used by the UK government during announcements regarding school shutdowns invoked in response to the COVID-19 pandemic to indicate parents whose occupations entitled them to continue sending their children to schools which were otherwise shut down by government policy, as well as teachers and LSAs at those schools.

A key worker is a public sector or private sector employee who is considered to provide an "essential service".

==== Key workers' jobs that cannot be done remotely ====
- Healthcare. Skilled workers in the healthcare field, such as physicians, nurses, lab personnel, and ancillary staff are necessary for the continued functioning of the medical system.
- Energy. Many of the jobs in this field, which includes mining and oil extraction, cannot be done remotely.
- First responders. These are the people communities depend on in emergencies, such as paramedics, firefighters and police.
- Education and child care. Making sure children can grow academically even during a pandemic means vaccinating teachers, their support staff, and daycare employees.
- Agriculture and food production. Many of the outbreaks at the onset of the pandemic were in meatpacking facilities and other food-processing plants.
- Critical retail. (i.e. grocery stores, hardware stores, auto mechanics etc.). Keeping supermarket employees safe makes it possible for others to stay fed while restaurants are temporarily shut down.
- Critical trades. (i.e. construction workers, electricians, plumbers, etc.)
- Manufacturing. These jobs (producing goods) cannot be done remotely.
- Prison workers. Prisons are the types of closed facilities where the coronavirus can spread quickly.
- Postal workers. This group makes sure vital packages get delivered, along with providing other key services.
- Public transit workers. These are the people who make it possible for other essential workers to get to their jobs.(e.g transportation systems)

==== Key workers' jobs that may be done remotely ====
- Transportation and logistics. These are the workers who ensure that stores’ shelves remain stocked and other key supplies get where they're needed.
- Food service. States decide which facilities and restaurants are big enough for their employees to get vaccinated in this group.
- Shelter and housing. These are the construction workers and contractors responsible for the construction and repair of houses and other buildings.
- Architects and designers. Responsible for designing buildings and fixtures for both the public administration and the private sector.
- Finance. Families need financial advisers to help them navigate the recession that has accompanied the COVID-19 pandemic.
- Information technology and communication. Videoconferencing and other internet technologies have become a lifeline for many families and businesses during 2020.
- Media. Making sure the public is accurately informed is vital during this public health crisis.
- Legal. While demand for legal services has declined significantly in 2020, these professionals remain essential for many proceedings.
- Engineers. Workers in these occupations play a major public safety role by guaranteeing that projects meet the appropriate standards and guidelines.
- Water and wastewater. Keeping the water supply safe means being able to keep these professionals on the job.

==== COVID-19 pandemic ====
During the COVID-19 pandemic, UK schools were closed except for children of "key workers" defined by the government. To obtain a school place, at least one parent had to be a key worker.

Work was not restricted to key workers: other workers could still go to work if they could not work from home.

The UK government on 19 March 2020 defined which groups of staff are considered Key Workers or Critical Workers for schooling purposes, with the following definitions:

- Health and social care. This includes but is not limited to doctors, nurses, midwives, paramedics, pharmacists, social workers, care workers, and other frontline health and social care staff including volunteers; the support and specialist staff required to maintain the UK's health and social care sector; those working as part of the health and social care supply chain, including producers and distributors of medicines and medical and personal protective equipment.
- Education and childcare. This includes childcare, support and teaching staff, social workers and those specialist education professionals who must remain active during the COVID-19 response to deliver this approach.
- Key public services. This includes those essential to the running of the justice system, religious staff, charities and workers delivering key frontline services, those responsible for the management of the deceased, and journalists and broadcasters who are providing public service broadcasting.
- Local and national government. This only includes those administrative occupations essential to the effective delivery of the COVID-19 response, or delivering essential public services, such as the payment of benefits, including in government agencies and arm's-length bodies.
- Food and other necessary goods. This includes those involved in food production, processing, distribution, sale and delivery, as well as those essential to the provision of other key goods (for example hygienic and veterinary medicines). This also includes cleaners in supermarkets.
- Public safety and national security. This includes police and support staff, Ministry of Defence civilians, contractor and armed forces personnel (those critical to the delivery of key defence and national security outputs and essential to the response to the COVID-19 pandemic), fire and rescue service employees (including support staff), National Crime Agency staff, those maintaining border security, prison and probation staff and other national security roles, including those overseas.
- Transport. This includes those who will keep the air, water, road and rail passenger and freight transport modes operating during the COVID-19 response, including those working on transport systems through which supply chains pass.
- Utilities, communication and financial services. This includes staff needed for essential financial services provision (including but not limited to workers in banks, building societies and financial market infrastructure), the oil, gas, electricity and water sectors (including sewerage), information technology and data infrastructure sector and primary industry supplies to continue during the COVID-19 response, as well as key staff working in the civil nuclear, chemicals, telecommunications (including but not limited to network operations, field engineering, call centre staff, IT and data infrastructure, 999 and 111 critical services), postal services and delivery, payments providers and waste disposal sectors.

=== Military need ===
During the Second World War in Germany, professionals who were indispensable to carry out a military, transport or administrative defence task could be freed from military service in the German Wehrmacht. They could be granted status as a key worker ("Schlüsselkraft") per § 5 Abs. 2 WehrGesetz. The term is still in use if reservists of the German Army (Bundeswehr) cannot attend military exercises, for example.

=== Occupations having difficulty attracting and retaining workers ===
==== United Kingdom housing policies ====
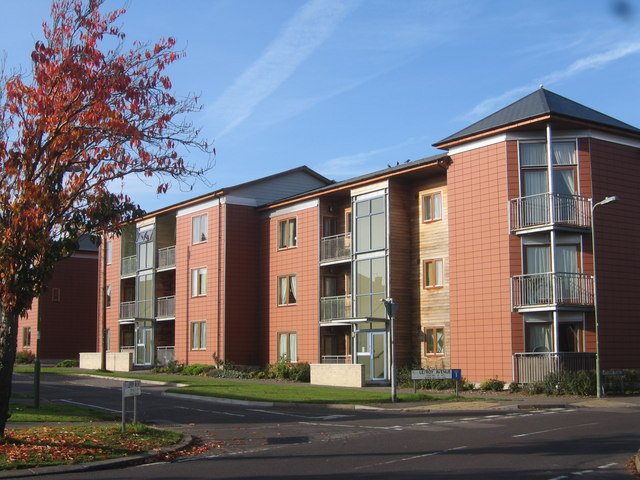
Dedicated key worker housing in Basingstoke, England, built in 2005/06

The term has been used in the United Kingdom in the context of workers who may find it difficult to buy property in the area where they work. As of 2005, use of the term had become more prominent in the UK as escalating house prices resulted in a gap between household income and the cost of housing. Many local authorities and other public sector bodies, especially in London and the South East, where a "Key worker living scheme" operates have been facing major problems recruiting and retaining their workers many of whom are on lower levels of pay than the private sector in terms of housing in most cases the social rented sector is unable to provide low cost housing for rent or shared ownership. In response initiatives have been designed to house key workers, including low-cost loans and shared ownership schemes.

The key worker living programme defined key workers to include:

- Clinical National Health Service staff including doctors and dentists
- Teachers and nursery nurses
- Police officers, police community support officers and some civilian police staff
- Prison officers and some other prison staff
- Probation Service staff
- Social workers, educational psychologists, and therapists
- Local authority planners
- Firefighters, fire safety engineers
- Connexions personal advisers
- Some Ministry of Defence personnel
- Environmental health officers
- National Highways traffic officers
- Railway workers [Network Rail] freight and passenger trains

The definition can be extended to include those support staff without whom the above roles may struggle to function.

==== Immigration ====
While Austria does not define the term key worker itself, it implies it is a skilled worker from a long and annually adjusted list of "shortage occupations". It defines self employed key worker, as someone whose self-employed "occupation creates macroeconomic benefit going beyond its own operational benefit in Austria".

== See also ==
- Critical infrastructure – Infrastructure important to national security
