= A487 road =

Trunk road in Wales

A487

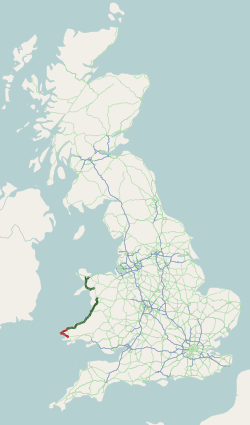

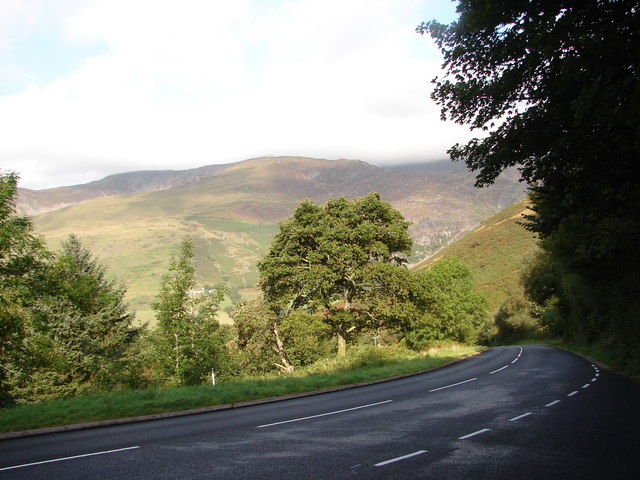
- Between Machynlleth and Dolgellau with Cadair Idris in view

Route information
- Maintained by South Wales Trunk Road Agent and North & Mid Wales Trunk Road Agent
- Length: 174 mi (280 km)

Major junctions
- South end: Haverfordwest; 51.7926°N 4.9789°W
- A4076; A40 A478 A484; A486 A482 A485 A4120; A44 A4159 A489 A493 A470 A494 A493 A496 A4212 A496 A4085 A498 A499 A4085 A4086 A4087; A55; A5
- North end: Bangor; 53.2187°N 4.1601°W

Location
- Country: United Kingdom
- Primary destinations: Fishguard; Cardigan; Aberystwyth; Machynlleth; Porthmadog; Caernarfon

Road network
- Roads in the United Kingdom; Motorways; A and B road zones

The A487, officially the Fishguard to Bangor Trunk Road, is a trunk road in Wales that follows the coast from Haverfordwest, Pembrokeshire, in the south, to Bangor, Gwynedd, in the north.

== Route ==
The road starts at a junction with the A40 in Haverfordwest and travels northwest to St David's to switch northeast through Fishguard, Cardigan, Aberaeron, Aberystwyth, Machynlleth and Corris.

Through the town of Fishguard, the road width in places is a very narrow single lane, leading to many traffic issues, especially with heavy goods vehicles (HGVs). From 2010, articulated HGVs were diverted from the section between Cardigan and Fishguard because of this, and routed instead via the A478 road to Penblewin, then the A40 to Fishguard via Haverfordwest. However, there were still problems to some extent.

The road continues to Dolgellau multiplexing with the A470 north of the Cross Foxes inn. After Dolgellau, the road continues to multiplex with the A470, re-emerging just north of Trawsfynydd then passing through Penrhyndeudraeth and Porthmadog. The road terminates where it meets the Menai Suspension Bridge near Bangor.

== History ==
The section of road in the Dulas valley between the River Dyfi near Machynlleth and Corris was built in the 1840s at the instigation of the local slate quarry owners to replace the old turnpike road on the opposite side of the valley. It may have utilised part of the formation of the Roman Sarn Helen. From 1859, the narrow-gauge Corris Railway followed the same route.

The site of Dolgellau railway station, along with approximately 1.5 mi (2.4 km) of trackbed of the Ruabon–Barmouth line, was used to construct the Dolgellau bypass in the late 1970s.

In 1989–90, Cardigan was bypassed south of the town with a new Priory Bridge over the River Teifi and a short 3-lane section between the bridge and the junction with the A478.

A bypass was opened in 1994 avoiding Y Felinheli on the section between Caernarfon and Bangor.

Between Penrhyndeudraeth and Porthmadog, the road passed over a mile-long embankment, known as The Cob. Until 2003, drivers had to pay a charge to cross The Cob. In 2009, the Welsh Assembly Government published a compulsory purchase order to construct the Porthmadog, Minffordd and Tremadog bypass, which would reduce the amount of through traffic in the town. Work started on the project in 2010, the route of which passes under the Ffestiniog Railway, and then crosses over the Welsh Highland Railway. The original route over The Cob was renumbered as the A4971. The Porthmadog bypass was officially opened on 17 October 2011.

The section between Porthmadog and Llanwnda has been improved. The new section bypasses Llanllyfni and Penygroes, in parts utilizing the old trackbed of the Caernarfon to Afon Wen railway line. In April 2007, the 10 mi (16 km) new section had to be resurfaced in its entirety after it became apparent that the wrong type of stone had been used for the surface tarmac.

A bat bridge was built over the Groeslon bypass in 2010 to guide lesser horseshoe bats across the road.

The preferred route for the £100m Caernarfon-Bontnewydd bypass had been announced; Caernarfon from the northern end of the Pen-y-groes bypass to the western end of the Y Felinheli bypass. This bypass was under construction in 2021 and opened 19 February 2022.

In 2018, Pembrokeshire County Council proposed to build a bypass to the east of Newgale which would replace the road section which was flooded during the 2013–14 United Kingdom winter floods.

== See also ==
- Trunk roads in Wales
- Pont ar Dyfi
