= Welsh Government traffic officer =

Road transport occupation in Wales

Welsh Government traffic officer Swyddog Traffig y Llywodraeth Cymru (Welsh)
Occupation
- Activity sectors: Government, road traffic control, vehicle recovery, roadside assistance

Description
- Fields of employment: Motorways and select trunk roads in Wales operated by Trunk road agents.
- Related jobs: Road policing unit, Traffic guard

Logo used by Welsh Government Traffic Officers

Welsh Government traffic officers (Welsh: Swyddog Traffig y Llywodraeth Cymru) are civilian staff employed by the trunk road agents on behalf of the Welsh Government as a means to ease traffic congestion on major trunk roads in Wales. Their role and powers are similar to their English counterparts working for National Highways, the National Highways traffic officers.

== History ==
They were initially established in order to assist police officers from Gwent Police and South Wales Police by removing part of their workload with regards to breakdowns and collisions.

== Powers ==
In addition to a number of exemptions from the Road Traffic Act and Motorway Regulations (such as stopping on the hard shoulder, driving/reversing on the hard shoulder), traffic officers derive powers from the Traffic Management Act 2004.

Officers must follow the directions of a police constable, and to exercise their powers, must be on duty and in uniform.

For the purposes of:

- maintaining or improving the movement of traffic on a relevant road over which the traffic officer has jurisdiction
- preventing or reducing the effect of anything causing (or which has the potential to cause) congestion or other disruption to the movement of traffic on such a road,
- avoiding danger to persons or other traffic using such a road (or preventing risks of any such danger arising),
- preventing damage to, or to anything on or near, such a road,

a traffic officer may:

- direct a person driving or propelling a vehicle to stop the vehicle, or to make it proceed in, or keep to, a particular line of traffic,
- for the purposes of a traffic survey of any description which is being carried out on or in the vicinity of a road, to direct a person driving or propelling a vehicle to stop the vehicle, or to make it proceed in, or keep to, a particular line of traffic, or to proceed to a particular point on or near the road on which the vehicle is being driven or propelled (subject to the restriction in section 35(3) of the Road Traffic Act 1988 (c. 52)),
- to direct persons on foot (or such persons and other traffic) to stop,
- to direct a person driving a mechanically propelled vehicle, or riding a cycle, on a road to stop the vehicle or cycle,
- to place temporary traffic signs and cones on a road.

Assaulting, resisting or willfully obstructing a traffic officer are offences. It is also an offence to impersonate a traffic officer, or for a traffic officer to claim to have more powers than they do. Traffic officers do not have any powers of arrest, nor do they have the power to search, issue fixed penalties or report for summons for any motoring offence. Traffic officers are not exempt from any traffic laws, and must, at all times, comply with the posted speed limits and all red traffic lights.

Drivers are obliged by the Traffic Management Act 2004 to comply with the directions given by traffic officers. This is briefly explained in the Highway Code:

Traffic Officers have powers to stop vehicles on most motorways and some 'A' class roads. If traffic officers in uniform want to stop your vehicle on safety grounds (e.g. an insecure load) they will, where possible, attract your attention by

- flashing amber lights, usually from behind
- directing you to pull over to the side by pointing and/or using the left indicator

You MUST then pull over and stop as soon as it is safe to do so. Then switch off your engine. It is an offence not to comply with their directions.

— Rule 108, Highway Code

== See also ==
- National Highways traffic officers
