= North and Mid Wales Trunk Road Agent =

Trunk road agent in Wales

- Native name: Asiant Cefnffyrdd Gogledd a Chanolbarth Cymru (Welsh)
- Type: Welsh Government agency
- Industry: Trunk road agent (Highway authority)
- Predecessors: North Wales Trunk Road Agency; Mid Wales Trunk Road Agency
- Founded: 1 April 2012
- Headquarters: Llys Britannia; Parc Menai; Bangor
- Areas served: North Wales: Conwy County Borough; Denbighshire; Flintshire; Gwynedd (lead); Isle of Anglesey; Wrexham County Borough; Mid Wales: Ceredigion; Powys
- Key people: Mark MacNamara (Head of Service)
- Owner: Welsh Government
- Website: traffic.wales/north-and-mid-wales-trunk-road-agent-nmwtra

Map of the trunk road agent's coverage.

The North and Mid Wales Trunk Road Agent (NMWTRA; Welsh: Asiant Cefnffyrdd Gogledd a Chanolbarth Cymru) is one of the two trunk road agents in Wales. It is responsible for managing trunk roads in North and Mid Wales on behalf of the Welsh Government. A merger of two trunk road agencies, established separately on 1 April 2006, the North Wales Trunk Road Agency and Mid Wales Trunk Road Agency, the two bodies were merged and renamed to its current name on 1 April 2012. The agent manages trunk roads in eight principal areas of the north and mid regions of Wales: the respective principal councils of Anglesey, Ceredigion, Conwy, Denbighshire, Flintshire, Gwynedd (lead authority), Powys, and Wrexham. The remainder of Wales is managed by the South Wales Trunk Road Agent.

== History ==
Prior to the North Wales Trunk Road Agency and Mid Wales Trunk Road Agency being established, motorways and trunk roads in Wales were managed by the Ministry of Transport, later being taken on by the Welsh Office. The National Assembly for Wales took responsibility for devolved powers on 1 July 1999, as part of this process, transport was transferred from the Parliament of the United Kingdom to the National Assembly for Wales and with it responsibility for the trunk road network, including motorways. Responsibility for the management of highways in Wales is split between the Welsh Government and local highway agencies. The Welsh Government is responsible for trunk roads and motorways, whilst the 22 local authorities are responsible for all other highways.

In 2001 the Welsh Government reviewed the way in which trunk roads and motorways were being managed, and by September 2004, they had decided to reduce the number of trunk road agencies from eight down to three. The three new agencies including the South Wales Trunk Road Agency (SWTRA), North Wales Trunk Road Agency (NWTRA) and Mid Wales Trunk Road Agency (MWTRA). Both the North Wales Trunk Road Agency and Mid Wales Trunk Road Agency was established on 1 April 2006, and by 1 April 2012 the two bodies merged and were renamed to become the North and Mid Wales Trunk Road Agent. The North and Mid Wales Trunk Road Agent is responsible for the trunk roads in 8 Local Authorities, on behalf of Isle of Anglesey County Council, Ceredigion County Council, Conwy County Borough Council, Denbighshire County Council, Flintshire County Council, Gwynedd Council, Powys County Council, and Wrexham County Borough Council. Gwynedd Council acts as the Lead Authority for NMWTRA is managed through the Trunk Road Management Unit (TRMU) who manage and maintains the trunk road network on behalf of the Welsh Government.

As of April 2015, out of a total of 34,495 kilometres (21,434 mi) of roads in Wales, 1,576 kilometres (979 mi) are trunk roads. Of the 980 miles (1,576 km) of trunk roads in Wales, the NMWTRA manages 1,100 kilometres (680 mi) of which 175 kilometres (109 mi) is dual carriageway.

In 2026, the Welsh Government announced that the NMWTRA would be merged with the South Wales Trunk Road Agent and Traffic Wales, to form Highways Wales.

== Roads managed ==
Road number	Route within Wales (under NMWTRA)
A5	Bangor - Chirk
A40	Abergavenny - Llandovery
A44	Llangurig - Aberystwyth
A55	Holyhead - Cheshire border
A458	Shropshire border - Mallwyd
A470	Merthyr Tydfil - Llandudno Junction
A479	Nantyffin - Llyswen
A483	Cheshire border - Sugar Loaf
A487	Dinas (Ceredigion) - Bangor
A489	Newtown - Machynlleth
A494	Dolgellau - Queensferry

== See also ==
- Trunk roads in Wales
- Highways in England and Wales
- Trunk road
- Trunk road agent
- South Wales Trunk Road Agent
- Roads in the United Kingdom
- Welsh Government Traffic Officer
