= Manual for Streets =

In England and Wales, the Manual for Streets, published in March 2007, provides guidance for practitioners involved in the planning, design, provision and approval of new streets, and modifications to existing ones. It aims to increase the quality of life through good design which creates more people-oriented streets. Although the detailed guidance in the document applies mainly to residential streets, the overall design principles apply to all streets within urban areas.

A street is defined as "a highway with important public realm functions beyond the movement of motor traffic" – i.e. by its function rather than some arbitrary traffic flow limit.

== Overview ==
The UK Department for Transport (DfT) and the Department for Communities and Local Government (DCLG), with support from the Commission for Architecture and the Built Environment (CABE), commissioned WSP Group, Transport Research Laboratory (TRL), Llewelyn Davies Yeang and Phil Jones Associates to develop Manual for Streets to give guidance to a range of practitioners on effective street design.

Manual for Streets was published on 29 March 2007. It superseded Design Bulletin 32 – Residential Roads and Footpaths – Layout Considerations (DB32) and the companion guide Places, Streets and Movement, which have now been withdrawn. A copy of the manual as well a summary and supporting research can be downloaded from the Department for Transport.

Manual for Streets has updated geometric guidelines for low trafficked residential streets, examines the effect of the environment on road user behaviour, and draws on practice in other countries. Research undertaken by TRL provides the evidence base upon which the revised geometric guidelines in the Manual for Streets are based, including link widths, forward visibility, visibility splays and junction spacing.

Manual for Streets applies in England and Wales and is national guidance, not a policy document.

The Scottish Government commissioned WSP Group, Phil Jones Associates and Edaw to produce Designing Streets, a version of Manual for Streets for application in Scotland and was published in 2010. Unlike Manual for Streets, it is published as a "policy statement".

== MfS 2 ==
Manual for Streets 2: Wider Application of the Principles was launched on 29 September 2010 in London. It is designed to be read alongside the original Manual rather than to supersede it. It is available to buy for £40 in paper form from its publisher, the Chartered Institution of Highways & Transportation (CIHT), as well as the usual retail outlets. CIHT staff reported at the launch that it will not be available to download for up to a year.

== Criticisms ==
Manual for Streets has been criticised for its approach to permeability of street networks. Critics argue that, by encouraging permeability of street networks for motor vehicles, MfS undermines its declared intention to reduce the domination of streets by motor traffic. Sustrans, the sustainable transport charity, while giving a cautious welcome to the Manual, argues that the guidance should limit permeability for motor vehicles and provide full permeability for walking and cycling. Melia (2008) went further, arguing:

"By multiplying opportunities for ‘rat-running' [the approach in Manual for Streets will] increase the capacity of a road network to carry traffic – and, course (sic) to emit CO_{2}. In other words, it is a cheaper variation on the 'build our way out of congestion' theme."

== See also ==
- The Design Manual for Roads and Bridges
