= Benefit–cost ratio =

Indicator of value-for-money of a project or proposal

A benefit–cost ratio (BCR) is an indicator, used in cost–benefit analysis, that attempts to summarize the overall value for money of a project or proposal. A BCR is the ratio of the benefits of a project or proposal, expressed in monetary terms, relative to its costs, also expressed in monetary terms. All benefits and costs should be expressed in discounted present values. A BCR can be a profitability index in for-profit contexts. A BCR takes into account the amount of monetary gain realized by performing a project versus the amount it costs to execute the project. The higher the BCR the better the investment. The general rule of thumb is that if the benefit is higher than the cost the project is a good investment.

The practice of cost–benefit analysis in some countries refers to the BCR as the cost–benefit ratio, but this is still calculated as the ratio of benefits to costs.

== Rationale ==
In the absence of funding constraints, the best value for money projects are those with the highest net present value (NPV). Where there is a budget constraint, the ratio of NPV to the expenditure falling within the constraint should be used. In practice, the ratio of present value (PV) of future net benefits to expenditure is expressed as a BCR. (NPV-to-investment is net BCR.) BCRs have been used most extensively in the field of transport cost–benefit appraisals. The NPV should be evaluated over the service life of the project.

== Problems ==
Long-term BCRs, such as those involved in climate change, are very sensitive to the discount rate used in the calculation of net present value, and there is often no consensus on the appropriate rate to use.

The handling of non-monetary impacts also presents problems. These impacts are usually incorporated by estimating them in monetary terms, using measures such as WTP (willingness to pay), though these are often difficult to assess. Alternative approaches include the UK's New Approach to Appraisal framework.

A further complication with BCRs concerns the precise definitions of benefits and costs. These can vary depending on the funding agency.

== Calculation ==
$$BCR = \frac{\text{Discounted value of incremental benefits}}{\text{Discounted value of incremental costs}}$$

== See also ==
- Benefit shortfall
- Cost–benefit analysis
- Cost overrun
- Efficiency ratio
- Price–performance ratio
