= Aberdesach =

Coordinates: 53.036°N 4.348°W

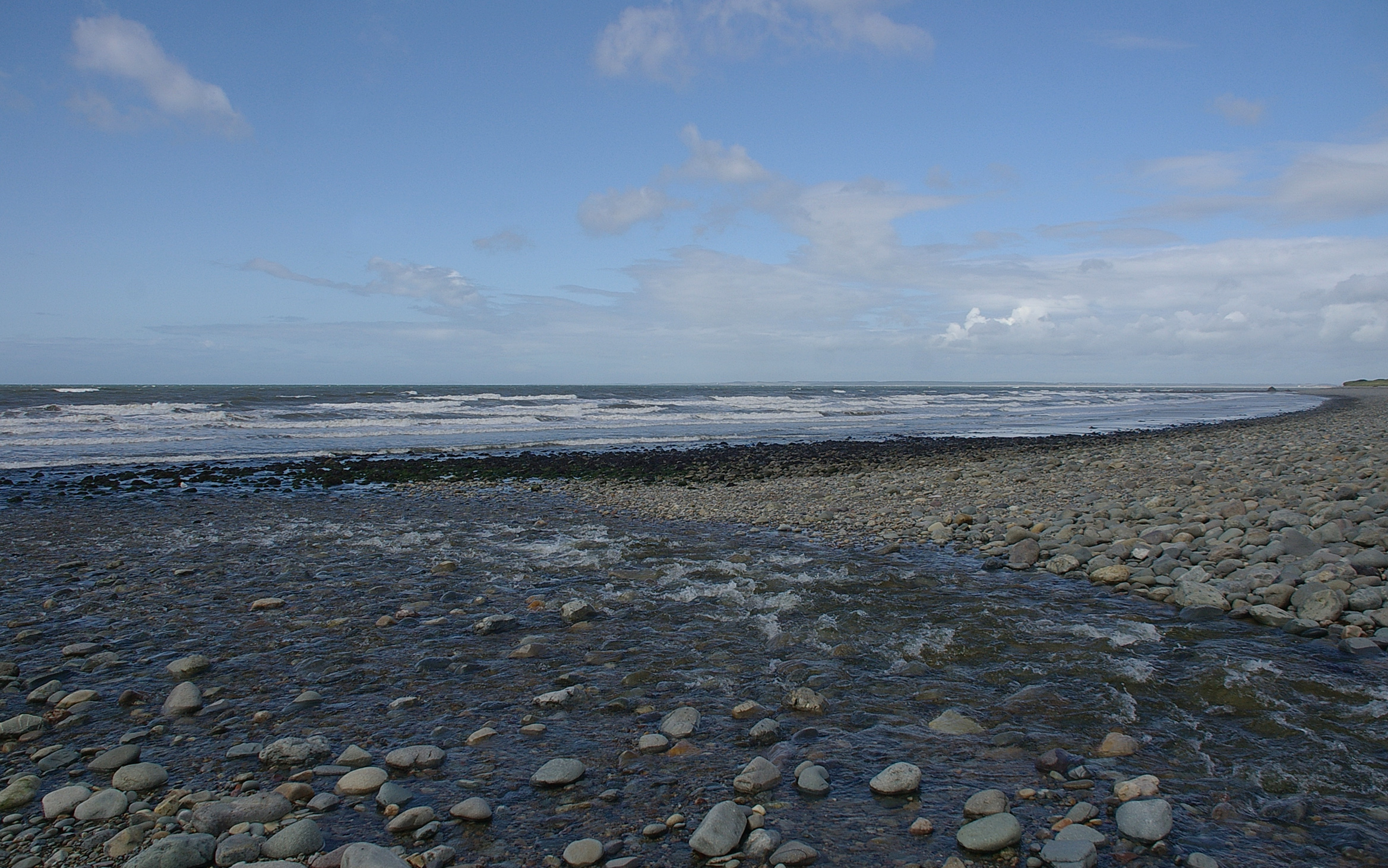
- Looking out to sea from the beach at Aberdesach

- Location within Gwynedd
- OS grid reference: SH425514
- Community: Clynnog
- Principal area: Gwynedd
- Country: Wales
- Sovereign state: United Kingdom
- Post town: CAERNARFON
- Postcode district: LL54
- Dialling code: 01286
- Police: North Wales
- Fire: North Wales
- Ambulance: Welsh
- UK Parliament: Dwyfor Meirionnydd
- Senedd Cymru – Welsh Parliament: Gwynedd Maldwyn

Aberdesach is a small village in a primarily Welsh speaking area of Gwynedd. It is in the historic county of Caernarfonshire. The village is situated approximately 1.5 miles south of the neighbouring village of Pontllyfni and 6 miles south of the county town of Caernarfon.

== History ==
The village has a history of farming, as a coal landing site, and has connections to the slate industry. Aberdesach is home to one of the surviving plotlands communities.
