= National Highways =

Highway authority in England

National Highways Limited

- Headquarters in Guildford, Surrey
- Formerly: Highways England (April 2015 – August 2021); Highways Agency (March 1994 – March 2015)
- Type: Government-owned company
- Industry: Highway authority
- Founded: 1 April 2015
- Headquarters: Guildford, Surrey
- Area served: England; United Kingdom (road standards only)
- Key people: Nick Joyce (Interim CEO); Sir Gareth Rhys Williams (chairman)
- Owner: HM Government
- Number of employees: 6,000 (2024)
- Website: nationalhighways.co.uk

- Applies to: England
- Relates to: Roads

Other UK counterparts
- Northern Ireland: Department for Infrastructure Roads
- Scotland: Transport Scotland
- Wales: North & Mid Wales TRA; South Wales TRA; Transport for Wales

National Highways (NH), formerly Highways England and before that the Highways Agency, is a government-owned company charged with operating, maintaining and improving motorways and major A roads in England.

It sets highways standards used by all four UK administrations, through the Design Manual for Roads and Bridges. Within England, it operates information services through the provision of on-road signage and a dedicated page of its website, provides traffic officers to deal with incidents on its network, and manages the delivery of improvement schemes to the network.

Founded as an executive agency, it was converted into a government-owned company, Highways England, in April 2015. As part of this transition, the UK government set out its vision for the future of the English strategic road network in its Road Investment Strategy. A second Road Investment Strategy was published in March 2020, with the company set to invest £27 billion between 2020 and 2025 to improve the network as described in the strategy. The current name was adopted in August 2021.

== History ==
=== Highways Agency ===
The former logo of the Highways Agency, 1994–2015

In March 1994, the Highways Agency was created as an executive agency of the Department for Transport.

As part of the Department for Transport's 2010 Spending Review settlement, Alan Cook was appointed to lead an independent review of the government's approach to the strategic road network. It recognised that the Highways Agency was closer to central government than other infrastructure operators, resulting in a lack of a strategic vision and certainty of funding due to the wider policy environment in which it operated, as well as the limited pressure to drive efficiencies compared to that faced by regulated sectors.

=== Highways England ===
The former logo of Highways England, 2015–2021

In April 2015, it became a government-owned company with the name Highways England. In July 2015, Jim O'Sullivan became chief executive, replacing Graham Dalton.

In 2020, the agency launched an advertising campaign using the song "Go West" by Village People and covered by Pet Shop Boys. The lyrics changed to "Go Left", encouraging people to stop on the left hand side of the motorway in case of breakdown.

=== National Highways ===
In August 2021, Highways England was rebranded to National Highways, removing any reference to England from its name. This move coincided with the permanent appointment of Nick Harris as CEO, after taking over as interim CEO from Jim O’Sullivan in February 2021.

It was suggested that the 'national' in the new name refers to the fact that the company is responsible for setting highways standards for the whole of the UK, through the Design Manual for Roads and Bridges, even though decisions on the building and maintenance of roads outside of England are devolved to the Scottish Government, Welsh Government and Northern Ireland Executive.

The renaming met with some criticism, being the third name for the agency in six years, and with reports that 'Highways Agency' is colloquially used more than either newer name. The name has also attracted criticism from the other countries of the UK, particularly in Wales where the use of 'national' has been criticised despite transport being devolved to Wales.

== Responsibilities ==
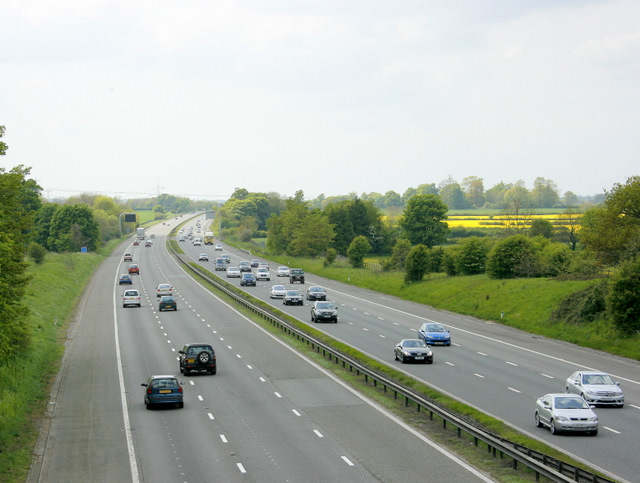
The M4 motorway is partly managed by National Highways.

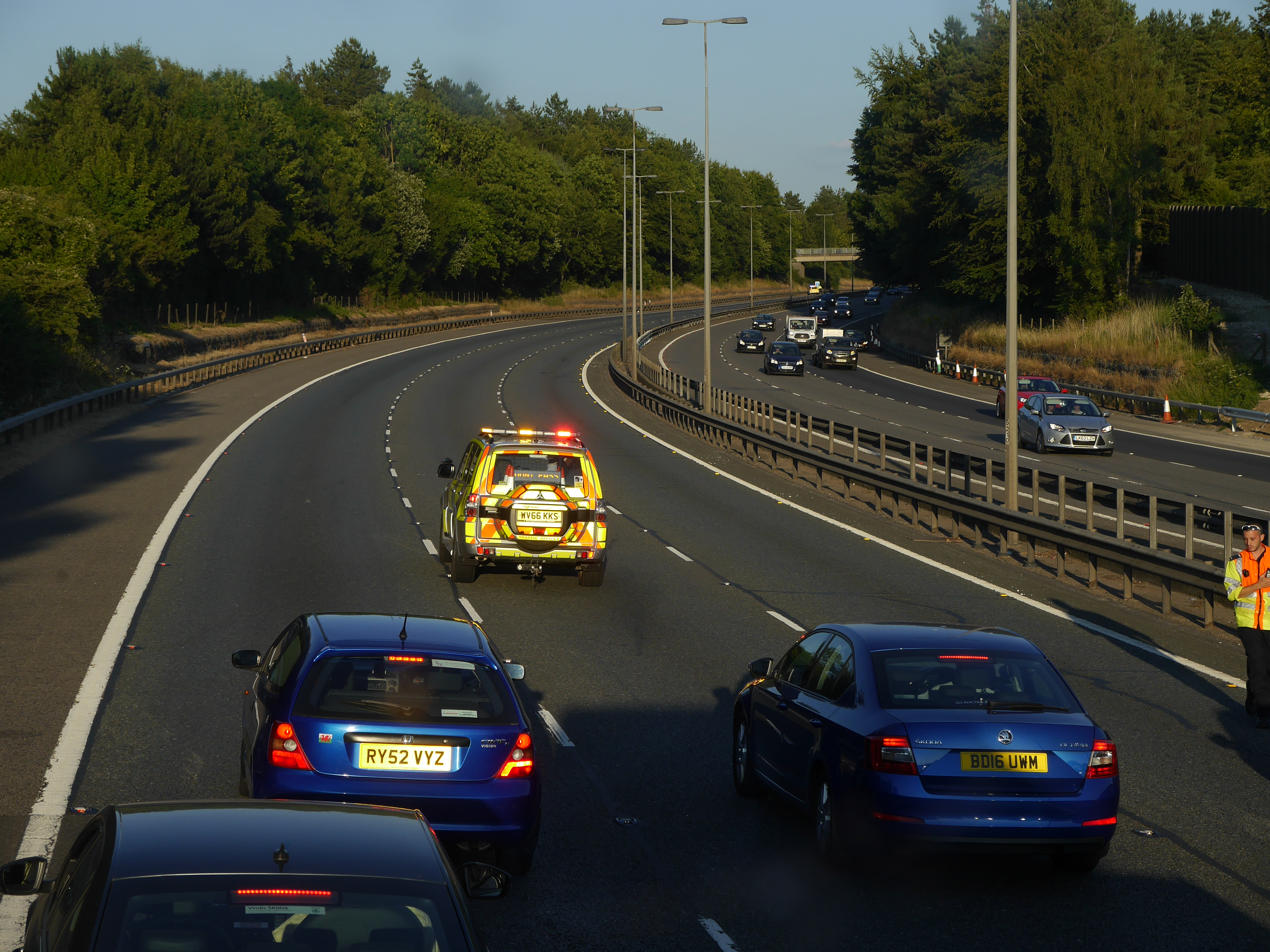
A NH traffic officer carries out a road block on the M40 motorway in 2018

National Highways is responsible for operating, maintaining and improving the strategic road network (SRN) – the motorways and major A roads in England. The SRN comprises over 4,000 miles (6,400 km) of road and includes structures such as bridges, tunnels, drainage systems and technology assets including variable message signs and cabling. The SRN includes only around 2% of the total road length in England, but it carries around a third of all its motor vehicle traffic.

National Highways is responsible for the Design Manual for Roads and Bridges (DMRB) providing the standards, advice notes and other documents relating to the design, assessment and operation of trunk roads, including motorways in the United Kingdom. The manual is produced by National Highways in conjunction with the devolved governments of Wales, Scotland and Northern Ireland. The manual is also used in some parts of the Commonwealth.

The authority produces the Manual of Contract Documents for Highway Works (MCHW), and Asset Maintenance and Operation Requirements (AMOR) which supersedes the Network Maintenance Manual and Routine and Winter Service Codes, and its predecessor the Trunk Road Maintenance Manual. Contractors and subcontractors are generally paid via a project bank account, which is the agency's default mechanism for ensuring that payments flow down through the supply chain, and prevent payment hold-ups for sub-contractors undertaking work on behalf of a prime contractor.

=== Operating the network ===
National Highways' operations are split into areas which are loosely based on the regions of England. These regions are subdivided into nine operational areas. Eleven areas and routes are managed by DBFO (Design-Build-Finance-Operate) companies. Each area is managed and maintained by an area team, with a Managing Agent, MA, and a contractor, the Managing Agent Contractor, MAC. The M6 Toll is a PFI concession, which is part of the strategic road network.

=== Strategic Road Network ===
Strategic Road Network
| Operational area | Counties covered (whole and partial) | Roads managed |
|---|---|---|
| South West (former areas 1 & 2) | Bristol, Cornwall, Devon, Gloucestershire, Somerset, Wiltshire | M4, M5, M32, M48, M49, A4, A30, A36, A38, A40, A46, A303 |
| Area 3 | Berkshire, Buckinghamshire, Dorset, Hampshire, Oxfordshire, Surrey, Wiltshire | M3, M4, M27, M271, A3(M), A308(M), A404(M), A3, A27, A31, A34, A303, A404 |
| Area 4 | East Sussex, Kent, Surrey, West Sussex | M2, M20, M23, A2, A20, A21, A23, A26, A27, A259, A2070 |
| East (former areas 6 & 8) | Bedfordshire, Buckinghamshire, Cambridgeshire, Essex, Hertfordshire, Norfolk, Suffolk | M1, M11, A1(M) , A1, A5, A11, A12, A14, A47, A120, A141, A414, A421, A428, A1307 |
| Area 7 | Derbyshire, Leicestershire, Lincolnshire, Nottinghamshire, Northamptonshire, Rutland | M1, M6, M45, M69, A1, A5, A6, A14, A38, A42, A43, A45, A46, A50, A52, A453, A516, A5111 |
| Area 9 | Gloucestershire, Herefordshire, Shropshire, Staffordshire, Warwickshire, West Midlands, Worcestershire | M5, M6, M40, M42, M50, M54, M69, A5, A38, A40, A45, A46, A49, A50, A446, A449, A458, A483, A500, A4510, A5148 |
| North West (former areas 10 & 13) | Cheshire, Cumbria, Greater Manchester, Lancashire, Merseyside | M6, M53, M55, M56, M57, M58, M58, M61, M62, M65, M66, M67, M602, A74(M) , A627(M), A41, A55, A56, A66, A483, A494, A550, A556, A585, A590, A595, A663, A5036, A5103, A5117 |
| Area 12 | Derbyshire, East Riding of Yorkshire, Lincolnshire, North Yorkshire, South Yorkshire, West Yorkshire | M1, M18, M62, M180, M181, M606, M621, A1(M), A1, A57, A61, A63, A64, A160, A162, A180, A616, A628, A1033 |
| Area 14 | County Durham, Northumberland, North Yorkshire, Tyne and Wear | A1(M), A66(M), A194(M), A1, A19, A66, A184, A696 |

Design, build, finance and operate (DBFO) roads
| DBFO area | DBFO name | Roads managed | DBFO Company | Commencement date |
|---|---|---|---|---|
| 5 | M25, link roads to GLA Boundary, Berks, Bucks, Herts, Essex, Kent & Surrey | M1, M3, M4, M11, M20, M25, M26, A1(M), A1, A2, A3, A13, A20, A23, A30, A40, A282, A316, A405, A1089, A3113 | Connect Plus (M25) | October 2009 |
| 25 | A69 Newcastle to Carlisle | A69 | Road Link (A69) | April 1996 |
| 26 | A19 Dishforth to Tyne Tunnel | A19, A168, A174, A1053 | Autolink Concessionaires (A19) | February 1997 |
| 27 | M1-A1 Link (Lofthouse to Bramham) | M1, M62, A1(M) | Connect M1-A1 | April 1996 |
| 28 | A50 / A564 Stoke to Derby | A6, A50 | Connect A50 | July 1996 |
| 29 | A1(M) Alconbury to Peterborough | A1(M) | Road Management Services (Peterborough) | April 1996 |
| 30 | M40 (J1-15) Denham to Warwick | M40 | UK Highways M40 | January 1996 |
| 31 | A417 / A419 Swindon to Gloucester | A417, A419 | Road Management Services (Gloucester) | April 1996 |
| 32 | A30 / A35 Exeter to Bere Regis | A30, A35 | Connect A30/A35 | October 1996 |
| 33 | A1 Darrington to Dishforth | A1(M) | Road Management Services (Darrington) | March 2003 |
| 34 | A249 Stockbury (M2) to Sheerness | A249 | Sheppey Route | February 2004 |

Toll roads
| Toll concession | Concessionaire | Opening date |
|---|---|---|
| M6 Toll | Midland Expressway | December 2003 |

=== Improving the network ===
In common with the regulated sectors, National Highways works to fixed funding periods called Road Periods. Each Road Period is currently five years in length, and a particular Road Investment Strategy (RIS) will broadly align with this. Before a new Road Period starts, National Highways will provide the Secretary of State for Transport with an SRN Initial Report, including an assessment of the state of the SRN, maintenance and enhancement priorities, and future development needs. Following this, the government produces a draft RIS setting out the high-level outputs that National Highways will need to deliver within the corresponding Road Period, alongside the proposed funding.

National Highways will then respond with a Strategic Business Plan detailing its plans for delivering the RIS. This is reviewed by the Highways Monitor to assess whether the proposed requirements are deliverable with the proposed financial resources and sufficiently challenging. After the Strategic Business Plan and RIS are finalised, National Highways must deliver the agreed outputs and will be monitored on its progress by the Highways Monitor.

Development of the SRN is achieved through National Highways' capital investment programme, funded entirely by government through grant-in-aid and set out in the first Road Investment Strategy. For Road Period 1 (2015–20), Highways England invested around £15 billion in its network, with additional funding to address other local challenges in proximity of the SRN relating to the environment; air quality; cycling, safety and integration; and growth and housing.

For Road Period 2 (2020–25), National Highways will invest over £27 billion in its network, of which £14 billion is for road enhancements. The rest is for operating, maintaining and renewing its roads, and further funding to address challenges on the environment and wellbeing; users and communities; innovation and modernisation; and safety and congestion. As of this Road Period, National Highways' activities will, at least in part, be funded by vehicle excise duty.

== Organisation ==
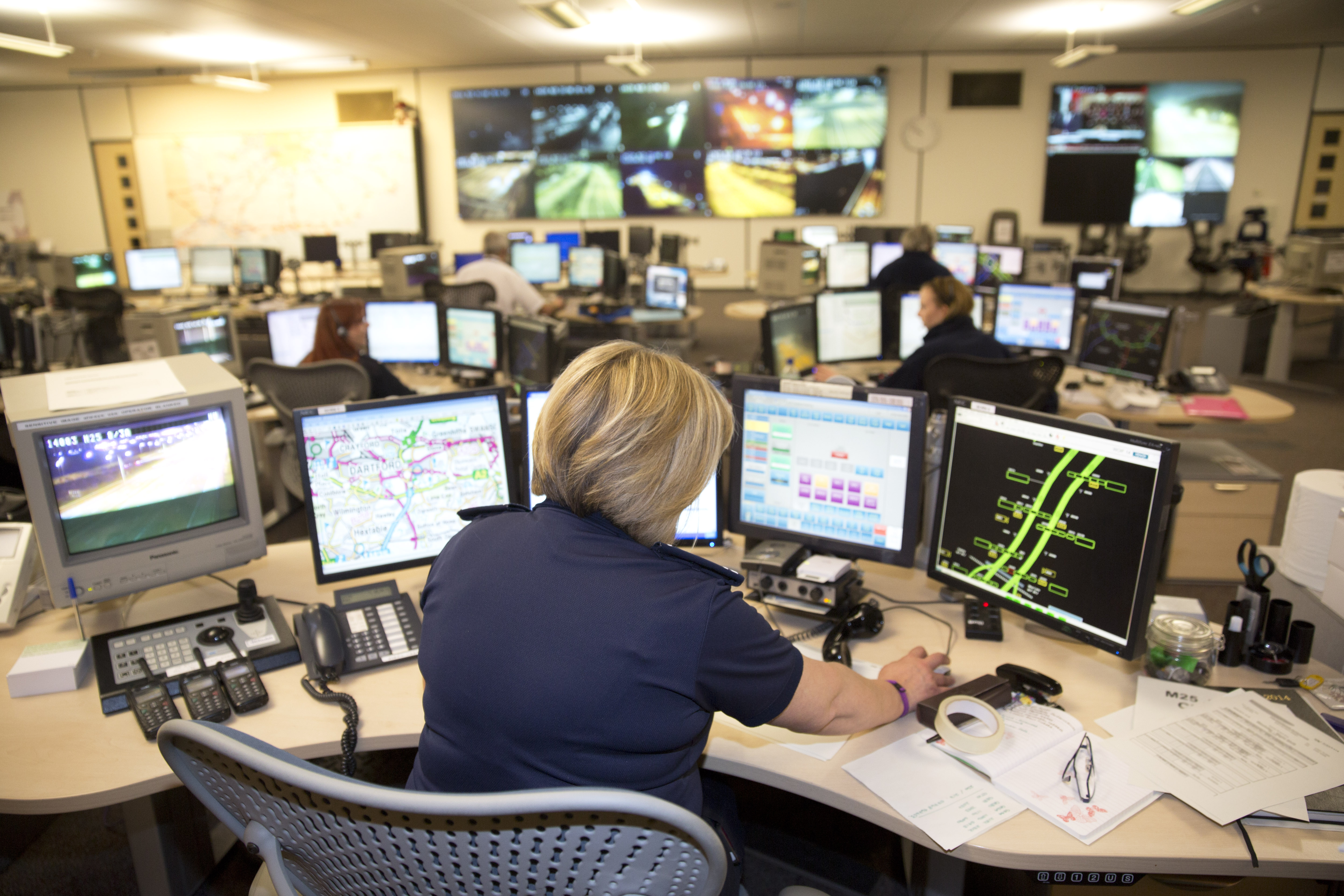
Their control room

=== Head office ===
The company head office is in Bridge House, on a one-way gyratory in Guildford, Surrey. Previously its head office was in Dorking, Surrey. In 2014, the agency signed a ten-year lease with the owner of the Guildford facility.

=== National Traffic Information Service (NTIS) ===
Sopra Steria operates the National Traffic Information Service (NTIS) on behalf of National Highways. NTIS is the information hub of England's strategic road network.

The service is based at Quinton, Birmingham and is responsible for providing accurate, historical, real-time and predictive traffic and incident information to businesses, the travelling public and National Highways' operations. It collects real-time traffic information from over 10,000 fixed sites on the motorway and all-purpose trunk road network from MIDAS and Traffic Monitoring Unit (TMU) electronic loops in the road surface and automatic number plate recognition (ANPR) cameras at the roadside.

NTIS has access to nearly 2,000 CCTV cameras, 300 weather stations, 4,600 roadside electronic signs, 16,000 roadside electronic matrix signals and incident data from over 250 operational partners, including the police and local authorities.

It processes this data to create useful intelligence for operational decision making and dissemination of current and predictive information to the public using the 4,600 roadside variable-message signs, the National Highways website (including a mobile version), social media channels such as Twitter and the telephone-based National Highways customer contact centre and distributing information to the media and businesses through a number of data feeds. These feeds are widely used by organisations such as the BBC and local newspaper websites for their own traffic information. Services such as Google Maps and sat-nav operators also use National Highways' data for their traffic information.

=== Area teams ===
The motorway network is divided into "Areas". They are contracts that are awarded by the Department for Transport. The area teams work alongside the National Highways Traffic Officer Service – providing incident support, emergency traffic management and infrastructure maintenance. They are responsible for the management and operation of the roads in their area. In 2009, fleet tracking has been deployed to assist area teams to manage their specialist winter maintenance vehicles during the cold snap.

=== Staff ===
National Highways employs uniformed traffic officers; on-road and control room, as well as specialist staff for work in engineering, surveying, accountancy, and administration. There is a graduate entry scheme, with general entry and specialist engineering entry options. For the Traffic Officer Service, each team is supervised by a team manager, one of between six and eight such managers generally working together, to ensure 24-hour management cover.

=== Fundraising ===
National Highways is partnering with The Tree Council to donate thousands of trees for community projects across the UK, aiming to plant three million trees by 2030 and support biodiversity. The article highlights corporate partnerships and fundraising initiatives, including BNP Paribas's donation for an IT suite upgrade, Peninsula Group's Giving Tuesday fundraiser, and M&S's commitment to training young people through its Marks & Start program.

== Governance and accountability ==
=== Formal governance structure ===
National Highways is a private company limited by shares, wholly owned by the Secretary of State for Transport. The National Highways Board is the primary governance arm of the company and is accountable to the Secretary of State for Transport. The Board delegate responsibility of the day-to-day running of the company to the Chief Executive who, as the Accounting Officer, is accountable to the Permanent Secretary of the Department for Transport, as the Principal Accounting Officer, for the stewardship of public funds. The Principal Accounting Officer and Secretary of State for Transport are both ultimately accountable to Parliament for the activities and performance of National Highways.

=== Performance monitoring ===
The Infrastructure Act 2015 established the Office of Rail and Road (ORR) as the monitor for National Highways. ORR is responsible for monitoring and enforcing the performance and efficiency of National Highways, and advising the Secretary of State for Transport on its compliance against the Road Investment Strategy and Licence. The Act also established Transport Focus, previously Passenger Focus, as its watchdog, with the purpose of promoting and protecting the interests of users of the strategic road network.

== Traffic England ==
Traffic England was a website that gave information about the latest traffic conditions as well as details of any roadworks or events that may cause congestion. By selecting current motorway information users could see the average speed between individual motorway junctions, what is being displayed on all the variable-message signs, and images from traffic cameras. The website was run by National Highways' National Traffic Information Service, but was closed on 30 June 2026.

== Survive Group ==
The Survive Group is a partnership between National Highways, the National Police Chiefs' Council, the breakdown/recovery industry and other road service providers. The Survive Group has been established to improve the safety of those who work on the road network and the travelling public and is dedicated to the promotion of driving safety. The name Survive comes from Safe Use of Roadside Verges in Vehicular Emergencies.

The Survive Group website holds information on the Survive Group membership details and activities being undertaken by the working groups. It supplies advice on how to drive safely in a wide range of driving conditions, advice on planning journeys. Survive provides publications and new guidance produced by the Survive members plus news on new initiatives and forthcoming road safety events.

== Historical Railways Estate ==
In 2013, Highways England took over responsibility for the Historical Railways Estate (HRE) from BRB (Residuary) Limited.

=== Bridge infilling ===
==== Great Musgrave Bridge ====
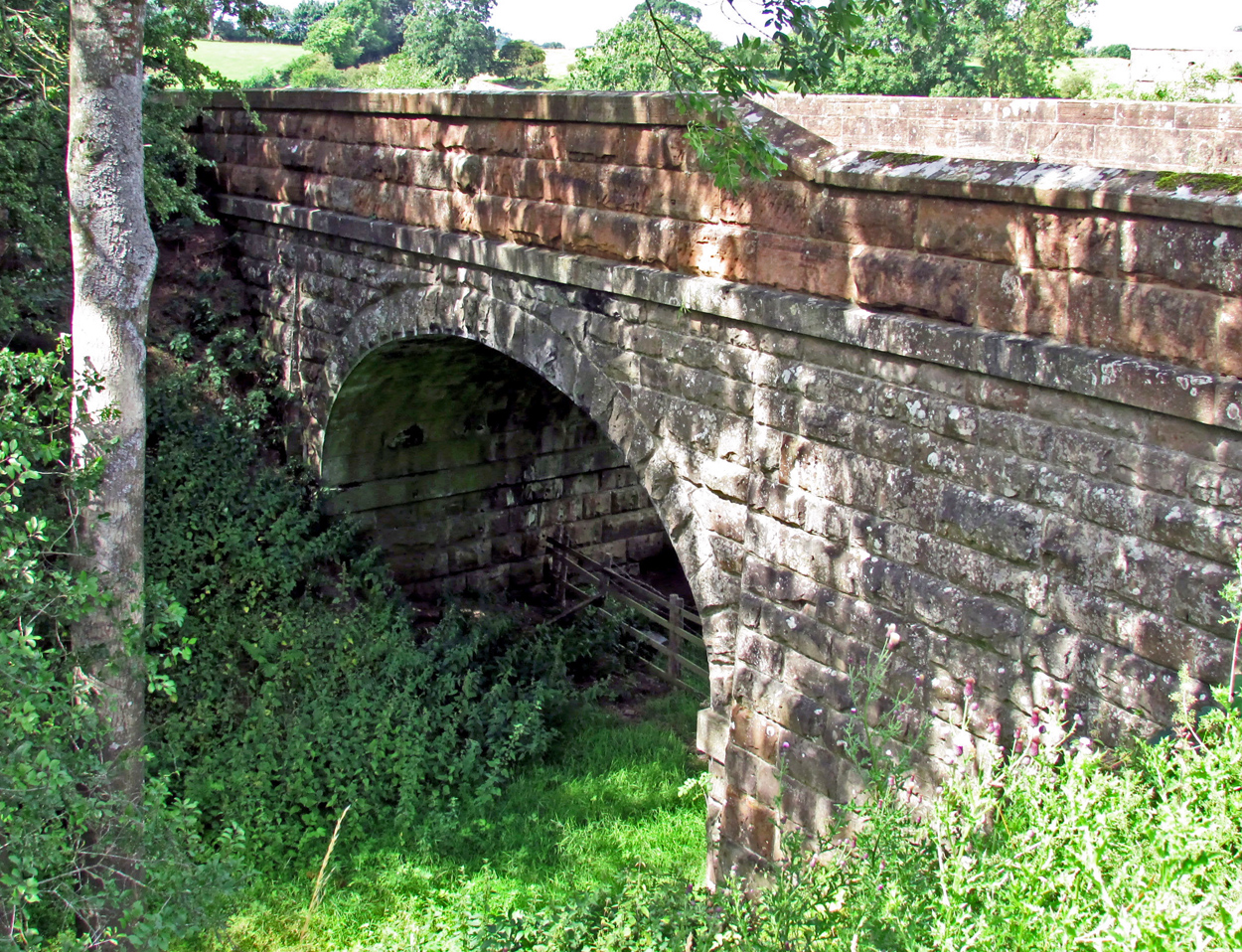
A surviving bridge over railway cutting just north of the station in 2016

In May and June 2021, the space under the road bridge at Great Musgrave in Cumbria was filled with 1,600 tonnes of aggregate and concrete by Highways England, ostensibly for what HRE managers considered safety reasons. The bridge spanned a 5-mile (8.0 km) section of trackbed which local rail enthusiasts hoped to restore, linking the Eden Valley and Stainmore railways to create an 11-mile (18 km) tourist line between Appleby and Kirkby Stephen.

Accused of 'vandalism', Highways England were forced to apply for retrospective planning permission, with Eden District council receiving 913 objections and only two expressions of support, and government intervention to pause National Highways plans to infill dozens of other Victorian bridges across England. Advised by planning officers to reject the application, the council's planning committee unanimously refused retrospective planning permission in June 2022.

Restoration of the Musgrave bridge to its former condition would cost an £431,000, in addition to the £124,000 spent on the initial infilling work. In July 2023, National Highways' plans to restore the bridge and remove the infill were criticised by locals as they involved closing the bridge for three months, necessitating long local diversions for regular users of the B6259 which crosses the bridge. Work began in August 2023 to remove the infill material.

After the Great Musgrave outcry, National Highways developed a new way to assess the abandoned rail bridges and tunnels it controls, with decisions reviewed in collaboration with experts from heritage, environmental and active travel sectors. The stakeholder advisory forum includes the Department for Transport, Sustrans, Railway Paths Ltd, Railway Heritage Trust, the HRE Group, Heritage Railway Association, Natural England, Historic England (also representing Cadw), Historic Scotland and ADEPT.

==== Congham Bridge ====
In 2021, at Congham in Norfolk, a railway bridge designed by the pioneering M&GNJR engineer William Marriott was infilled by National Highways. The railway route had been identified as part of a proposed footpath and cycleway between King's Lynn and Fakenham, and in January 2023 King's Lynn and West Norfolk Borough Council demanded that National Highways submit a retrospective planning application.

==== Rudgate Bridge ====
In 2021, an 1847 skewed masonry arch at Rudgate near Tadcaster, designed by John Cass Birkinshaw for the Harrogate–Church Fenton line, was infilled by National Highways. The agency had to seek retrospective planning approval from North Yorkshire Council for the infilling work and work on trees protected by a tree preservation order.

== See also ==
- Transport Scotland
- Transport for the North
- North and Mid Wales Trunk Road Agent
- South Wales Trunk Road Agent
- Department of Economy and Transport in Wales
- Traffic Radio
- DfI Roads
- Survive Group
- Transport for London Road Network
- Off-Network Tactical Diversion Route
- Design Manual for Roads and Bridges
- Concrete step barrier
- HADECS
- National Roads Telecommunications Services, also known as the NRTS, which control the variable-message signs (VMS)
