= PAS 43 =

British occupational safety standard

PAS 43 is a British Standard for safe working in recovery of broken-down vehicles.

As of March 2025, the latest version of the standard is PAS 43:2018.
