= Traffic Radio =

English digital radio station

Traffic Radio was a digital radio station based in England.

It was a 24-hour rolling traffic and travel service for motorways and major roads in England, run for the Highways Agency by Global Traffic Network.

Traffic Radio could be heard on DAB digital radio, 1386 MW (Birmingham only) and via the internet. It was available 24 hours a day, seven days a week and was updated every ten minutes during rush hour and every twenty minutes at other times. It offered regional traffic news, depending on which part of the country people were listening, as well as national headlines. The information came from the National Traffic Control Centre, which has access to over 1,000 CCTV cameras and 3,750 road sensors, as well as information from the Highways Agency's seven regional control centres.

Traffic Radio was broadcast in six regional variants: This was a list of those variants and the DAB multiplexes on which they broadcast:

- West & Southwest (code C0D1) – Bath and west Wiltshire, Bournemouth, Bristol and Bath, Cornwall, Exeter and Torbay, Plymouth, Swindon
- South & East (code C1D1) – Cambridge, Kent, Norwich, Reading, Southend and Chelmsford, South Hampshire, Sussex Coast
- Midlands (code C2D1) – Birmingham, Coventry, Leicester, Nottingham, Peterborough, Stoke-on-Trent, Wolverhampton, Shrewsbury, Telford
- Yorkshire/Northeast (code C3D1) – Bradford and Huddersfield, Humberside, Leeds, South Yorkshire, Teesside, Tyneside
- Northwest (code C4D1) – Central Lancashire, Liverpool, Manchester
- London (code C5D1) – London

(London took the South and East version before subsequently switching to its own dedicated version operated with the assistance of Transport for London)

The station closed at 15:00 on 31 August 2011 after the project was axed following the government spending review. Barry Lewis was the last Southeast and London reporter, Simon Temby was the last North West reporter and Andrew Bassett the last North East reporter.

The Highways Agency advertised an opportunity to license the Traffic Radio brand and operate a similar service at no cost to the taxpayer. Expressions of interest were received, but no company was prepared to take this forward.
