= National Tyre Distributors Association =

The National Tyre Distributors Association (NTDA). is a trade association based in the United Kingdom. The NTDA directorate is based in Aylesbury, Buckinghamshire.

== Overview ==
It was created in 1930 and represents tyre wholesalers, retailers, mobile tyre fitters and fast fit companies across the UK. It also has supplier members that include leading tyre manufacturers, retreaders, repairers and end of life tyre collectors and automotive aftermarket companies. It represents the interests of those members by actively lobbying UK and European Government in relation to key issues such as non-compliant, unsafe and illegal part-worn tyres, tyre ageing, tyre tread depth law, EU Tyre Labelling and environmentally sound collection and disposal of tyres

== Activities ==
The NTDA runs an Annual Dinner and the Tyre Industry Awards. It also runs the National Tyre Industry Conference and many regional social and business events for the UK tyre industry.

For many years the NTDA has run a national scheme called TyreLink a breakdown scheme, which coordinates members of the Association to offer a 24-hour roadside breakdown service for trucks.

== Executives ==
Since its formation, the NTDA has had 55 elected Presidents and, after the change of title in 1999, 10 National Chairman. The current National Chairman of the Association is Simon Wright Commercial Director at Halfords Fleet Services who replaced Martin O'Brien Commercial Director of Lodge Tyre Co Ltd in 2022. Martin O'Brien served from 2019 having replaced Prashant Chopra, Managing Director of Autogem Invicta Ltd, who in turn, replaced Roger Griggs, Communications Director at European Tyre Enterprises Ltd in 2017 The current Chief Executive of the NTDA is Stefan Hay who has held the position since January 2014.

The NTDA also administers the Roadside Emergency Action Concerning Tyres (REACT) steering group. REACT operates as a dedicated group within the NTDA. It was launched in October 2011, for all truck tyre technicians who work for companies in membership of the NTDA. The scheme records and monitors the training of technicians working on the roadside throughout the UK. Trained technicians are issued with individual licences.

== See also ==
- Avon Safety Wheel
