= National Highways traffic officer =

Road transport occupation in England

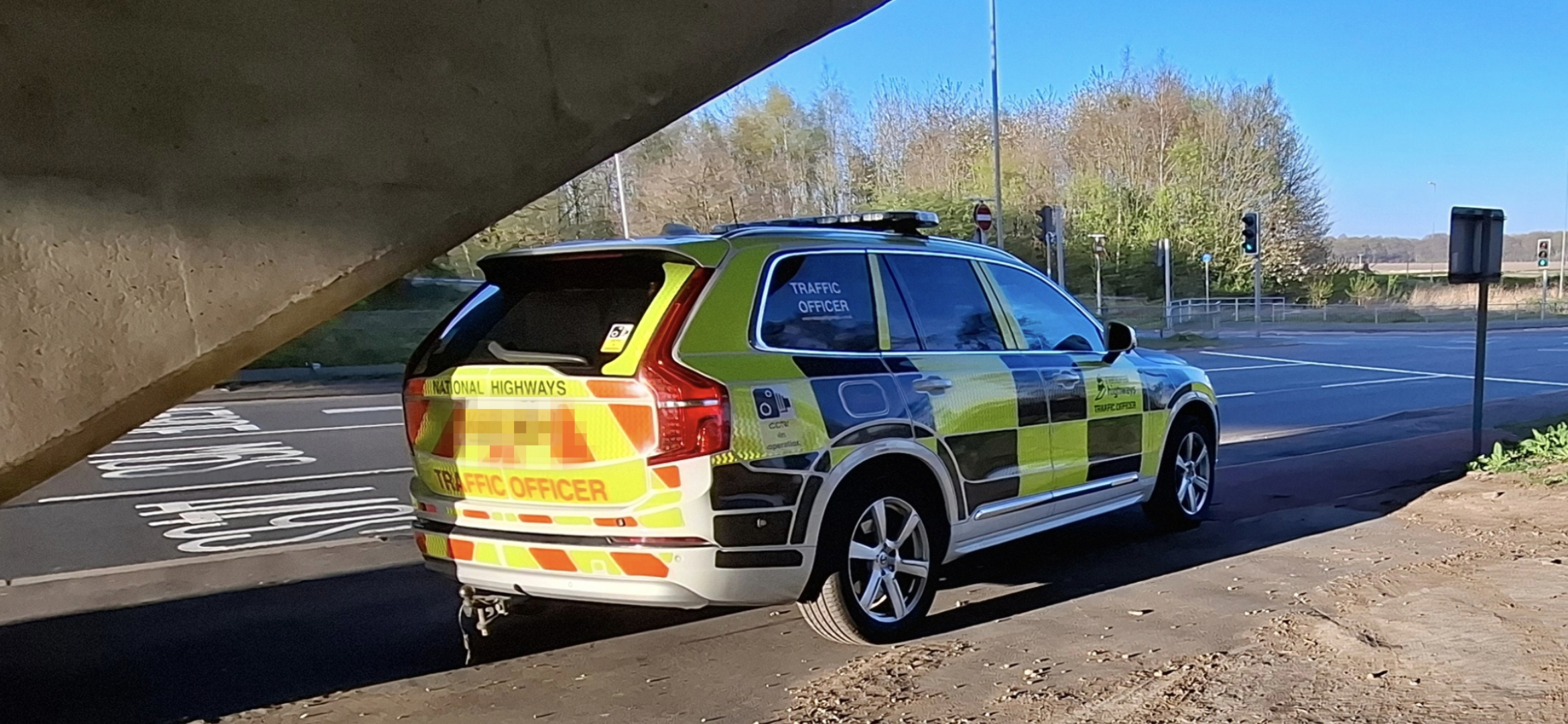
- A 2022 Volvo XC90 PHEV National Highways traffic officer patrol and response vehicle

Occupation
- Activity sectors: Government, road traffic control, vehicle recovery, roadside assistance

Description
- Fields of employment: Strategic road network in England operated by National Highways.
- Related jobs: Road policing unit, Traffic guard

National Highways traffic officers, previously Highways England traffic officers (2015–2021) and Highways Agency traffic officers (HATO 2004–2015), are employed by National Highways in England.

They are a civilian service who respond to both emergency and routine incidents on the strategic road network operated by National Highways.

In April 2004, Highways Agency traffic officers began working alongside the police on motorways in the West Midlands. Initial patrols were along the M5, M6 and M42, with 50 individuals. National roll-out of traffic officers was completed on 18 July 2006, starting to cover all of the motorway network within England, i.e. which functions as a subsidiary of the National Highways, and the All-Purpose Trunk Road (APTR) network.

This is a civilian role, operated in accordance with National Guidance Framework agreed with the National Police Chiefs' Council.

== Operations ==
=== Uniform ===
Traffic officers wear two-tone orange and yellow high-visibility jackets. They wear dark blue cargo trousers with high visibility and retroreflective markings at the bottom. All on road traffic officers wear black, steel toe-capped boots. Staff are issued a range of gloves suitable for tasks such as clearing debris, a safety helmet and protective goggles for dealing with overturned vehicles, and a range of hats for varied weather conditions. Traffic officers are also issued a white collared shirt and black tie for appearances in court in the course of their duties. All officers carry portable Airwave radios, for communication with other traffic officers, the control rooms, and other emergency services.

=== Vehicles and equipment ===
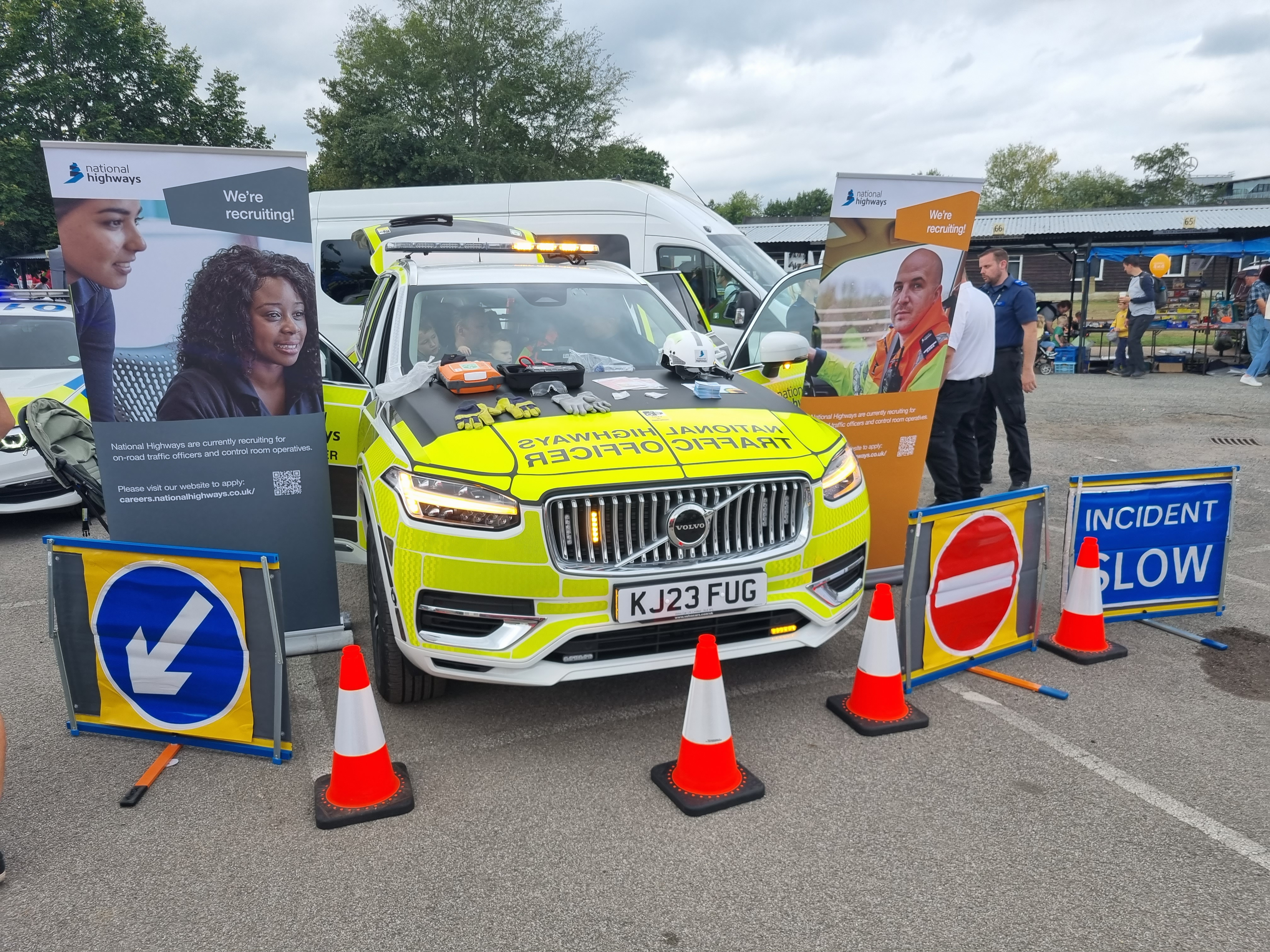
National Highways traffic officer patrol vehicle with some equipment on display at an open house.

Traffic officers patrol the motorway network and all-purpose trunk roads (Note: Any road in England for which the Secretary of State or a strategic highways company is the traffic authority or a road in Wales for which the Assembly is the traffic authority.) in high-visibility patrol vehicles, that feature black and yellow Battenburg liveries, amber and white front-facing lighting and amber and red rear-facing lighting. According to The Highway Code, when faced with a traffic officer vehicle displaying flashing amber lights responding to an incident, you should take appropriate action to let it pass.

The vehicles have all-wheel drive capabilities and are used to assist in the management of incidents and, where appropriate, clear broken-down or disabled vehicles to places of safety off the carriageways. The vehicles can operate in severe weather and carry equipment including an emergency traffic management kit, automated external defibrillator (AED), medical trauma kit and other specialised equipment required to safely deal with a range of different incidents. The combination of the vehicles' size, liveries and ancillary lighting enhances their visibility when positioned at incidents. They are also fitted with Airwave radios, hands-free mobile telephones, alternating flashing headlights,emergency vehicle lighting and bull horns to assist with progressing through stationary traffic on approach to incidents. They also have Variable Message Panels (VMPs) in the rear windows which display messages such as "do not pass" for rolling roadblocks or scrolling "keep left and right" chevrons for use at incidents.

Traffic officers use different models of 4×4 vehicles, with a mixed fleet of plug-in hybrid electric vehicles (PHEVs) and diesel-powered with automatic transmissions. Vehicles used for patrolling as of 2026 include Volvo XC90 (PHEV), Tesla Model Y (Full EV), Kia EV9 (Full EV) and BMW X5 (PHEV).

=== Communications ===
Traffic officers maintain contact with each other and the regional operational control centres by use of Sepura hand-held and vehicle TETRA radios using the Airwave network, and enabling officers to co-ordinate with other Airwave users. Each patrol vehicle is also fitted with a hands-free mobile phone.

=== Incidents ===
Traffic officers attend incidents ranging from live lane breakdowns and road debris to road traffic collisions (RTCs) taking the lead command role, except where there is an incident involving loss of life or life-changing injuries in which case the Police retain oversight.

== Powers ==
Traffic officers principally derive powers from the Traffic Management Act 2004 and have jurisdiction over the strategic road network of England, under authorisation given by the secretary of state. Traffic officers are able to exercise their powers on any road in England and Wales, provided that it is with permission from the chief of police for the relevant force in which the road is situated, or the relevant traffic authority for the road.

=== Traffic Management Act 2004 ===
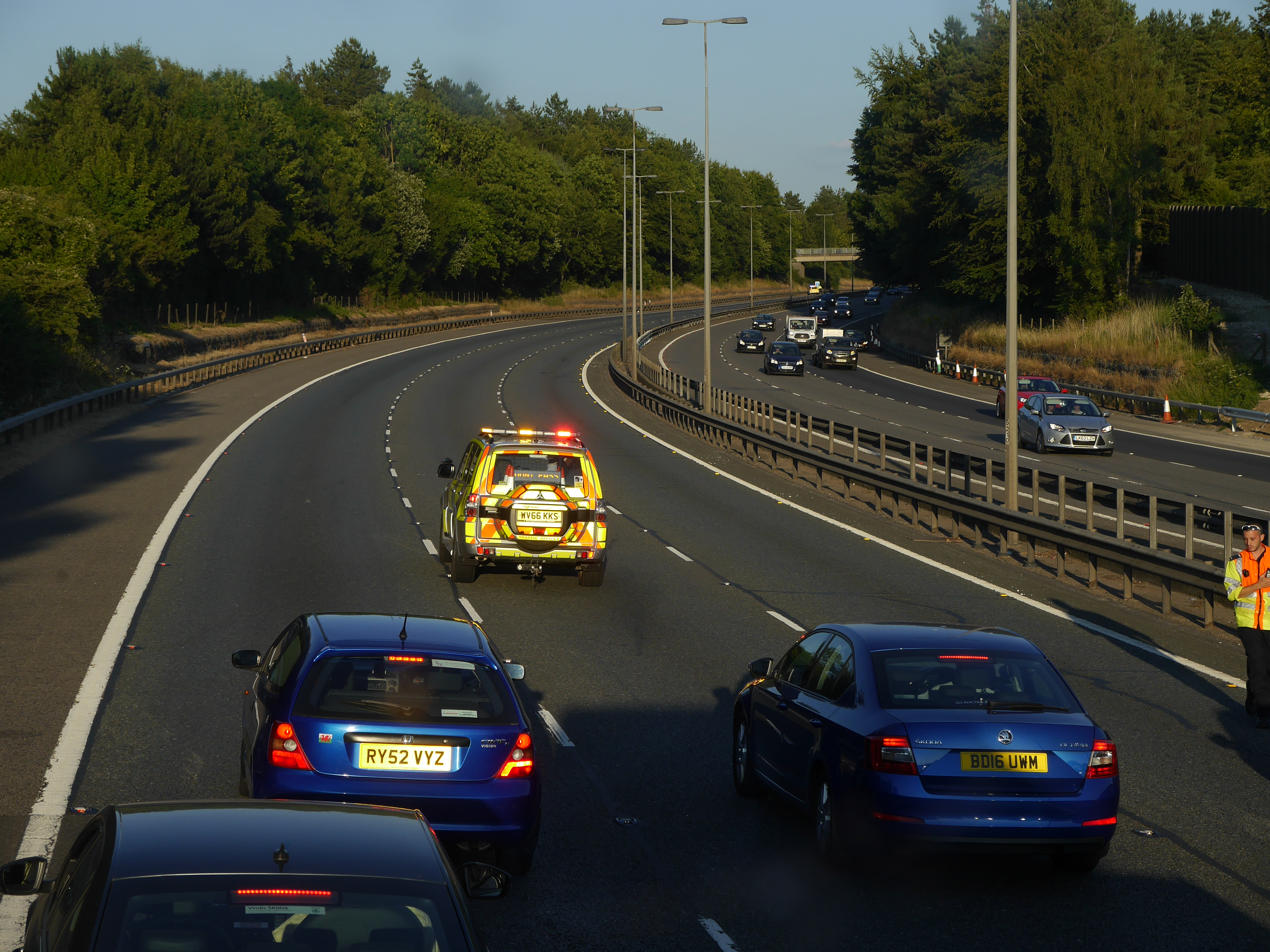
A road block on the M40 motorway implemented by a traffic officer

To exercise their powers, a traffic officer must be on duty and in uniform.

For the purposes of:

- maintaining or enhancing the flow of traffic on a relevant road under the jurisdiction of the traffic officer
- preventing or mitigating the effects of anything causing (or having the potential to cause) congestion or other disruptions to the flow of traffic on such a road
- avoiding danger to those using the road (or mitigating the risks of any such danger arising)
- preventing damage to, or to anything on or near, such a road

A traffic officer may:

- direct a person driving or propelling a vehicle to stop the vehicle, or to make it proceed in, or keep to, a particular line of traffic
- for the purposes of a traffic survey of any description which is being carried out on or in the vicinity of a road, to direct a person driving or propelling a vehicle to stop the vehicle, or to make it proceed in, or keep to, a particular line of traffic, or to proceed to a particular point on or near the road on which the vehicle is being driven or propelled (subject to the restriction in section 35(3) of the Road Traffic Act 1988 (c. 52))
- when regulating vehicular traffic in a road, direct persons on foot (or such persons and other traffic) to stop
- direct a person driving a mechanically propelled vehicle, or riding a cycle, on a road to stop the vehicle or cycle
- place and temporarily maintain traffic signs on a road
- remove and dispose of vehicles in line with the Removal and Disposal of Vehicles (Traffic Officers) (England) Regulations 2008

It is an offence to assault, resist or wilfully obstruct a traffic officer in the execution of their duty, as well as impersonate a traffic officer.

It is an offence to fail to provide your name and address if it is suspected that you failed to comply with directions given by a traffic officer, or an indication by a traffic sign placed by a traffic officer

National Highways traffic officers do not themselves have any powers of arrest, or to search, issue fixed penalties or report for summons for any motoring offence. However, traffic officer patrol vehicles are fitted with CCTV and any footage of motorists committing a traffic offence can be forwarded to the police for prosecution. Furthermore, traffic officers are issued with body worn cameras, footage from which may be used by the police for prosecution of any offences captured. Breaching a rolling road block, or failing to stop when requested by a traffic officer are offences which are likely to be prosecuted. The number of prosecutions has increased in line with the fitting of CCTV to traffic officer vehicles.

Drivers are obliged by the Traffic Management Act 2004 to comply with directions to pull over and/or stop given by traffic officers.

=== Removal and disposal of vehicles ===
Since 2008, traffic officers have had the powers to directly arrange recovery of abandoned, broken-down or damaged vehicles. Previously vehicle recoveries had been arranged through local police forces. The powers to allow traffic officers to remove vehicles are detailed in The Removal and Disposal of Vehicles (Traffic Officers) (England) Regulations 2008, including types of roads, restrictions on the powers and requirements of notice regarding situations where vehicles appear abandoned.

Vehicles that are stopped, parked or broken down on a relevant road (Note: Any road in England, which the Secretary of State is the traffic authority; except for some portions of the M48 and the M4 in Wales.) in a dangerous location or pose an obstruction or danger to other road users may be promptly removed under the 2008 Act. Traffic officers have the authority to instruct a vehicle owner or operator, if present, to remove the vehicle. An individual is obligated to comply as soon as practical. A vehicle owner or operator is allowed to make their own arrangements or method of removal. Traffic officers can prohibit an individual from removing a vehicle in an unsafe manner and authority to arrange removal themselves if a safe method of removal can't be agreed upon. Traffic officers can also arrange to have a vehicle removed themselves, should the vehicle appear abandoned or an operator is not present.

Traffic officers removal powers also extend to roads that are not considered 'relevant roads' under the 2008 regulations. Traffic officers have similar powers to either instruct a vehicle operator to remove a vehicle, or remove an abandoned one themselves. The removal must be in service of preventing or removing a danger to road users on a relevant road, or preventing obstruction of a relevant road.

Traffic officers can also remove vehicles that appear to be illegally abandoned on land adjacent to a relevant road. This removal is done according to Section 99 and Section 100 of the Road Traffic Regulation Act 1984; requiring written notice either to the occupier of the land in question, or leaving written notice near the location of the vehicle if the land's occupier can not be identified.

=== National Vehicle Recovery Manager ===
Since obtaining vehicle removal powers in 2008, National Highways has contracted with FMG to coordinating the dispatch vehicle recovery services to recover recover individual vehicles at the direction of traffic officers. This contract was renewed for a third time on 1 April 2020 for a 7 year period, lasting through 2027.

== Regional operations centres ==
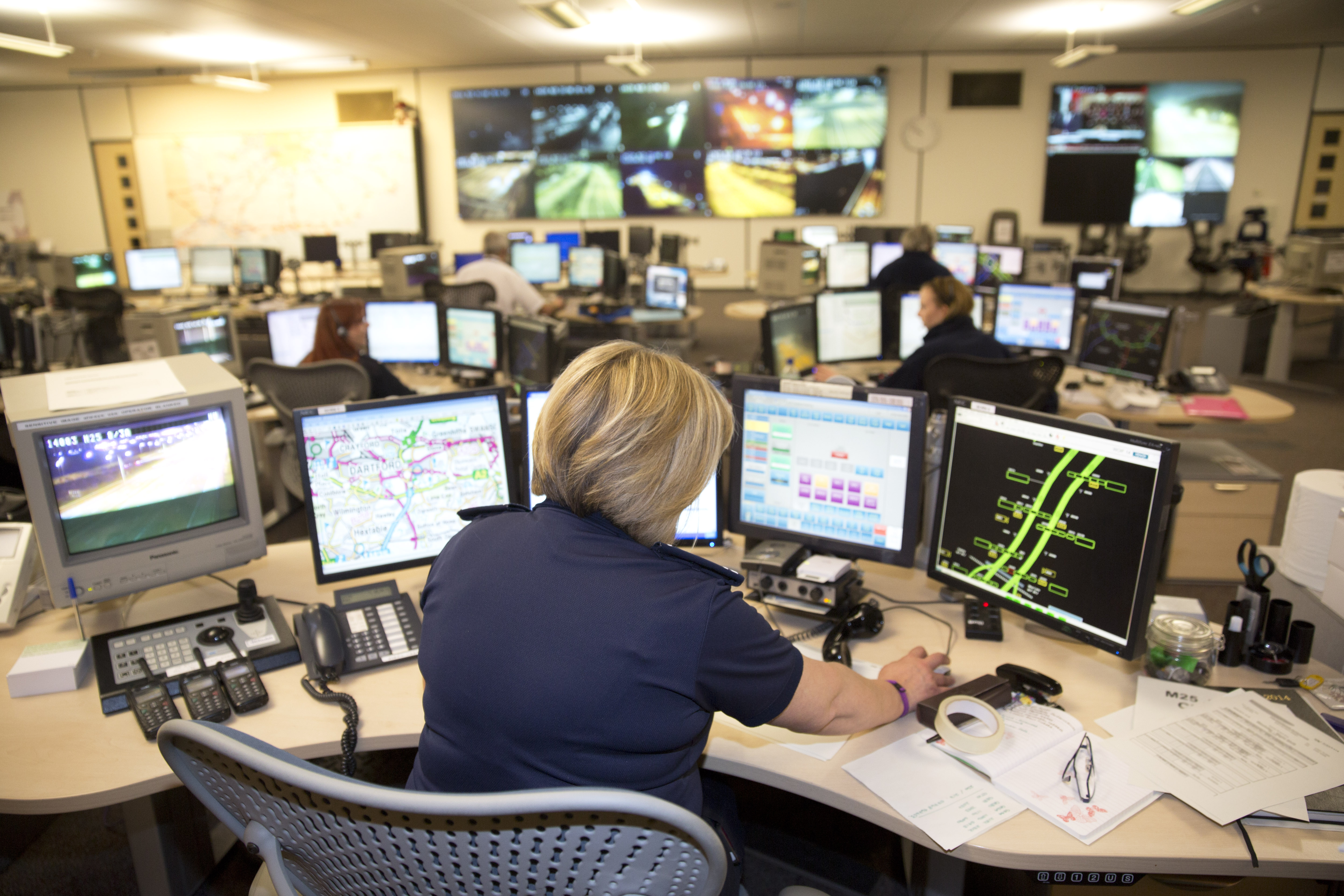
A National Highways (Note: Known as Highways England at the time) control room in 2014.

Seven regional operational centres (Note: formerly known as 'regional control centres'), are dispersed around England and serve as the control rooms for everyday operations. There is also a National Traffic Operational Centre, based in Birmingham. Operation centres answer the orange emergency roadside telephones on the motorway and trunk road network, liaise with breakdown organisations, allocate traffic officers to incidents, monitor the CCTV system, control the electronic variable-message signs on the roads and supply information to the National Traffic Operational Centre. Some ROCs are co-located with the police.

Regional operations centres
Name	Region	Location
Birmingham	National	52.4538°N 2.0106°W
Newton-le-Willows	North West	53.4653°N 2.6212°W
Wakefield	Yorkshire & North East	53.6556°N 1.5265°W
Nottingham (East Midlands)	Midlands	52.9820°N 1.2396°W
Birmingham (West Midlands)	Midlands	52.4541°N 2.0096°W
Hertfordshire	East	51.6863°N 0.2256°W
Bristol	South West	51.5393°N 2.5773°W
Surrey	South East	51.2569°N 0.0676°W
