= Trunk road =

Type of major road, usually connecting major settlements

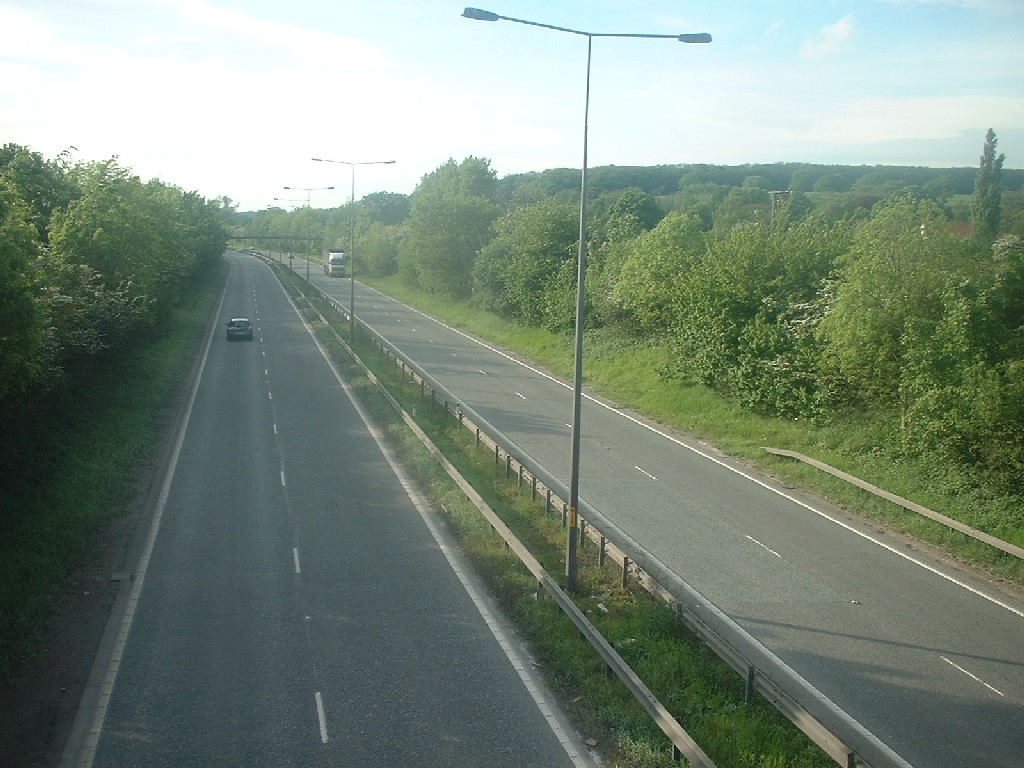
A63(T) trunk road connecting Hull to the M62 motorway in England.

A trunk road is a major highway with a specific legal classification in some jurisdictions, notably the United Kingdom, Sweden and formerly Ireland. Trunk roads are planned and managed at the national level, distinguishing them from non-trunk roads which are managed by local authorities. Trunk roads are important routes usually connecting two or more cities, ports, airports and other places, which is the recommended route for long-distance and freight traffic. Many trunk roads have segregated lanes in a dual carriageway, or are of motorway standard.

The term trunk road, or trunk highway, is sometimes used more generically to refer to other categories of major highway.

== United Kingdom ==
Trunk Roads Act 1936 (Note: Section 14(1).)
- Act of Parliament
- Parliament of the United Kingdom
- Long title: An Act to provide that the Minister of Transport shall be the highway authority for the principal roads in Great Britain which constitute the national system of routes for through traffic; to make consequential amendments in the law relating to highways; and for purposes connected with the matters aforesaid.
- Citation: 1 Edw. 8. & 1 Geo. 6. c. 5
- Territorial extent: England and Wales; Scotland; (Note: Section 14(2).)

Dates
- Royal assent: 18 December 1936
- Commencement: 1 April 1937 (Note: Section 1(2).)
- Repealed: 16 November 1989
Other legislation
Amended by	Local Government (Scotland) Act 1947; Town and Country Planning Act 1947; Town and Country Planning (Scotland) Act 1947; Highways Act 1959; Road Traffic Act 1960; Local Government (Scotland) Act 1966; Statute Law (Repeals) Act 1973; Statute Law (Repeals) Act 1978
Repealed by	Statute Law (Repeals) Act 1989

Status: Repealed

Text of statute as originally enacted

Trunk Roads Act 1946 (Note: Section 17(1).)
- Act of Parliament
- Parliament of the United Kingdom
- Long title: An Act to amend the law relating to Trunk Roads; and for purposes connected therewith.
- Citation: 9 & 10 Geo. 6. c. 30
- Territorial extent: England and Wales; Scotland; (Note: Section 17(2).)

Dates
- Royal assent: 6 March 1946
- Commencement: 1 April 1946 (Note: Section 1(1).)
- Repealed: 16 November 1989
Other legislation
Amended by	Town and Country Planning Act 1947; Town and Country Planning (Scotland) Act 1947; Statute Law Revision Act 1953; Highways Act 1959; Road Traffic Act 1960; Statute Law (Repeals) Act 1973; Statute Law (Repeals) Act 1978
Repealed by	Statute Law (Repeals) Act 1989

Status: Repealed

Text of statute as originally enacted

In the United Kingdom, trunk roads were first defined for Great Britain in the Trunk Roads Act 1936 (1 Edw. 8. & 1 Geo. 6. c. 5). Thirty major roads were classed as trunk roads, and the Minister of Transport took direct control of them and the bridges across them. The Trunk Roads Act came into force in England and Wales on 1 April 1937, and in Scotland on 16 May 1937. This development did not extend to Northern Ireland, which has always had a separate system of highway and road traffic law.

At that time, 4,500 miles (7,200 km) of British roads were classified as trunk roads. Additional roads have been "trunked", notably in the Trunk Roads Act 1946 (9 & 10 Geo. 6. c. 30). Others, like virtually all British motorways, have entered the system as a result of new construction. As of 2004, Great Britain had 7,845 mi (12,625 km) of trunk roads, of which 2,161 mi (3,478 km) were motorways.

Since 1994, trunk roads in England have been managed by National Highways (formerly Highways England, and before that, Highways Agency), while Scotland has had responsibility for its own trunk roads since 1998; these are currently managed by Transport Scotland, created in 2006. The Welsh Government has had responsibility for trunk roads in Wales since its establishment in 1998.

England has 4,300 miles (6,900 km), Scotland has 1,982 miles (3,190 km) and Wales has 1,048 miles (1,687 km) of trunk roads, inclusive of motorways. National Highways publishes a full network map of trunk roads and motorways in England.

Most interurban trunk roads are primary routes, the category of roads recommended for long distance and freight transport. Not all primary routes are trunk roads, the difference being that maintenance of trunk roads is paid for by national government bodies rather than the local councils in whose area they lie. Primary routes are identified by their direction signs, which feature white text on a green background with route numbers in yellow. Trunk roads, like other "A" roads, can be either single- or dual-carriageway.

Historically, trunk roads were listed on maps with a "T" in brackets after their number, to distinguish them from non-trunk parts of the same road, but this suffix is no longer included on current Ordnance Survey maps, which simply distinguish between primary and non-primary "A" roads. A trunk road which has been upgraded to motorway standards may retain its original "A" number, but with an "M" in brackets to denote that motorway regulations apply on it. Long distance examples of this are the A1(M) in England, and the A74(M) in Scotland.

=== De-trunking ===
It is possible for roads to be "de-trunked" – for example, when superseded by a motorway following a similar route – in which case they normally become ordinary "A" roads. When a road is de-trunked, signposts are often replaced, and sometimes route numbers are changed, making the original route of the road harder to follow. Roads are formally and legally detrunked by statutory instruments named 'Detrunking (or sometimes De-Trunking) Orders' which include a plan of the route being detrunked. The routes to be detrunked (as set out in detrunking orders) are not always linear sections, but can be split into multiple sections, and span multiple counties.

In England, the government has de-trunked much of the trunk road network since the late 1990s, transferring responsibility to local councils to allow National Highways to concentrate on a selection of core trunk routes, mostly dual carriageways and motorways.

== Sweden ==
The national trunk road network in southern Sweden (in northern Sweden, only the European routes are trunk roads)

The most important roads in Sweden are labelled "national trunk road". In 1982, the parliament decided upon which roads were to become national trunk roads. They are considered recommended main roads for long-distance traffic. They were also supposed to be used for movement and transport of heavy military vehicles, ordnance and logistics and during wartime were to be guarded and defended at all odds.

National trunk roads are planned and managed by the national Swedish Transport Administration, as opposed to other roads, which are planned locally. They also have a special, slightly larger budget. However, they are not signed in any special way. Therefore, there is no difference in signage, numbering, road standard or map marking from other national roads. Some national roads are only considered trunk for part of their length. National Roads 73 and 75 are both built to motorway standard and have high traffic, but are not considered trunk. European routes are always trunk in Sweden, and are more visible with special numbering.

=== List of Swedish trunk roads ===
- E4, Haparanda to Helsingborg
- E6, Trelleborg to Svinesund
- E10, Kiruna to Luleå
- E12, Lycksele to Holmsund
- E14, Storlien to Sundsvall
- E16, Norwegian border to Gävle
- E18, Västerås to Kapellskär
- E20, Malmö to Stockholm
- E22, Trelleborg to Norrköping
- E45, Gothenburg to Karesuando
- E65, Malmö to Ystad
- Riksväg 25, Halmstad to Kalmar
- Riksväg 26, Halmstad to Mora
- Riksväg 40, Gothenburg to Västervik
- Riksväg 50, Jönköping to Söderhamn
- Riksväg 56, Gävle to Norrköping
- Riksväg 70, Enköping to Mora

== Ireland ==
In Ireland, major roads were previously classified under an old system as "trunk roads", and had route numbers prefixed by a "T". Connecting roads were classified as 'link roads", and had route numbers prefixed by an "L". Many of these roads had their origins in historic routes, including turnpike roads.

Although a number of old road signs using these route designations may still be encountered, Ireland has adopted a newer classification scheme of national primary and national secondary routes ("N" roads), regional roads, and local roads. "N" roads remain equivalent to trunk roads in that they are planned and managed at the national level by the National Roads Authority.

=== De-trunking ===
Some former trunk roads, or sections of former trunk roads, became non-trunk regional roads under the new road numbering system introduced in the 1970s and 1980s. More recently, sections of former national primary routes which have been bypassed by motorways or other road improvement schemes have been downgraded to regional road status.

== Equivalents in other countries ==
The route nationale system in France and the national roads network in Poland are similar models of nationally planned and managed major highways.

In Canada, core national routes are part of the National Highway System, which receive some funding and strategic planning from the federal government, but are managed by the provinces.

In the United States, the U.S. Highway and Interstate Highway systems fulfil a similar role to trunk roads. However, individual states are responsible for actual highway construction and maintenance, even though the federal government helps fund these activities. The states of Michigan, Minnesota, and Wisconsin designate their highways as "state trunklines" or "(state) trunk highways".

In India they are the national highways and expressways in India. The term "trunk road" sometimes appears in the names of specific routes, most famously the Grand Trunk Road.

In China, major national roads are part of China National Highways and Expressways of China.

== See also ==
- Controlled-access highway
- Off-network tactical diversion route
- Post road
