= List of road junctions in the United Kingdom: S =

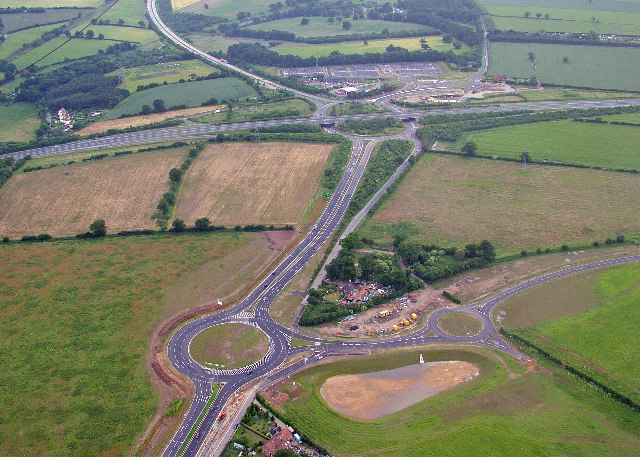
Thickthorn Interchange

This is part of the list of road junctions in the United Kingdom.

Many road junctions are named after pubs. For more information regarding the derivation of pub names see pub names.

== S ==
| Junction Name | Type | Location | Roads | Grid Reference | Notes | |
|---|---|---|---|---|---|---|
| Sacombe Pound Junction | Crossroads | Ware, Hertfordshire | A602; Sacombe Pound | TL326187 | | |
| Saddle Junction | | Wigan, Greater Manchester | B5386 Warrington Road; A577 Wallgate; A577 Ormskirk Road; A571 Victoria Street; Robin Park Road; Frith Street | SD570051 | | |
| Sadlers Hall Farm | Magic Roundabout | North Benfleet, Essex | A13; A130; B1464 London Road (formerly A13) | TQ763884 | A 'magic roundabout' next to Sadlers Hall Farm (aka Sadlers Farm) | |
| Salford Circus | Roundabout | Aston, West Midlands | A38 Tyburn Road (formerly A4097); A5127 Gravelly Hill (formerly A38); A5127 Lichfield Road (formerly A38); Slade Road | SP096902 | The old junction beneath the motorway intersection called the Gravelly Hill Interchange | |
| Saltend Roundabout | Roundabout with Flyover | Kingston upon Hull, East Yorkshire | A1033 Hull Road; Salt End Lane; Paull Road | TA166288 | | |
| Salmon's Corner | | Coggeshall, Essex | A120 Coggeshall Road; Salmon's Lane | TL884233 | | |
| Sander's Corner | | Crews Hill, LB Enfield | Cattlegate Road; Theobalds Park Road | 51°41′00″N 0°05′56″W | | |
| Sandyford Roundabout | | Prestwick, South Ayrshire | A77; B742; Sandyford Road | NS380257 | | |
| Sandy Gate | | Exeter, Devon | M5 J30; A376 Sidmouth Road; A379 (Exeter bypass); Sidmouth Road | 50°42′45″N 3°27′49″W | The A379 follows the route of the original A38 Exeter Southern Bypass. | |
| Sandy Roundabout | | Sandy, Bedfordshire | A1 High Road; A1 London Road; A603 Bedford Road; B1042 Bedford Road | 52°07′41″N 0°17′58″W | | |
| School Road Junction | | Ashford, Surrey, Surrey | A308 Staines Road; B378 School Road; Ashford Road | 51°25′23″N 0°26′56″W | | |
| Scilly Isles | | Esher, Surrey | A307 Portsmouth Road; A309 Kingston Bypass; A309 Hampton Court Way | 51°22′42″N 0°20′54″W | | |
| Scotch Corner | Roundabout Interchange | Middleton Tyas, North Yorkshire | A1(M) Great North Road; A66; A6055 Barracks Bank; Middleton Tyas Lane | 54°26′32″N 1°40′07″W | | |
| Scotch House | | Knightsbridge, London | A4 Knightsbridge; A4 Brompton Road; A315 Knightsbridge; A3216 Sloane Street | 51°30′06″N 0°09′41″W | | |
| Scotts Green Island | | Dudley, West Midlands | A461 Duncan Edwards Way; A461 Stourbridge Road; A4101 Stourbridge Road; A4101 Kingswinford Road; Scotts Green Close | 52°30′10″N 2°06′19″W | Duncan Edwards Way is named after the local football player killed in the Munich air crash. | |
| Scratchwood | | LB Barnet | M1 J3 | 51°38′06″N 0°15′58″W | Planned junction, never built. Partially built roundabout used to access Scratchwood services. | |
| Seacroft Windmill | | Seacroft, Leeds | A64 York Road; A6120 Seacroft; York Road | 53°49′22″N 1°27′23″W | | |
| Seaton Burn | | Seaton Burn, North Tyneside | A1; A19 | NZ233745 | | |
| Seaward Street | | Glasgow | M8 J21; M74 J1; Seaward Street | 55°51′00″N 4°16′42″W | | |
| Segensworth Roundabout | | Segensworth, Hampshire | A27 M27 J9 Link Road; A27 Southampton Road; Segensworth Road; Little Park Farm Road; Barnes Wallis Road | SU525079 | | |
| Selby Fork | | Ledham, West Yorkshire | A1 Great North Road; A63 Main Street; Holy Rood Lane | SE468298 | | |
| Seven Hills Interchange | | Ipswich, Suffolk | A14 J58; A12; A1156; unclass. | TM233414 | | |
| Seven Sisters | | South Tottenham, LB Haringey | A10 High Road; A503 Seven Sisters Road | 51°35′00″N 0°04′20″W | | |
| Seven Stars Corner | | Ravenscourt Park, LB Hammersmith and Fulham | A402 Goldhawk Road; B408 Askew Road | TQ223793 | | |
| Shannon Corner | | New Malden, Royal Borough of Kingston | A3 Malden Road; B282 Burlington Road | 51°23′58″N 0°14′36″W | | |
| Shenley Roundabout | | Shenley, Milton Keynes | H6 Childs Way; V3 Fulmer Street | 52°01′02″N 0°47′07″W | | |
| Shepherd and Flock | Roundabout | Farnham, Surrey | A31 Farnham By-pass; A31 Guildford Road; A325 Guildford Road; A325 Water Lane; Moor Park Lane | SU854475 | | |
| Sheriffhall | | Sheriffhall, Edinburgh, Lothian | A720 Edinburgh City Bypass; A7 Old Dalkeith Road; A7 Millerhill Road; A68 Old Dalkeith Road | 55°53′59″N 3°05′33″W | | |
| Shifnal: aka Priorslee | | Telford | M54 J4; A464 Priorslee Road; A464 Elizabeth Avenue; A4640 Castle Farm Way | 52°40′46″N 2°24′22″W | | |
| Shire Oak Junction | | Shire Oak, West Midlands | A461 Lichfield Road; A452 Chester Road | 52°38′08″N 1°55′00″W | | |
| Shoby Crossroads | | Near Shoby, Leicestershire | A6006; B676 Six Hills Lane; Six Hills Lane (unclassified) | 52°47′17″N 1°0′58″W | | |
| Silbury Roundabout | | Central Milton Keynes | V6 Grafton Gate; Silbury Boulevard | 52°02′16″N 0°46′18″W | | |
| Silent Pool Junction | | Albury, Surrey | A25 Shere Road; A248 Albury Road | TQ061484 | The Silent Pool is an adjacent beauty spot. | |
| Simister Island | | Simister, Greater Manchester | M60 J18; M62 J18; M66 J4 | 53°33′01″N 2°15′38″W | The M66 originally continued south along the present M60. | |
| Simpson Roundabout | | Simpson, Milton Keynes | H9 Groveway; V8 Marlborough Street | 52°01′02″N 0°43′27″W | | |
| Six Ashes | | Bridgnorth, Shropshire | A458; Six Ashes Road | | Toscano at Six Ashes restaurant is adjacent | |
| Six Bells | | Farnham, Surrey | A325 Hale Road; B3007 Hale Road; A325; B3007 Weybourne Road | SU850480 | | |
| Six Crossroads | | Woking, Surrey | A245 Shores Road; A245 Woodham Lane; A320 Chertsey Road; Monument Road; Woodham Road | TQ014604 | | |
| Six Hills | | Six Hills, Leicestershire | A46; B676 Six Hills Lane | 52°46′52″N 1°02′49″W | | |
| Six Hills Way Roundabout | Roundabout | Stevenage, Hertfordshire | A1070 Six Hills Way; A602 Lytton Way (formerly A1); B197 London Road (formerly A1) | 51°53′56″N 0°12′11″W | Named after the six burial mounds next to the site. | |
| Six Roads End | | Burton upon Trent, Staffordshire | A515; B5017; Holly Bush Road; Forest Road; Wood Lane | 52°50′42″N 1°46′41″W | Also known as Six Lane Ends | |
| Six Ways Roundabout | | Erdington, West Midlands | A4040 Reservoir Road; A4040 Wood End Road; A5127 Gravelly Hill North (formerly A38); A5127 Summer Road (formerly A38); B4139, High Street (original A38); Wood End Lane | SP106915 | | |
| Skeldon Roundabout | | Campbell Park, Milton Keynes | Silbury Boulevard; Skeldon Gate | 52°02′58″N 0°44′37″W | | |
| Skellow Cross | Crossroads | Skellow, South Yorkshire | Unclassified crossroads | SE537108 | | |
| Skippingdale Roundabout | | Scunthorpe, Lincolnshire | A1077 Phoenix Parkway; Luneburg Way; Holyroad Drive | 53°36′19″N 0°40′46″W | | |
| Skirsgill | | Penrith, Cumbria | M6 J40; A66; A592 Ullswater Road | 54°39′11″N 2°45′36″W | | |
| Sloane Square | | Belgravia & Chelsea, London | A3216 Sloane Street; A3217 Kings Road | 51°29′34″N 0°09′28″W | | |
| Snell's Corner | | Horndean, Hampshire | A3 London Road; Drift Road | SU707154 | | |
| Snow Hill Junction | | Wolverhampton | A4150 Ring Road; A4123 Birmingham Road; A459 Dudley Road; Snow Hill; Church Lane | 52°34′50″N 2°07′32″W | Local road signs but not maps indicate Dudley Road to be part of the A4123 gyratory system. | |
| Sorley Cross | | Sorley, south of Loddiswell, Devon | A381; B3196; unclass. | 50.3040°N 3.7869°W | | |
| South Elder Roundabout | | Central Milton Keynes | Avebury Boulevard | 52°02′0″N 0°46′18″W | | |
| South Enmore Roundabout | | Campbell Park, Milton Keynes | H6 Childs Way; Enmore Gate; Kenwood Gate | 52°02′37″N 0°44′22″W | | |
| South Grafton Roundabout | | Central Milton Keynes | H6 Childs Way; V6 Grafton Gate | 52°01′56″N 0°45′57″W | | |
| South Overgate Roundabout | | Central Milton Keynes | H6 Childs Way; V9 Overgate | 52°01′56″N 0°45′57″W | | |
| South Saxon Roundabout | | Central Milton Keynes | H6 Childs Way; V7 Saxon Gate; V7 Saxon Street | 52°02′13″N 0°45′19″W | | |
| South Secklow Roundabout | | Central Milton Keynes | H6 Childs Way; Secklow Gate; Pentewan Gate | 52°02′21″N 0°44′59″W | | |
| South Witan Roundabout | | Central Milton Keynes | H6 Childs Way; Witan Gate; Evans Gate | 52°02′05″N 0°45′38″W | | |
| Southay Cross | | Yarcombe, Devon | A30; Southay Lane; Shell's Lane | ST273091 | | |
| Southcott Cross | T junction | Chawleigh, Devon | unclass. roads to: Chawleigh N; Chenson S; Southcott / Hilltown W | 50.8901°N 3.8388°W | Named on fingerpost | |
| Southerham Roundabout | Roundabout with bypass lane, (A27 Eastbound) | Lewes, East Sussex | A27; A26 Southerham Road; A27/A26 Ranscombe Hill | TQ 42585 09188 | | |
| Southfields Roundabout | Roundabout | Horton, Somerset | A303; A358; B3168 Station Road | 50.9336°N 2.9363°W | | |
| Southgate Circus | | Southgate, LB Enfield | A1004 High Street; A111 Chase Side; A111 The Bourne; Chase Road | 51°37′57″N 0°07′39″W | | |
| Southgate Crossroads | | Barlborough, Derbyshire | A618 Rotherham Lane; A619 Chesterfield Road | 53°17′20″N 1°15′39″W | | |
Spaghetti Junction: see Gravelly Hill Interchange
| Speculation Inn Junction | | Hundleton, Pembrokeshire | B4320; Goldborough Road | 51°40′02″N 4°57′02″W | | |
| Spittals Interchange | | Huntingdon, Huntingdonshire | A14 (formerly A604); A141 Spittals Way | 52°20′24″N 0°12′29″W | | |
| Springfield Roundabout | | Springfield, Milton Keynes | H6 Childs Way; V8 (B4034) Marlborough Street | 52°02′30″N 0°44′40″W | | |
| St. Ann's Cross | | Hackforth, North Yorkshire | A1 Dere Street; Tickergate Lane; Bowbridge Lane | SE266934 | | |
| St. Dunstan's | | Cheam, LB Sutton | A217 St Dunstan's Hill; A217 Belmont Rise; A232 High Street; A232 Cheam Road | 51°21′32″N 0°12′48″W | | |
| St. George's Circus | | Southwark, London | A201; A3202; A3203 Lambeth Road | 51°29′56″N 0°06′18″W | | |
| St. George's College | | Addlestone, Surrey | A317 Woburn Hill; A317 Weybridge Road; B3121 Station Road | TQ059651 | | |
| St. George's Interchange | | Weston-super-Mare, North Somerset | M5 J21; A370 Somerset Avenue | 51°21′33″N 2°53′37″W | | |
| St. Giles' Circus | | London | A40 Oxford Street; A40 New Oxford Street; A400 Charing Cross Road; A400 Tottenham Court Road | 51°30′59″N 0°07′50″W | | |
| St. James Interchange East | Fork Interchange | Glasgow | M8 J28a; A737 | 55°51′35″N 4°26′35″W | | |
| St. James Interchange West | Roundabout Interchange | Glasgow | M8 J29; A737; A726 Barnsford Road | 55°51′31″N 4°26′59″W | | |
| St. Margaret's Roundabout | | St. Margaret's, LB Richmond | A316 Chertsey Road; A316 The Avenue; A3004 St. Margarets Road | 51°27′27″N 0°19′22″W | | |
| St Marks Roundabout | Roundabout | Worle, North Somerset | Madam Lane; St Marks Road; Queensway | | Formerly St Mark's Roundabout (2020) | |
| | St. Mary Redcliffe | | Bristol | A4 Redcliff Way; A38 Redcliff Hill; Redcliff Street | 51°26′56″N 2°35′26″W | Named after St Mary Redcliffe Church on the junction. |
| St. Owen's Cross | | Ross-on-Wye, Herefordshire | A4137; B4521 | SO539248 | | |
| Stacey Bushes Roundabout | | Stacey Bushes, Milton Keynes | H3 (A422) Monks Way; Alston Drive | 52°02′59″N 0°47′54″W | | |
| Stafford Cross | Staggered | Colyton, Devon | A3052; unclass., to Colyton; unclass. | 50.71545°N 3.11865°W | Named on approaching road sign | |
| Stafford North | Roundabout Interchange | Stafford, Staffordshire | M6 J14; A34 Beaconside; A5013 Eccleshall Road; A5013 Creswell Green | 52°49′35″N 2°08′47″W | | |
| Stafford South | | Stafford, Staffordshire | M6 J13; A449 | 52°45′49″N 2°06′27″W | | |
| Stafford Street Junction | | Wolverhampton, Staffordshire | A4150 Ring Road; A449 Stafford Street; Stafford Street (unclassified) | 52°35′21″N 2°07′37″W | | |
| Stag Gate | | Sturminster Marshall, Dorset | A31; unclass. | SY925994 | | |
| Stag Hill Roundabout | | Guildford, Surrey | A3 Middleton Road (S/B); Egerton Road; unclass. | SU981501 | | |
| Stag Lane Junction | | LB Wandsworth | A3 Roehampton Vale; Stag Lane | 51°26′21″N 0°14′55″W | | |
| Stag Roundabout | | Rotherham, South Yorkshire | A6021 Wickersley Road; A6123 Herringthorpe Valley Road | 53°25′07″N 1°19′18″W | | |
| Stagg's Folly | | Dorset | A37 Long Ash Lane; unclass. | 50°48′11″N 2°33′04″W | | |
| Stairfoot Roundabout | | Barnsley, South Yorkshire | A633 Wombwell Lane; A633 Grange Lane; A635 Doncaster Road; B6100 Hunningley Lane | 53°32′39″N 1°26′22″W | | |
| Staithgate Roundabout | | Bradford, West Yorkshire | M606; A6177 Rooley Lane; A6036 Rooley Avenue; Staithgate Lane | SE166303 | | |
| Stantonbury Roundabout | | Stantonbury, Milton Keynes | H3 (A422) Monks Way; V7 Saxon Street | 50°48′11″N 2°33′04″W | | |
| Stanton Wood Roundabout | | Bradwell Common, Milton Keynes | H4 Dansteed Way; V7 Saxon Street | 52°03′01″N 0°46′0″W | | |
| Staples Corner | Roundabout Interchange | | M1 J1; A406; A5 Edgware Road | 51°34′20″N 0°13′43″W | Named after the Staples Mattress Factory which was located on the road junction from 1926 to 1986 | |
| The Stations Roundabout | Roundabout | Redhill, Surrey | A23 Princess Way; A25 Station Road; A23 Marketfield Way; Station Road; Access road to bus station | TQ280506 | Named on road signage. | |
| Steam Mill Corner | | Bradfield, Essex | Steam Mill Road; Straight Road | TM131297 | | |
| Stepps Road Interchange | | Glasgow | M8 J11; B765 Stepps Road | 55°52′11″N 4°09′26″W | | |
| Stevens Cross | Crossroads | Sidford, Devon | A3052 Trow Hill; Fortescue Road; Harcombe Lane East | 50.70155°N 3.219°W | Named on road sign at junction | |
| Stibb Cross | | Great Torrington, Devon | A388, W / NE; B3227, E; unclass., S | 50.9125°N 4.2367°W | | |
| Stifford Interchange | | North Stifford, near Grays, Thurrock (formerly in Essex) | A13; A1012; Stifford High Road; Stifford Clays Road | TQ608803 | NB. Not officially signed. | |
| Stilwell Roundabout | | Yiewsley, LB Hillingdon | A408 Stockley Road; B465 West Drayton Road | 51°31′00″N 0°27′06″W | | |
| Stirling Corner | Roundabout | Borehamwood, Hertfordshire | A1 Barnet Bypass; A411 Barnet Lane | 51°38′36″N 0°15′17″W | | |
| Stivichall Interchange: aka Festival Island | | Stivichall (aka Styvechale), Coventry | A45 Stonebridge Highway; A46; A444 | 52°22′40″N 1°30′04″W | | |
| Stoak Interchange | | Stoak, Chester | M56 J15; M53 J11 (formerly M531) | 53°14′44″N 2°52′10″W | | |
| Stockbridge Roundabout | Roundabout | Chichester, West Sussex | A27 Chichester Bypass; Stockbridge Road; A27 Chichester Bypass; Stockbridge Road | SU 85731 03837 | | |
| Stockley Park Roundabout | | Yiewsley, LB Hillingdon | A408 Stockley Road; Horton Road; Bennetsfield Road | 51°30′42″N 0°27′0″W | | |
| Stockwitch Cross | | Podimore, Somerset | B3151; unclass. | ST557244 | | |
| Stoke Junction | | Guildford, Surrey | A3 Guildford Bypass; A320 Woking Road; A320 Stoke Road | SU998510 | | |
| Stoke Road Junction | | Stoke-on-Trent, Staffordshire | A500 Queensway; A52 Sheffield Old Road; A5006 Stoke Road | SJ877457 | | |
| Stonebridge Roundabout | | Wolverton, Milton Keynes | V6 Grafton Street; Newport Road | 52°03′58″N 0°48′05″W | | |
| Stonebridge Roundabout/Island | | Stonebridge, West Midlands | A45 Coventry Road; A45 Birmingham Road; A452 Chester Road; A452 Kenilworth Road | 52°26′44″N 1°41′14″W | | |
| Stony Stratford Roundabout | | Stony Stratford, Milton Keynes | Stratford Road; Queen Eleanor Street | 52°03′32″N 0°50′32″W | | |
| Stopgate Cross | Crossroads | Yarcombe, Honiton, Devon | A303; B3170; unclass., to Yarcombe | 50.883°N 3.0863°W | | |
| Stopgate Cross | Crossroads | Zeal Monachorum, Mid Devon | B3220; unclass., to Lapford; unclass., to Zeal Mchm | 50.8355°N 3.8110°W | Named on fingerpost | |
| Straiton | | Straiton, Edinburgh | A720 City of Edinburgh Bypass; A701 Straiton Road; A701 Burdiehouse Road | NT274669 | | |
| Streethay | | Lichfield, Staffordshire | A38; A5127 Burton Road | 52°41′31″N 1°47′22″W | | |
| Strensham Interchange | Roundabout Interchange | Strensham, Worcestershire | M5 J8; M50 | 52°02′51″N 2°08′07″W | | |
| Stump Cross | Roundabout Interchange | Great Chesterford, Cambridgeshire | M11; A11 Newmarket Road; A1301 (formerly A130); B1383 Newmarket Road (formerly A11); B184 Walden Road | 52°04′32″N 0°11′35″E | | |
| Stump Cross | Crossroads | Kelsall, Hertfordshire | Crouch Hill | 52°00′55″N 0°04′43″W | | |
| The Sun Roundabout | Roundabout | Hoddesdon, Hertfordshire | A10 spur - Dinant Link Road; A1170 Amwell St. (formerly A10); A1170 Dinant Link Road; Amwell St. (formerly A10) | 51°45′50″N 0°00′42″W | Named after the pub on the roundabout | |
| The Sun-in-the-Sands | | Blackheath, London, London | A2 Shooters Hill Road; A2 Rochester Way Relief Road; A102 Blackwall Tunnel Southern Approach | 51°28′29″N 0°01′28″E | | |
| Sunbury Cross | Roundabout | Sunbury-on-Thames, Surrey | M3 J1; A316 Country Way; A308 West Staines Road; Hanworth Road | 51°25′09″N 0°25′09″W | | |
| Sutton Cross | | Sunbury-on-Thames, Surrey | Ermine Street; Sutton Crossways | TL108989 | | |
| Swakeley's Roundabout | | Ickenham, LB Hillingdon | A40 Western Avenue; B467 Swakeley's Road; B467 Park Road | 51°33′31″N 0°28′10″W | Swakeley's House is located nearby. | |
| Swan Island | | Birmingham | A45 Coventry Road; A4040 Church Road; A4040 Yardley Road | 52°27′43″N 1°48′55″W | | |
| Swan Roundabout | | Newbury, Berkshire | A339 Basingstoke Road; B4640 (formerly A34) Newtown Road | 51°22′25″N 1°19′1″W | Named after the pub of the same name on the corner | |
| Swanley Interchange | | Swanley, Kent | M25 J3; M20 J1; A20 Swanley Bypass; A20 London Road; B2173 London Road (formerly A20) | 51°23′19″N 0°11′38″E | | |
| Swanwick Crossroads | | Swanwick, Ripley, Derbyshire | B6179 Swanwick Hill; B6179 Derby Road; B6016 The Green | 53.0750°N 1.3983°W | | |
| Swinfen | | Lichfield, Staffordshire | A38; A5206 London Road; A5148 | 52°39′47″N 1°48′56″W | | |
| Swiss Cottage | | LB Camden | A41 Finchley Road; B525 Avenue Road; B509 Adelaide Road | 51°32′33″N 0°10′28″W | | |
| Switch Island | | Sefton, Merseyside | M57 J7; M58; A59 Ormskirk Road; A5036 Dunnings Bridge Road | 53°29′38″N 2°57′10″W | | |
| Sydenham Cross | | Sydenham Damerel, Devon | unclass.; unclass. | SX407753 | | |
