= List of road junctions in the United Kingdom: G =

This is a partial list of road junctions in the United Kingdom.

Many road junctions are named after pubs. For more information regarding the derivation of pub names, see pub names.

== G ==
Junction Name	Type	Location	Roads	Grid Reference	Notes
Gabalfa Interchange: aka The Flyover		Cardiff, Wales	A48 Western Avenue; A48 Eastern Avenue; A470 North Road; A469 Whitchurch Road	ST169791	
Gailey Interchange: aka Gailey Motorway Island		Cannock, Staffordshire	M6 J12; A5	52°41′23″N 2°06′11″W	
Gailey Island		Cannock, Staffordshire	A5; A449	52°41′35″N 2°07′52″W	
Galley Hill Roundabout		Stony Stratford, Milton Keynes	H1 Ridgeway; V4 Watling Street	52°03′02″N 0°50′24″W	
Galleys Roundabout (formerly Galley's Corner)		Braintree, Essex	A120; B1018; Long Green	TL778220	
Gallions Round		Beckton, LB Newham	A117 Woolwich Manor Way; A1020 Royal Albert Way; A1020 Royal Docks Way; Armada Way; Gallions Road; University Way	51°30′29″N 0°04′13″E	
Gallows Corner	Roundabout with flyover	Romford, LB Havering	A12 Eastern Avenue; A12 Colchester Road; A118 Main Road (formerly A12); A127 Southend Arterial Road; Straight Road	51°35′34″N 0°12′45″E	
Gants Hill Cross	Roundabout	Gants Hill, LB Redbridge	A12 Eastern Avenue; A123 Cranbrook Road; A1400 Woodford Avenue (former A406); Clarence Avenue	51°34′35″N 0°03′59″E	
Ganwick Corner	Crossroads	Potters Bar, Hertfordshire	A1000 Great North Road (formerly A1); Dancers Hill Road	51°40′55″N 0°11′13″W	
Gartcosh		Glasgow	M73 J2a; B804	55°53′36″N 4°04′16″W	
Gates' Corner (former location of)	Crossroads	South Woodford, LB Redbridge	A406 Southend Road; A1199 High Rd. Woodford Green (formerly A11)	51°35′45″N 0°01′18″E	The North Circular now passes under the junction, with no vehicle access to the Woodford Green High Road. But pedestrian access has been maintained.
The George	Crossroads	South Woodford, LB Redbridge	A1199 High Road (formerly A11); B168 George Lane	TQ402904	Named after the pub on the junction. The shops at the top of George Lane are also known as the Electric Parade
George Junction		Plymouth	A386 Tavistock Road; B3432 Plymbridge Road; Southway Drive	50.4271°N 4.1130°W	
Germoe Cross Roads		Germoe, Cornwall	A394; Pengersick Lane	SW582291	
Giffard Park Roundabout		Blakelands, Milton Keynes	Wolverton Road; V10 Brickhill Street	52°04′45″N 0°44′54″W	
Gillette Corner		Brentford, LB Hounslow	A4 Great West Road; B454 Syon Lane	51°29′00″N 0°19′37″W	
Gildersome Interchange		Morley, West Yorkshire	M62 J27; M621	53°44′48″N 1°37′51″W	
Gipsy Lane Roundabout		Luton, Bedfordshire	A1081 Airport Way; A505 Gipsy Lane	51°52′10″N 0°23′50″W	
Girton Interchange	Modified Cloverleaf	Girton, Cambridgeshire	M11 J14; A14 (formerly A604); A14 (formerly A45); A1307 (formerly A604); A428 (formerly A45)	52°13′50″N 0°04′14″E	
Givons Grove Roundabout		Leatherhead, Surrey	A24 Dorking Road; A24 By-Pass Road; A246 Young Street; B2450 Dorking Road	TQ167550	
The Glanty		Egham, Surrey	A30 Egham By-pass; A308 The Glanty; B388	TQ017718	
Glasgow Airport		Glasgow	M8 J28; unclass.	55°51′43″N 4°25′58″W	webcam
Gleadless Townend		Gleadless, South Yorkshire	A6102; B6054	53°20′43″N 1°25′32″W	
Godstone Interchange		Godstone, Surrey	M25 J6; A22 Godstone By-pass; A22 Godstone Hill; B2235 Godstone Hill	51°15′34″N 0°03′54″W	
Gogar Junction		Gogar, Edinburgh	A8 Glasgow Road; A720; unclass.	NT175726	
Golden Balls Roundabout		Burcot, Oxfordshire	A4074; B4015	51°40′31″N 1°11′31″W	
Golden Fleece		Carlisle, Cumbria	M6 J42; A6; B6263	54°51′27″N 2°52′41″W	
Golds Cross		Tedburn St Mary, Devon	unclass. (formerly A30); Golds Lane; Piece Hill	SX803939	
Gonerby Moor Roundabout		Grantham, Lincolnshire	A1; B1174	52°57′00″N 0°40′46″W	
Goole Interchange		Goole, East Yorkshire	M62 J36; A614	SE721238	
Goresbrook Interchange		Dagenham, LB Barking and Dagenham	A13 Ripple Road; A13 Thames Gateway; A1306 Ripple Road (formerly A13); Choats Manor Way; Morrison Road	TQ485835	
Granby Roundabout		Granby, Milton Keynes	H10 Bletcham Way; V4 Watling Street; V6 Grafton Street	52°00′22″N 0°44′05″W	
Grange Farm Roundabout		Grange Farm, Milton Keynes	H4 Danesteed Way; V3 Fulmer Street	52°01′37″N 0°48′38″W	
Grasby Bottoms		Grasby, Lincolnshire	unclass.; Grasby Wold Lane	TA107068	
Grassyards Interchange		Kilmarnock, Ayrshire	A77; B7082; unclass.	55°37′23″N 4°28′0″W	
Gravelly Hill Interchange: aka Spaghetti Junction		Birmingham, West Midlands	M6 J6; A38(M) Aston Expressway; A38 Tyburn Road; A5127 Gravelly Hill	52°30′35″N 1°51′55″W	Spaghetti Junction is elevated above Salford Circus
Great Barr		Great Barr, West Midlands	M6 J7; A34	52°33′11″N 1°56′06″W	
The Great Cambridge Road Roundabout	Roundabout Interchange	London	A10 Great Cambridge Road; A406 North Circular Road; A111 Hedge Lane	51°36′59″N 0°05′12″W	
Great Daux Roundabout		Horsham, West Sussex	A24; A264	51°05′15″N 0°19′59″W	
Great Linford Roundabout		Neath Hill, Milton Keynes	H3 (A422) Monks Way; V9 Overstreet	52°03′49″N 0°44′53″W	
The Green, Woodford	Roundabout	Woodford, LB Redbridge	A104 Woodford New Road; A1199 High Road (formerly A11)	TQ399915	
Green Lane Roundabout		Milton Keynes	V9 Overgate; Silbury Boulevard	SP868399	
The Green Man		Bristol	A4018 Park Street; A4018 Queens Road; B4051 Park Row	51°27′21″N 2°36′15″W	Named after the statue in the middle of the roundabout
The Green Man	Roundabout Interchange	Leytonstone, LB Waltham Forest	A12 Eastway; A113 Hollybush Hill (brief section formerly A11); Leytonstone High Road (formerly A11)	51°34′18″N 0°00′57″E	Named after the Green Man Pub, Which stood one the site until the construction of the new A12 Eastway.
Greenleys Roundabout		Greenleys, Milton Keynes	H1 Ridgeway; V5 Great Monks Street	52°03′29″N 0°49′36″W	
Greenford Roundabout		Greenford, LB Ealing	A40 Western Avenue; A4127 Greenford Road	51°32′10″N 0°20′47″W	
Greengate Roundabout		Moston, Greater Manchester	A6104; B6393; unclass.	53°31′31″N 2°10′32″W	
Greenoakhill Roundabout		Uddingston, South Lanarkshire	Boghall Road, Greenoakhill Road, Greenoakhill Gate, Greenoakhill Crescent	55° 50' 30.048'' N4° 7' 2.172'' W	Links Boghall Road and The A74 to the New Village of Greenoakhill
Greymoorhill: aka Kingston Interchange		Carlisle, Cumbria	M6 J44; A7; A74; A689	54°55′49″N 2°56′47″W	
Grimston Bar		York, North Yorkshire	A64; A166; A1079; B1228	53°57′28″N 1°00′41″W	
Grovehill junction	Pile of traffic lights	Beverley	A1174; Road to Weel; 2 roads to Beverley towb centre	TA 048 397	Has 42 traffic lights
The Grove		Dulwich, LB Southwark	A205 Dulwich Common; A205 London Road; A2216 Lordship Lane	51°26′36″N 0°04′04″W	
Grove Lodge Roundabout	Roundabout	Worthing, West Sussex	A24 / A27 Warren Road; A27 Upper Brighton Road; A24 Broadwater Street West; Hill Barn Lane	TQ 14087 04966	
Gulworthy Cross		Gulworthy, Devon	A390; B3257; unclass.	50°32′03″N 04°11′33″W	
Gummow's Shop		Gummow's Shop, near Newquay, Cornwall	A3058; A3076; unclass.	SW867575	
Gunnersbury Park		Gunnersbury, LB Hounslow	A406 Gunnersbury Avenue; A4000 Gunnersbury Lane; B4491 Popes Lane	51°30′04″N 0°17′08″W	
Gunstone Cross	T junction	Crediton, Devon	unclass. roads to: Crediton E; Posbury/Tedburn St Mary S; Yeoford W	50.7800°N 3.6948°W	Named on fingerpost
Gunthorpe Bridge		Gunthorpe, Nottinghamshire	A6097 Bye Pass Road; Main Street; Trent Lane	52°59′10″N 0°59′15″W	
Gypsy Corner		Acton, LB Ealing	A40 Western Avenue; A4000 Victoria Road; A4000 Horn Lane; B4492 Park Royal Road	51°31′17″N 0°15′50″W	
