= GVH =

GVH may refer to:

- Gravelly Hill railway station, in Birmingham, England
- Großraum-Verkehr Hannover, a German transport association
- Goodbye Volcano High, a cinematic adventure game released in 2023
