= Scotch Corner =

Junction of the A1 and A66 road in North Yorkshire, England

- Interactive map of Scotch Corner

Location
- Middleton Tyas, North Yorkshire
- Coordinates: 54.4426°N 1.6690°W
- Roads at junction: A1(M); A66; A6055

Construction
- Type: Roundabout interchange
- Maintained by: National Highways

Location in North Yorkshire
Location in UK motorway network

Scotch Corner is a junction of the A1(M) and A66 trunk roads near Richmond in North Yorkshire, England. It has been described as "the modern gateway to Cumbria, the North East and Scotland", and is a primary destination signposted from as far away as the M6 motorway, 50 miles (80 kilometres) away. The name of the junction is derived from the fact that it is the point of divergence for traffic coming from London, the East Midlands and Yorkshire wishing to continue either to Edinburgh and eastern Scotland (along the A1(M)) or to Glasgow and western Scotland (by taking the A66).

== Toponym ==
The name originated from being the junction where the north–south Roman road known as Dere Street, which crossed the River Tees at Piercebridge, met the Roman road that went west through Bowes and Brough. It is where travellers to eastern Scotland (now via A1(M) and/or A68) are separated from travellers to western Scotland (now via A66 and M6/ A74(M)/M74).

== Geography ==
The A1(M) leads north towards North East England and Scotland and south towards London. The A66 leads north-west towards Penrith and the M6 motorway. There are three other exits from the junction: the A6055 road north and south, with the southbound side leading to the A6108 towards the Yorkshire Dales and Richmond. The third exit is towards Middleton Tyas and Croft-on-Tees and also provides access to the services. Other nearby locations include Gilling West and Aske Hall.

The Scotch Corner area is drained by Scorton Beck, which eventually flows into the Swale. The area to the west of the junction is drained by Gilling Beck in the Skeeby/Holme/Dalton Beck catchment, also eventually flowing into the Swale.

== History ==
The Romans were responsible for building the first roads to meet at this point and the site of the original junction is just a few hundred yards from the modern-day junction. In AD 71 the Romans took control of the area when they defeated the Brigantes, a Celtic tribe, at the Battle of Scotch Corner. (Note: Not to be confused with the 1322 Battle of Scotch Corner near Oldstead, east of Thirsk.) There was a major Roman settlement at Scotch Corner, with its own mint.

It is a landmark for planning and describing routes. For example it is around 50 miles (80 km) from Leeds, providing a useful distance for cycling events. It was used by cyclists for navigation. It was in a fox hunting district, providing a means of identifying the location when reporting events.

The £8 million Scotch Corner diversion opened in July 1971, which created a grade separated junction on the A1. Later, a £380 million upgrade of the A1 between Leeming Bar and Barton Interchange meant that the road was upgraded to three-lane motorway standard in March 2018. This created the opportunity for further archaeological investigation.

== Facilities ==
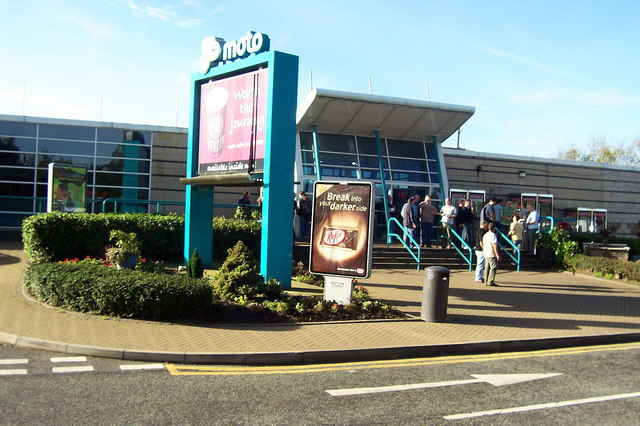
The front entrance of Moto Hospitality, Scotch Corner

The Three Tuns coaching inn stood at Scotch Corner from the 1820s. The inn subsequently became a roadhouse in the early days of motorised travel. It was demolished in 1939 when the road was widened. The Scotch Corner Hotel was established there in 1939, built on the site of a mid-16th century inn and now operated by Holiday Inn. Almost as soon as it was opened, part of the hotel was requisitioned by the Royal Air Force for convalescing airmen. In 2011 it underwent a £3 million refurbishment.

A Moto Hospitality service station opened here in 1980.

== See also ==
- List of road junctions in the United Kingdom: S
