= St Margaret's Church, Prestwich =

Coordinates: 53°32′13″N 2°16′10″W

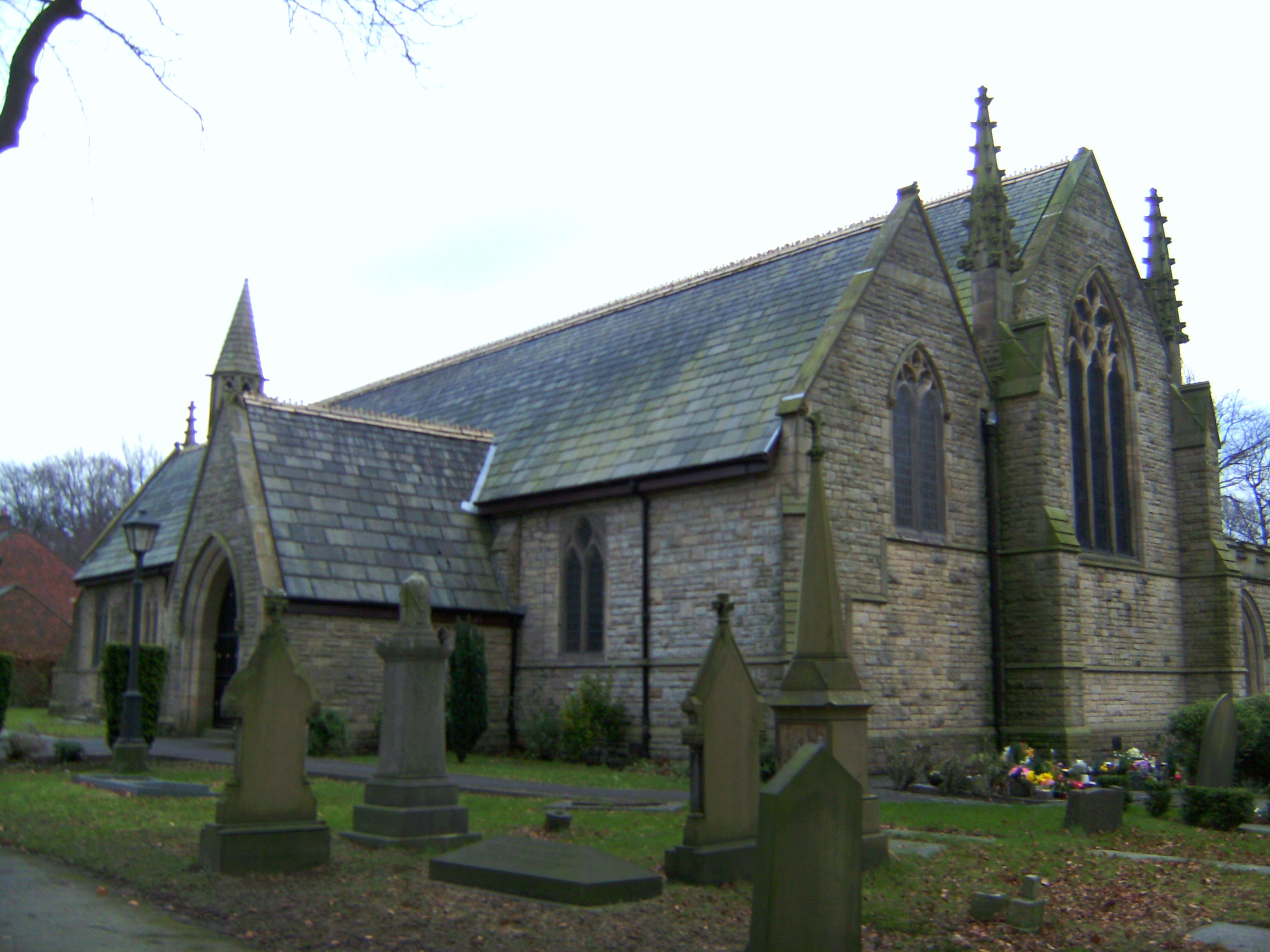
- Parish Church of St Margaret
- St Margaret's Church, Prestwich
- OS grid reference: SD 82237 04514
- Location: Prestwich, Bury, Greater Manchester
- Country: England
- Denomination: Church of England
- Website: St Margaret's Church Official Page

History
- Status: Parish church
- Dedication: St Margaret of Antioch

Architecture
- Functional status: Active
- Heritage designation: Grade II
- Designated: 9 May 2003

Administration
- Province: Province of York
- Diocese: Diocese of Manchester
- Archdeaconry: Bolton
- Deanery: Bury and Rossendale
- Parish: Holyrood, Prestwich

Clergy
- Vicar: The Revd Deborah Sandercock-Pickles
- Priest: The Revd Sue Walker

The Parish Church of St Margaret is a Church of England parish church situated on St Margaret's Road, off Bury Old Road (A665) in Prestwich, Greater Manchester, England. The Grade II listed church, in the Diocese of Manchester, was designed in the Decorated style by the Manchester architects Travis and Mangnall in 1849 as a chapel-of-ease to the ancient Prestwich Parish Church of St Mary the Virgin. Opened in 1851, it was extended in 1863, 1871, 1884, 1888 and 1899, and is notable for its fine Arts and Crafts wood carvings by Arthur Simpson of Kendal and late twentieth-century fittings. The church's daughter church of St George, Simister, is in the same parish.

== History ==
=== Foundation ===
In the early years of Queen Victoria's reign, the population of Prestwich was growing at an unprecedented rate, having risen from 470 in 1714 to 5,152 by 1849. The site of St Margaret's was given by the 2nd Earl of Wilton, the first of many gifts the Earl was to make to the young church over the latter half of the century. In 1884 the great west window, depicting the Parable of the Good Samaritan was erected by the parishioners to his memory. The name of the new church was chosen after the rejection of the original suggestion of St Thomas (arising from a desire to pay a compliment to Thomas, Earl of Wilton). Eventually the dedication of St Margaret of Antioch, Virgin Martyr was selected. At one time, there had been a chantry in Prestwich Parish Church dedicated to St Margaret the Virgin.

The foundation stone was laid by the Duchess of Cambridge in the presence of many dignitaries on 3 October 1849, following a preliminary service at the Prestwich Parish Church, documented by extensive newspaper reports. The church was opened for Divine Service on 26 October 1851 and consecrated on 18 March 1852.

St Margaret's was a Commissioners' church costing about £2,000 (equivalent to £240,000 in 2025) to build, towards which the Church Building Commission gave a grant of £200.

=== A new parish ===
In 1875, parishioners affiliated to St Margaret's presented a petition to the Bishop to request that the church be licensed for marriages, and a licence for Holy Matrimony was duly granted. After extensions in 1863 and 1871, a new organ was added in 1884, and the organ chamber enlarged to accommodate it. At the same time a new porch was built.

In 1885 St Margaret's achieved the dignity of a separate parish, under an Order in Council issued by Queen Victoria on 19 May. The Curate-in-Charge, the Revd. Stanley Swinburne, was inducted and installed as the first Vicar.

In 1888, another vestry was added, this being for the use of the choir. In 1899, the church achieved its current size with a significant extension in commemoration of Queen Victoria's Diamond Jubilee.

In the same year, Mr Benjamin Carver, another great benefactor of the church and its first Vicar's Warden, presented the church with the plot of land lying between it and Bury Old Road to the west, which he later opened as the St Margaret's Church Gardens. A memorial cross now stands in the gardens to commemorate his generosity.

=== Arthur Simpson ===
In 1899 Edward Holt, of the Holt family of brewers, began the process of enriching St Margaret's with beautiful carved oak work by the Kendal craftsman, Arthur Simpson, with a gift of new choir stalls designed by Dan Gibson. Over the following 21 years, the church was enhanced with a new high altar, reredos, panelling, bishop's throne, rood screen, war memorial and other items, largely designed by Gibson and made by Simpson. This outstanding Arts and Crafts work, believed to be the best example of Simpson's ecclesiastical work, creates a superb liturgical setting.

=== Twentieth century ===
In 1900 the population of Prestwich was 12,839, and the increased population required further burial space. This was acquired in 1909, when land on the opposite side of St Margaret's Road from the church was purchased from the Rector of Prestwich and consecrated. It is now known as the New Churchyard. In 1910, the Church House was built opposite the church, and was dedicated by the Rector of Prestwich and opened by Mr Carver on 12 November that year. It was extended in the 1950s, and the interior was significantly altered in 2005. It continues to be used for parochial purposes.

In order to care better for the Simister end of the parish, a new church was designed by R. Basnett Preston in a combination of Romanesque and vernacular revival styles and built in 1915 on a site given by the V Earl of Wilton in Nutt Lane, Simister. Built as a chapel-of-ease to St Margaret's and dedicated to St George the Martyr, it has the distinction of being the only church in the Diocese of Manchester begun and completed during the Great War, and has altered little since.

In March 1932, the Revd. T. R. Musgrave was inducted as fourth vicar of St Margaret's. He significantly altered the style of worship at St Margaret's, created a Children's Corner in the south aisle in 1932, and in Advent 1936 added a second Altar in the north aisle for use at the daily services. The Chapel was dedicated to the Blessed Virgin Mary.

In 1951 St Margaret's celebrated its centenary with a year of festivities and special observances. In 1960 the south-west porch, built in 1899, was converted into a columbarium for the interment of the cremated remains of the dead. Subsequently, two Garden of Remembrance were added to the Churchyard: at the west end of the church in the 1990s, and at the east end in 2007. In the 1960s, changing liturgical ideas in the wake of the Second Vatican Council and the Liturgical Movement prompted alterations in the church's worshipping life, such as the combination of the Sung Eucharist and Sung Matins on Sunday mornings.

In the late 1960s, provision for the young people of the parish was substantially improved by the building of a new Youth Centre and a Scout and Guide Headquarters. In 2005, these were replaced by a two-storey Youth and Community Centre on the same site.

=== Restoration ===
In February 1985 the church was damaged by arson, when the 1884 Foster and Andrews organ, the Lady Chapel and a number of other fittings were completely destroyed. The ensuing restoration, by E. G. Thorne, included the complete renewal of even those parts of the building which had not been directly affected by the fire. At the same time, changes in liturgical worship made it convenient to move the High Altar from the east end to a new bay in the chancel, and remove the old chancel screen to the west end of the church, where it lent greater dignity to a new baptistery area, created in a more central location with a new marble font at its centre. During the eighteen months during which the church was completely out of action, the congregation used the Church House for worship. The church was rehallowed by Bishop Stanley Booth-Clibborn on 8 September 1986.

In 1993, the old vicarage was sold and replaced with a newer, smaller building erected on part of the former garden.

The process of restoration included the commissioning of contemporary artworks. In 1986 the Ilkley artist Graeme Willson painted a great Crucifixion suspended over the nave altar, followed in 1994 by the Madonna of the Passion in the Lady Chapel and a chalice and host on the aumbry door. In 1998, Willson designed a font cover, carved in Dick Reid's York workshop, and in 2004 an embroidered banner depicting the church's patron saint. A vertical memorial beam carved by Charles Gurrey of York, bearing in red lettering the words "I am among you as one who serves", was added near the columbarium in 2010. New vestments have been commissioned from Philip Manser and Richard Luzar.

The organ was installed in 1986 by Nicholson & Co. Parts are from an earlier organ built in 1891 by Harrison of Durham for Hick Lane Wesleyan Chapel in Batley, sold to Prestwich Hospital chapel in 1956. The inaugural recital was given by Dr Allan Wicks, of Canterbury Cathedral, in 1987. In 2010 the organ was renovated, and the Choir Division extended, by A. J. Carter of Wakefield.

In 2001-2 the church celebrated its sesquicentenary.

== Churchyard ==
The Churchyard Extension contains the war graves of 27 service personnel, 11 of World War I and 16 of World War II.

== Vicars of St Margaret's Prestwich ==
Prior to 1885, the church was cared for a number of Curates-in-Charge, the last of whom, appointed in 1871, became the first vicar upon the creation of the parish.

1885 — 1892 The Revd Stanley Swinburne
1892 — 1926 The Revd Joseph Herbert Kidson
1927 — 1932 The Revd George Stephen Osborn
1932 — 1939 The Revd Thomas Randolph Musgrave
1939 — 1959 The Revd Cecil Rhodes Ball
1960 — 1982 The Revd Canon David Nigel Astley Clegg
1983 — 2006 The Revd Martin Ashworth
2007 — 2014 The Revd Canon Deborah A. Plummer (priest-in-charge)
2015 — 2022 The Revd Deborah Sandercock-Pickles (priest-in-charge)

The seventh vicar, the Revd Martin Ashworth, retired on 31 July 2006. In September 2006 the Bishop of Manchester suspended the patron's right of presentation to the living. The Revd Deborah Plummer, then associate vicar and lecturer of Bolton Parish Church, was appointed priest-in-charge, and she was licensed to the cure on 9 July 2007.

== See also ==
- Listed buildings in Prestwich
- List of Commissioners' churches in Northeast and Northwest England
