= Gravelly Hill =

Area of Birmingham, England

Coordinates: 52°30′46″N 01°51′07″W

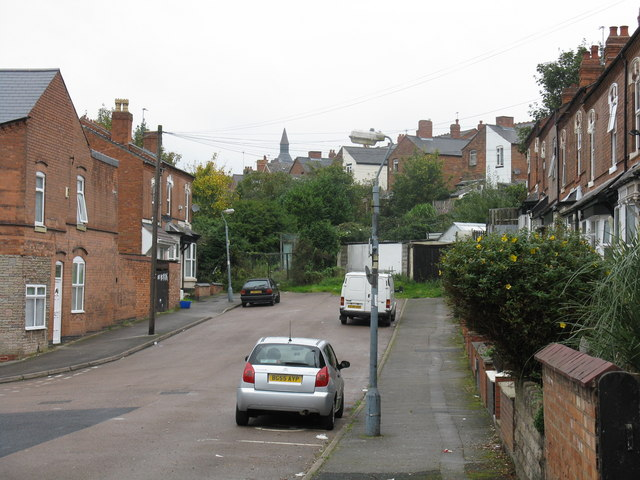
Terraced street near Gravelly Hill station

Gravelly Hill is an area of Birmingham, England.

== Location ==
Gravelly Hill is approximately four miles north-east of Birmingham city centre. To the north-west is Perry Barr and to the north-east are Stockland Green, Erdington and Sutton Coldfield. Aston is to the west and Washwood Heath lies to the south. The housing in the area is mostly Victorian and pre-war with some recent developments of modern apartments. Housing in the area is popular with students (particularly those attending Aston University), given its good transport links to the main campus.

== Spaghetti Junction ==
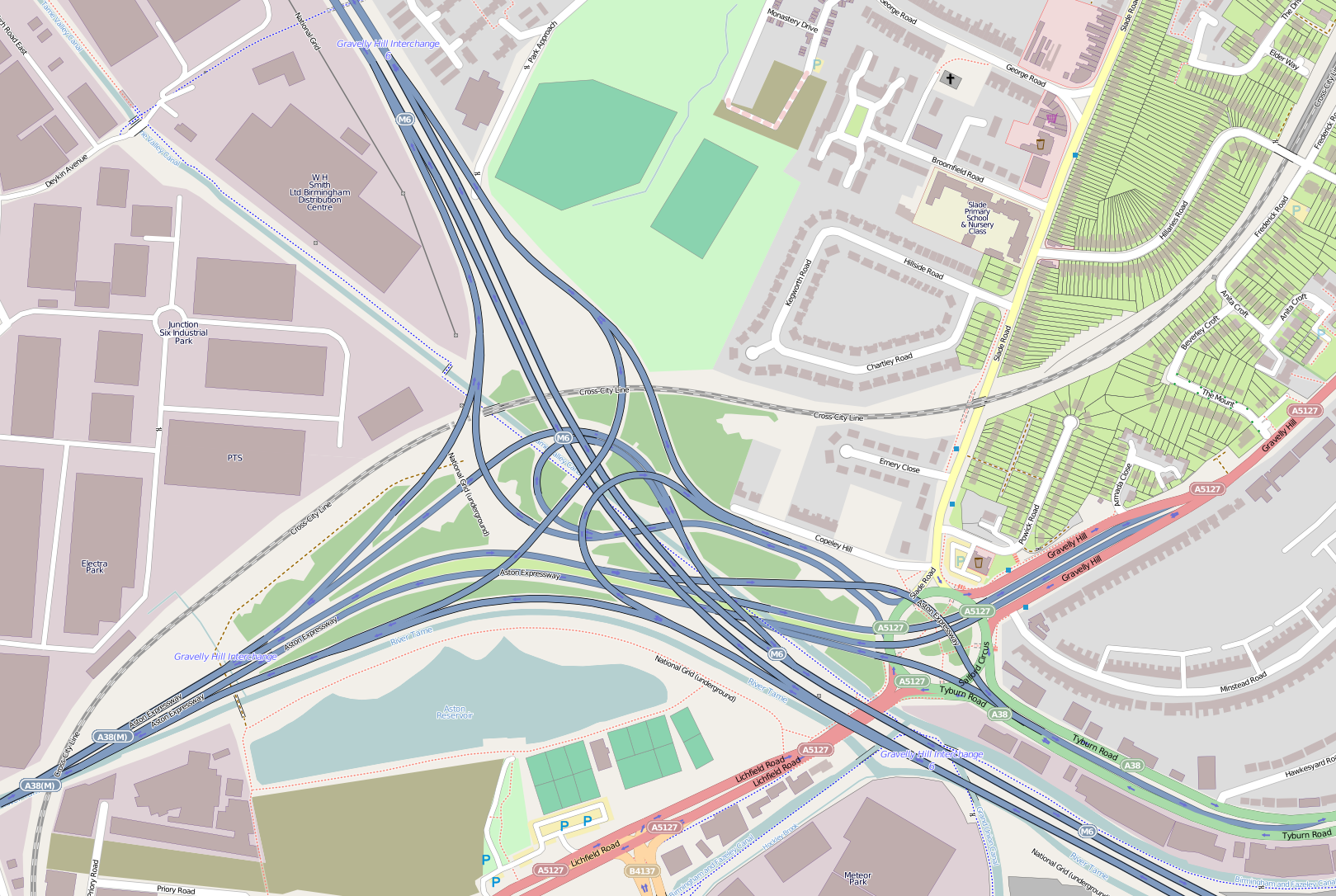
Gravelly Hill Interchange, with the Gravelly Hill area to the northeast of it

The Gravelly Hill Interchange, also known as Spaghetti Junction, provides the intersection between the A38(M) Aston Expressway from the centre of Birmingham to the M6 motorway. The complex junction also supports local roads joining the two motorways. The design of the intersection was further complicated by the presence of two railway lines including a high speed electrified railway and the existence of three canals including a turning basin, and two rivers.

== Industry ==
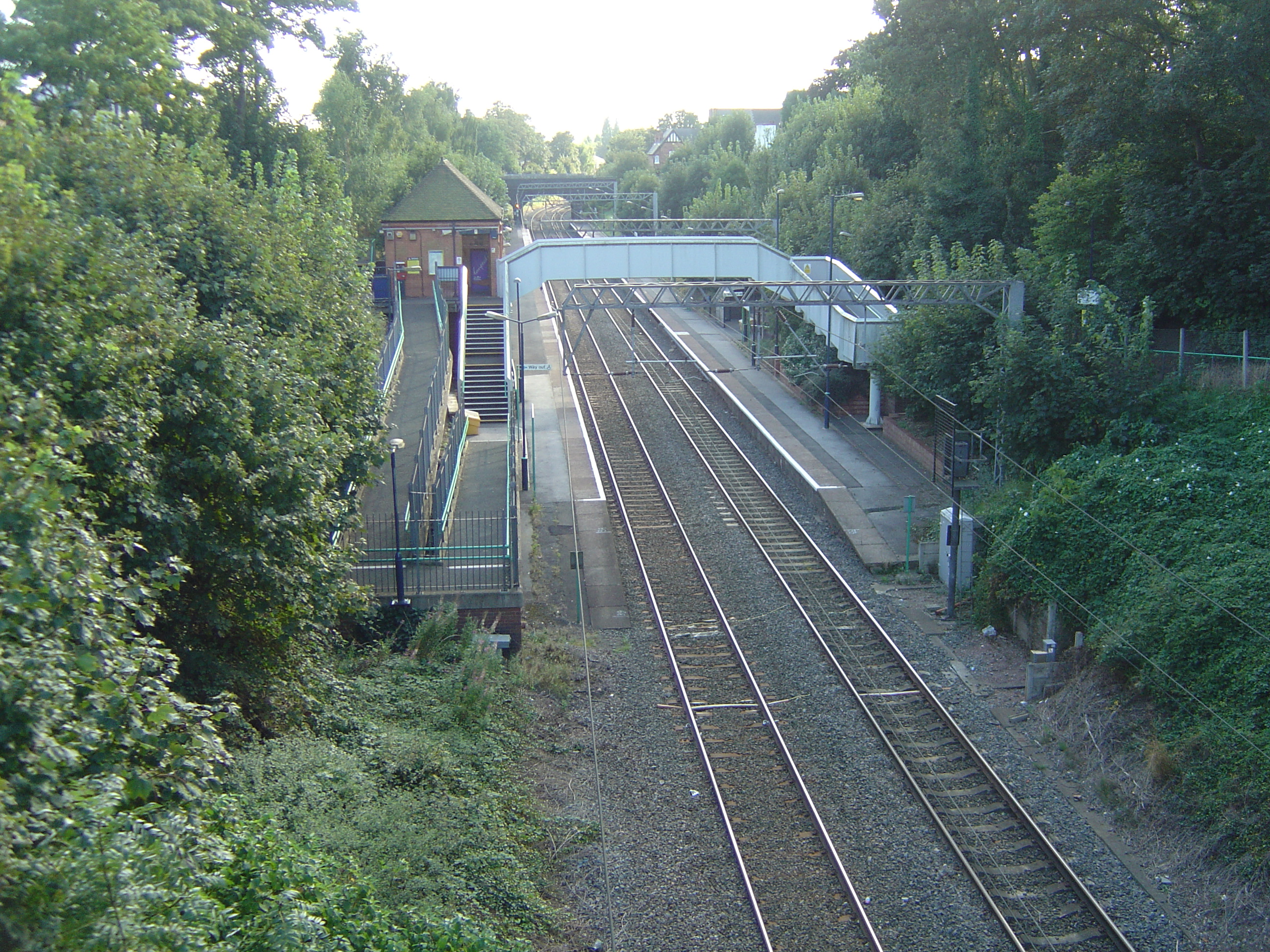
Gravelly Hill station

The area has a number of industrial units in variable conditions. One of them, Gravelly Industrial Park, is among the city's largest industrial estates. Companies with units in the park include Carlsberg, which distributes to regional accounts and national depots.

Gravelly Hill railway station is part of the Cross-City Line.

== Local government ==
Gravelly Hill is a ward of Birmingham City Council; until 2018 it was part of Stockland Green ward. However, it was previously a ward in its own right and also formed part of the Erdington Constituency. The ward is currently represented by Labour Co-op councillor Mick Brown.

The previous ward was occasionally won by the Conservatives, with the mother of current Conservative Councillor for Erdington, Robert Alden, narrowly losing the seat in 1976 elections. Alden's father was parliamentary candidate in 1975-79 for the area, gaining one of the largest swings in the country in 1979.
