= Simister =

Coordinates: 53.549°N 2.247°W

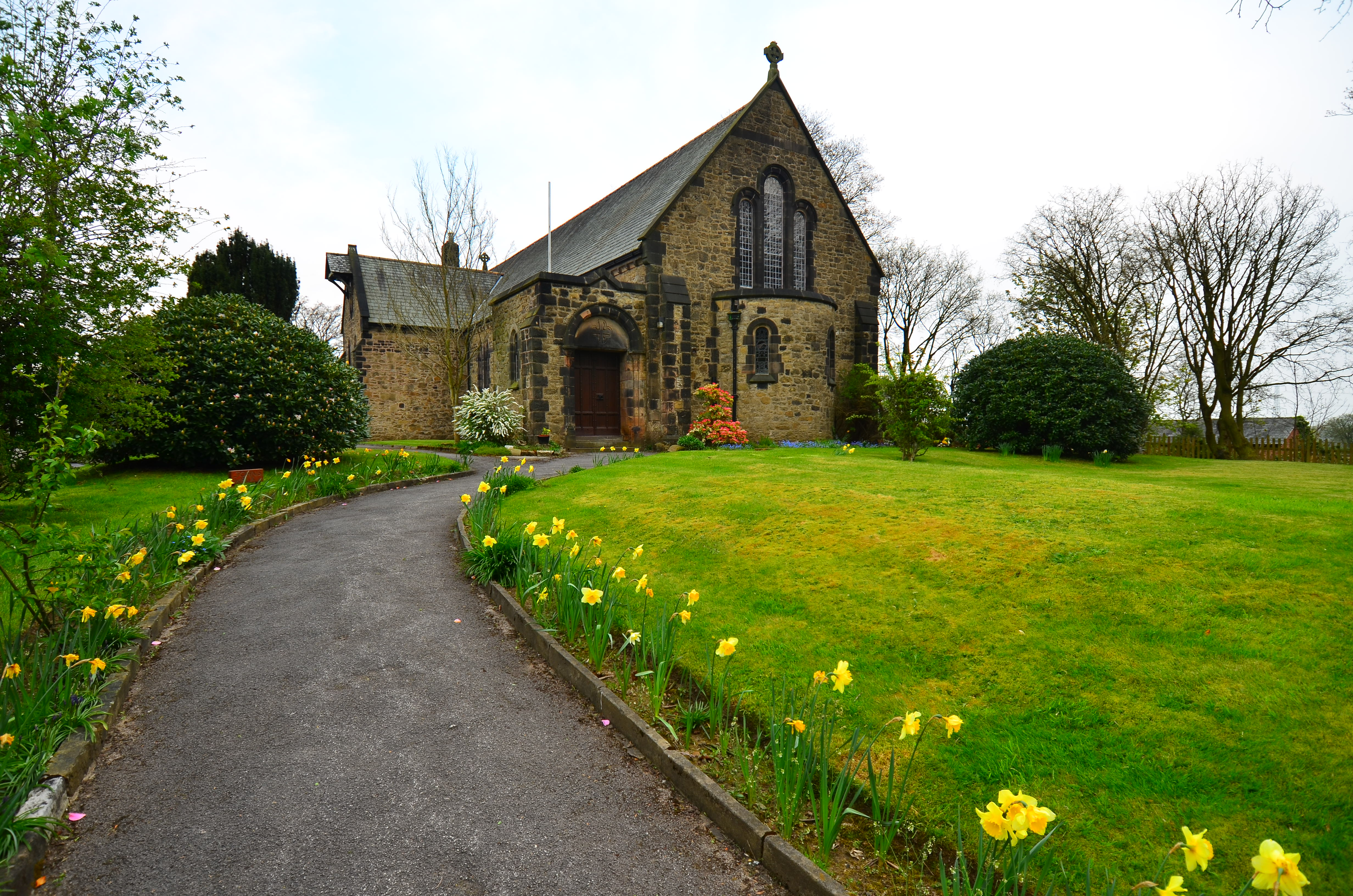
- St George's Church was built during the First World War and opened in October 1915

- Location within Greater Manchester
- Area: 0.225 km^{2} (0.087 sq mi)
- Population: 650
  - Density: 2,889/km^{2} (7,480/sq mi)
- OS grid reference: SD836058
  - London: 226 kilometres (140 mi) South east
- Metropolitan borough: Bury
- Metropolitan county: Greater Manchester
- Region: North West
- Country: England
- Sovereign state: United Kingdom
- Post town: MANCHESTER
- Postcode district: M25
- Dialling code: 0161
- Police: Greater Manchester
- Fire: Greater Manchester
- Ambulance: North West
- UK Parliament: Bury South

Simister is a small suburb in the Metropolitan Borough of Bury, Greater Manchester, England. Historically part of Lancashire, it is located between the districts of Prestwich, Rhodes and Langley. Although the village's proximity to Manchester means the residential population is mainly made up of commuters, the village has a rural feel with much agricultural activity.

== Transport ==
The village is located east of Simister Island, a major motorway interchange linking the M62, M66 and M60 motorways. Thousands of vehicles use this interchange daily, and the traffic noise is often regarded as a nuisance, though it is not considered a part of the village by residents. The main thoroughfare, Simister Lane, is frequently used as a rat run by cars travelling to and from Prestwich, Middleton and junction 19 of the M60.

== Amenities ==
The Simister Village Community Association, formed in 2000, was in 2010 developing a 10-acre wetland site. It has installed stone paths at a cost of £30,000 funded by grants from bodies such as "Big Lottery, Breathing Spaces" and "Greening Greater Manchester", as well as physical support from the borough council, the British Trust for Conservation Volunteers (BTCV) and local residents. Woodland maintenance will be carried out during the winter using further grants.

The unusual Grade II listed St George's Church, on Nutt Lane, was designed by R. Basnett Preston in a combination of Romanesque and vernacular revival styles. A daughter church of St Margaret's, Prestwich, it was built during the First World War and opened on 14 October 1915.

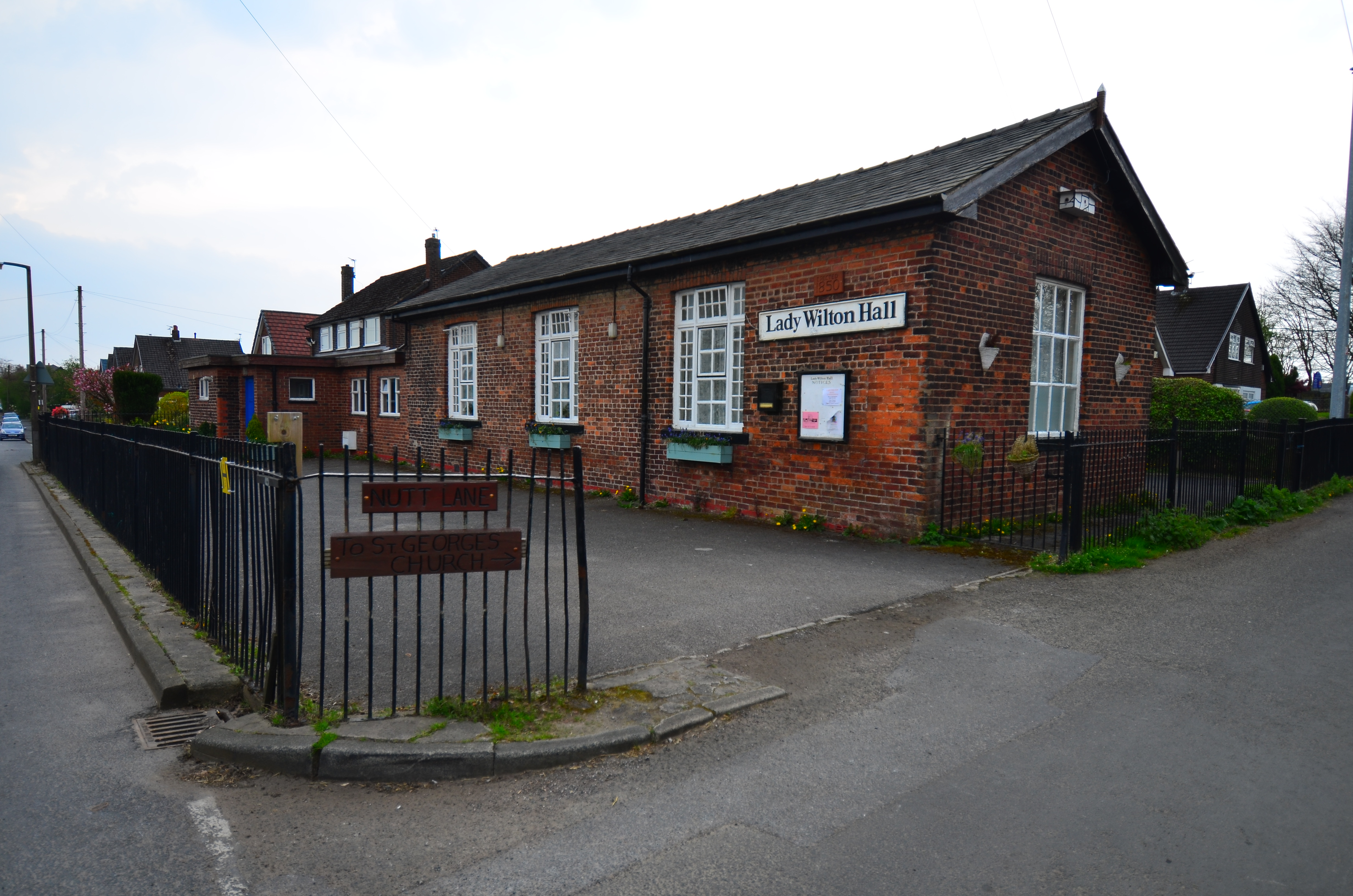
The Hall was also the village school from 1850 until 1972, it was built by the Mary, Countess of Wilton.

The Lady Wilton Hall, on Simister Lane, was built in 1850 at the sole expense of the Earl and Countess of Wilton, and housed the village school until the 1970s. Used for worship in the village prior to the construction of the church, as well as for the Sunday school, it continues to function as the church hall and is owned by the Parochial Church Council of St Margaret's.

There are also two public houses in the village, "The Farmers Arms" and "The Same Yet" both pubs are J W Lees houses.

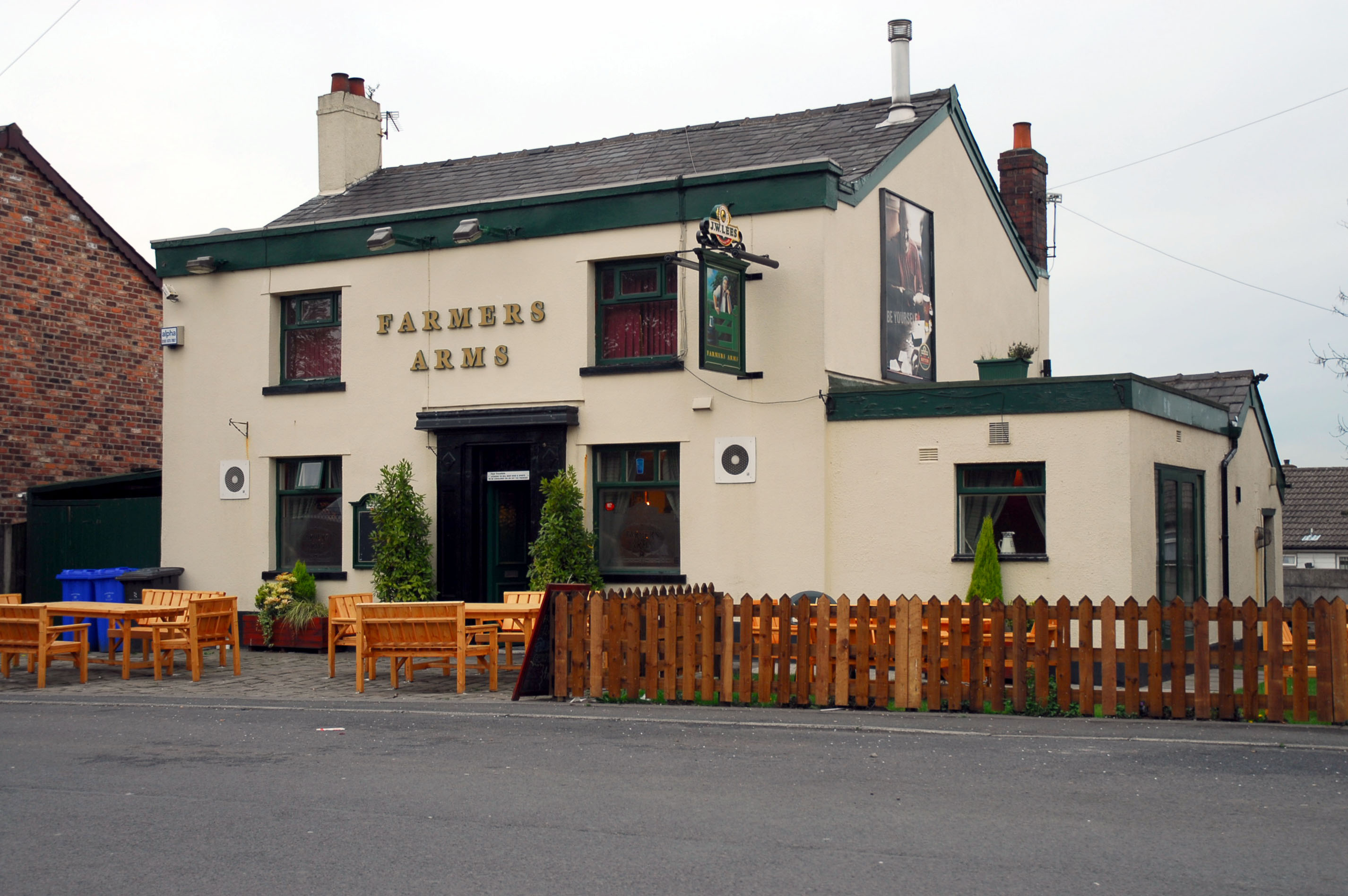
The Farmers Arms.

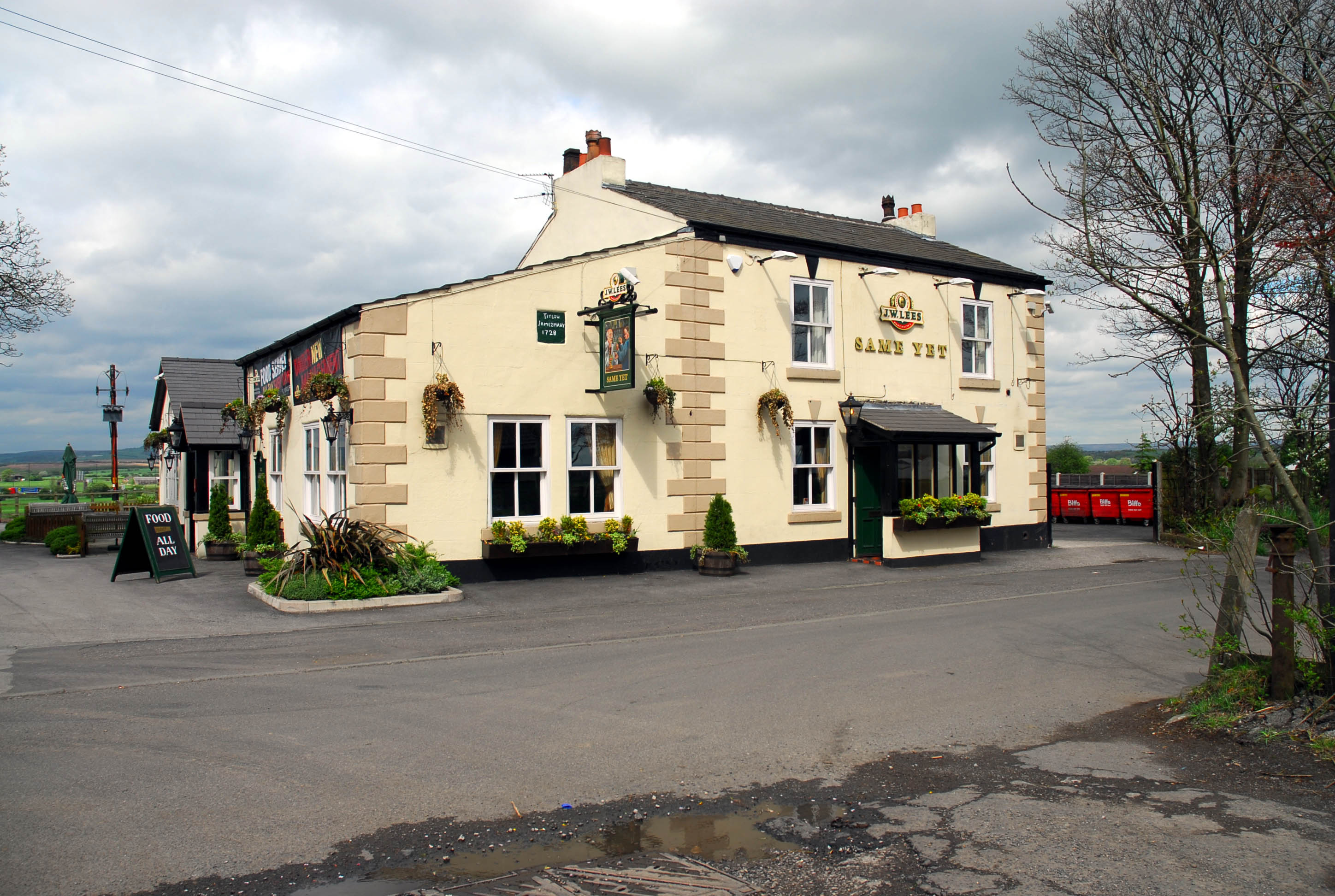
The Same Yet.

== History ==
In August 2022, The Man Who Dreamt of Stars was filmed in the village. It was produced by award-winning director Peter Adamson. Locations included The Same Yet Inn, as well as the bus stop opposite The Farmer's Arms.
