= Simister Island =

Motorway interchange in Greater Manchester, England

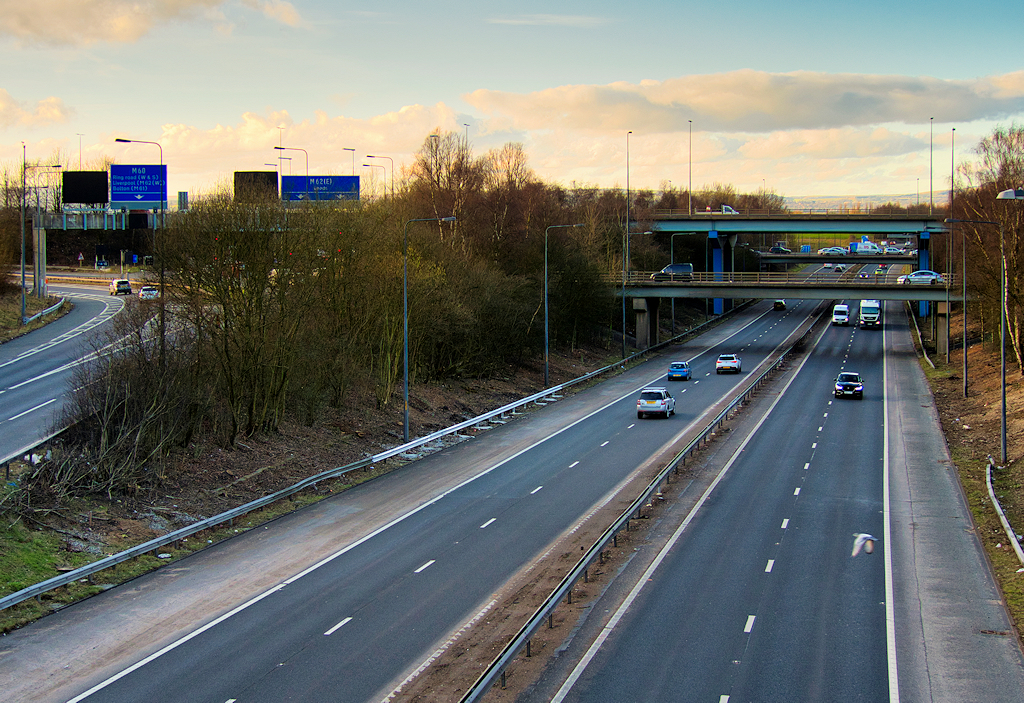
- Simister Island in 2021
- Greater Manchester
- Interactive map of Simister Island

Location
- Simister, Greater Manchester, England
- Coordinates: 53.54982°N 2.26061°W
- Roads at junction: M60; M62; M66

Construction
- Type: Multi-level motorway interchange
- Opened: 1971 (original layout)
- Maintained by: National Highways

Simister Island is a major interchange at junction 18 of the M60 motorway in the Metropolitan Borough of Bury, Greater Manchester, England. It is approximately 8 miles (13 km) north of Manchester city centre and about 3 miles (4.8 km) south of Bury, near the village of Simister. The interchange connects three key routes: the M60 orbital, the M62 trans-Pennine route, and the M66 motorway, serving as a critical hub for both regional and national traffic.

It is one of the busiest motorway junctions in North West England, handling approximately 90,000 vehicles per day. The interchange plays an important role in linking Greater Manchester with Lancashire, Yorkshire, and beyond. However, it has long been associated with severe congestion, unreliable journey times, and safety concerns due to traffic volumes far exceeding its original design capacity. To address these issues, a major upgrade has been approved, including new free-flow links, carriageway widening, and improved connectivity, with construction expected to begin after March 2026.

== History ==
Simister Island was constructed in 1970–71 as part of the development of the M62 motorway, which provided a key east–west link across the Pennines. It opened in 1971 as a two-level roundabout designed to accommodate future connections to the planned Bury Easterly Bypass (now the M66). At the time, traffic volumes were modest, and the layout reflected the standards of the era, with limited free-flow links and reliance on signal-controlled movements.

By the late 1990s, traffic growth had far exceeded the junction's original capacity. The creation of the M60 orbital motorway incorporated Simister Island into the ring road network, greatly increasing its strategic importance. In 1999 the interchange was upgraded with free-flow slip roads for all left-turn movements, a widened four-lane circulatory carriageway, and colour-coded spiral markings to guide vehicles through the newly signal-controlled junction. Despite these improvements, the layout continued to struggle with rising demand, resulting in chronic congestion and safety concerns.

The need for improvements was first identified in the Route Based Strategy Evidence Report (2014). In March 2020, the UK Government's Road Investment Strategy 2 (RIS2) committed to upgrading the junction.

Two potential improvement options were considered:

- Inner Links: This proposal focused on modifying the existing roundabout by widening the circulatory carriageway and slip roads, converting the hard shoulder to a live lane between junctions 17 and 18, and upgrading signals and signage. While it would have improved capacity, it relied on signal-controlled movements and complex lane arrangements, offering limited long-term benefits.
- Northern Loop: This option introduced a new free-flow link between the M60 northbound and westbound, reducing reliance on the roundabout and improving journey time reliability. National Highways concluded that Northern Loop provided greater capacity, better safety, and less disruption during construction, making it the preferred option.

The scheme was classified as a Nationally Significant Infrastructure Project (NSIP) under the Planning Act 2008, requiring a Development Consent Order (DCO). The DCO application was submitted in April 2024, examined between September 2024 and March 2025, and approved by Heidi Alexander, the Secretary of State for Transport, on 9 September 2025. This decision followed extensive environmental assessments, statutory consultations, and local authority engagement.

== Future development plans ==
The approved upgrade at Simister Island will involve several major interventions to improve traffic flow and capacity. A key feature is the Northern Loop construction, which will introduce a new free-flow link from the M60 eastbound to the M60 southbound, bypassing the current roundabout. This will include the construction of the Pike Fold Viaduct, designed to carry traffic over existing infrastructure.

Additional free-flow links will also be created, including a two-lane connection from the M60 northbound to the M60 westbound, replacing the existing single-lane link. To accommodate growing traffic volumes, the M60 between junctions 17 and 18 will be widened to five lanes in each direction, with the hard shoulder converted into a permanent traffic lane. The M66 southbound will also be realigned and expanded to four lanes through the interchange, improving connectivity for traffic heading toward Manchester.

Alongside these major works, ancillary improvements will include upgraded signage, drainage systems, and environmental mitigation measures to reduce noise and air quality impacts on nearby communities.

The scheme is anticipated to provide economic benefits by facilitating development within Atom Valley, a strategic growth area in Rochdale and Bury. It is projected to enable up to 20,000 jobs, support the delivery of approximately 7,000 homes, and contribute an estimated £1 billion to the regional economy.

Although planning consent has been granted, construction is expected to begin after March 2026, following confirmation in the next Road Investment Strategy. The build phase is anticipated to last approximately two years, with completion projected around 2028.

=== Public opinion ===
The proposed upgrade has generated mixed reactions among local communities and stakeholders. Many residents and businesses welcome the improvements, citing the potential for reduced congestion, improved journey times, and economic growth. Supporters argue that the scheme is essential for unlocking development opportunities in the region, including the Atom Valley Mayoral Development Zone.

However, concerns have also been raised about the project's environmental impact and whether it will fully resolve traffic issues. Residents in nearby areas such as Prestwich, Whitefield, and Simister have expressed worries about increased noise and air pollution, despite planned mitigation measures including noise barriers and air quality monitoring. Questions have also been posed about whether the upgrade could shift congestion onto local roads rather than eliminating it entirely.

The estimated cost of £207–£340 million has sparked debate over value for money, with some suggesting that investment in public transport might offer a more sustainable solution. Additionally, because construction is scheduled to begin after March 2026 and finish around 2028, there have been calls for interim measures to ease congestion before the full upgrade is delivered.

== See also ==
- Smart motorway
- Transport in Manchester
