= Gravelly Hill railway station =

Railway station in the West Midlands, England

Gravelly Hill
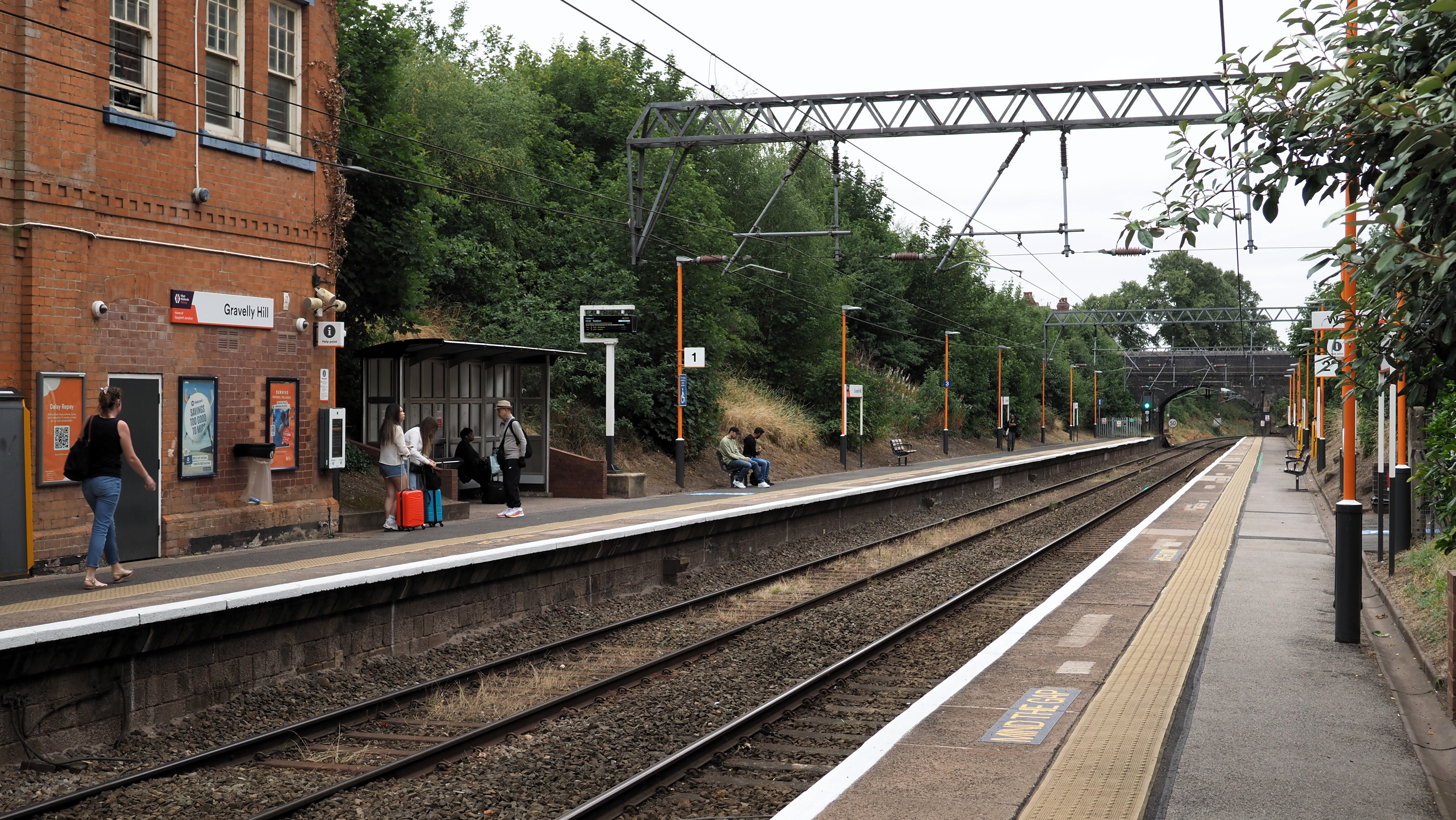
- Gravelly Hill station pictured in 2025

General information
- Location: Gravelly Hill, Birmingham; England
- Coordinates: 52.515°N 1.853°W
- Grid reference: SP100908
- Manager: West Midlands Railway
- Transit authority: Transport for West Midlands
- Platforms: 2

Other information
- Station code: GVH
- Fare zone: 2
- Classification: DfT category E

Key dates
- 1862: Opened
- 1992: Electrification

Passengers
- 2021/22: ▲0.279 million
- 2022/23: ▲0.357 million
- 2023/24: ▲0.384 million
- 2024/25: ▲0.390 million
- 2025/26: ▲0.422 million
Location
Notes
- Passenger statistics from the Office of Rail and Road

Gravelly Hill railway station that serves the Gravelly Hill area of Birmingham, England. It is situated on the Cross-City Line between Bromsgrove/Redditch and Lichfield Trent Valley.

== History ==
Opened in 1862, the station was built by the London and North Western (LNWR) railway company on their line between Birmingham and Sutton Coldfield. The only remaining original feature is the booking office building, which is unusual in having 2 storeys, and having access to the ticket office via the upper level. Other buildings and an early wooden footbridge were removed with the electrification of the Cross City line in 1992 by British Rail. The waiting areas on the platforms were replaced by modern "bus shelter" type structures on each platform. The footbridge was replaced by a modern metal structure.

== Facilities ==
=== Access for disabled passengers ===
There are ramps providing step-free access to both platforms and to the ticket office from the Hunton Hill entrance to the station.

Gravelly Hill has been classified as a step-free access category B1 station. This means that there is step-free access to all platforms, but that this may include long or steep ramps, as is the case here.

== Services ==
The station is served by West Midlands Trains with local Transport for West Midlands branded "Cross-City" services, operated using Class 730 Electric multiple units (EMUs).

The off-peak service pattern is as follows:

Mondays to Saturdays:

- 4tph northbound to Four Oaks via Sutton Coldfield, departing from Platform 2.
  - Of which:
    - 2tph continue to Lichfield Trent Valley via Lichfield City.
- 4tph southbound to Longbridge via Birmingham New Street and University, departing from Platform 1.
  - Of which:
    - 2tph continue to Redditch via Alvechurch, calling at all stations.
    - 2tph continue to Bromsgrove calling at all stations except Duddeston, 1tph does not call at Barnt Green.

Sundays:

- 2tph northbound to Lichfield Trent Valley.
- 2tph southbound to Redditch.

Services on Sundays call at all stations between Lichfield T.V. and Redditch.

The average journey time to Birmingham New Street is around 11 minutes.

Preceding station	National Rail	Following station
Aston towards Bromsgrove or Redditch	West Midlands Railway Cross-City Line	Erdington towards Lichfield Trent Valley
