= A5127 road =

Road in the West Midlands, England

A5127

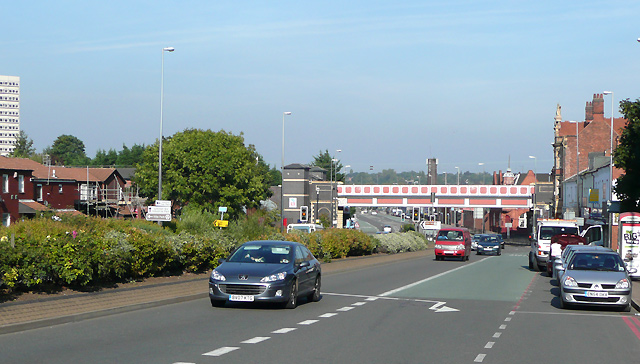
- The A5127, Lichfield Road in Aston

Location
- Country: United Kingdom
- Constituent country: England

Road network
- Roads in the United Kingdom; Motorways; A and B road zones
← A5126	→ A5128

The A5127 is a major road in England which runs between Birmingham and Lichfield, Staffordshire. For much of the route the road follows the old route of the A38 which has since been moved in order to by-pass places such as Erdington and Sutton Coldfield and form a relief road from Birmingham city centre to Spaghetti Junction.

The part from the county boundary, through Shenstone to Lichfield was one of the roads of the Lichfield Turnpike Trust, established in 1729. Beyond Lichfield, it joins the Roman Ryknild Street at Streethay and immediately after that joins the present A38.

== Route ==
Main places and junctions along the A5127:

- Birmingham
- Aston, Birmingham
- A38(M) Aston Expressway Junction (52.49234°N 1.88857°W)
- M6 motorway Junction 6 (Gravelly Hill Interchange / Spaghetti Junction; 52.50941°N 1.85938°W)
- Gravelly Hill, Birmingham
- Erdington, Birmingham (52.52457°N 1.84049°W)
- A452 Chester Road junction (52.53345°N 1.82903°W)
- Wylde Green, Birmingham
- Sutton Coldfield, Birmingham (52.56507°N 1.82236°W)
- Passes near Sutton Park
- A453 Tamworth Road junction (52.57107°N 1.82308°W)
- A454 junction (52.57893°N 1.82947°W)
- Four Oaks, Birmingham
- Birmingham & West Midlands/ Staffordshire boundary (52.60696°N 1.83815°W)
- Shenstone, Staffordshire
- Wall junction with M6 Toll (52.64555°N 1.83432°W), A5 and A5148 (leading to A38)
- A461/ A51 Junction (52.67609°N 1.83145°W)
- Lichfield, Staffordshire
- A38 Junction (52.69270°N 1.78813°W)

This route closely follows the Cross-City Line.
