= A38(M) motorway =

Motorway in Great Britain

A38(M)
- Aston Expressway
- A38(M) highlighted in blue
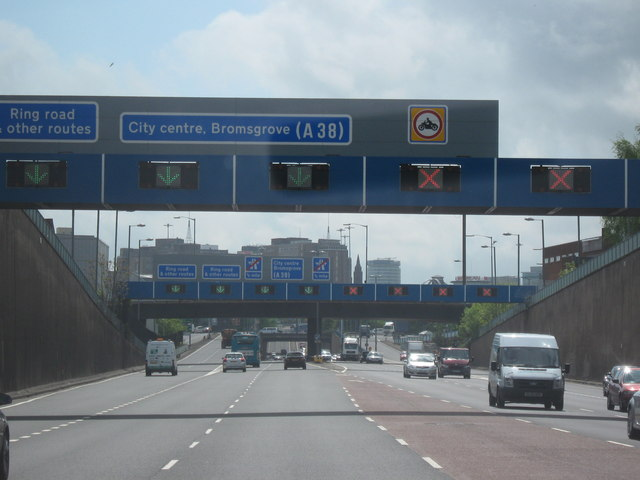
- The southern end at Birmingham city centre, 2009

Route information
- Maintained by Birmingham City Council
- Length: 2.0 mi (3.2 km)
- Existed: 1972–present
- History: Opened and completed: 1972

Major junctions
- North end: Gravelly Hill
- M6 motorway
- South end: Birmingham city centre

Location
- Country: United Kingdom
- Counties: West Midlands
- Primary destinations: Birmingham city centre

Road network
- Roads in the United Kingdom; Motorways; A and B road zones
← A8(M)	→ A48(M)

The A38(M), commonly known as the Aston Expressway, is a motorway in Birmingham, England. It is 2 miles (3.2 km) long and was opened on 24 May 1972. It connects the M6 motorway to Aston and Central Birmingham and forms part of the much longer A38 route.

It is extremely unusual as it is the only single carriageway motorway in the United Kingdom and consists of seven lanes with no central reservation, and operates a tidal flow system in an attempt to minimise congestion. Due to the nature of the road, the speed limit is reduced to 50 mph (80 km/h) for most of its length with a very short length of 30 mph (48 km/h).

When construction work of the motorway began in the late 1960s, many late 19th-century and early 20th-century houses in the Aston area had to be demolished to make way for the new route.

== Route ==
The A38(M) runs from the A5127 through Gravelly Hill Interchange where the A38 joins and then shortly after traffic from the M6 motorway also joins. It then enters a tidal flow section. The road is on a viaduct as it passes through Aston; this section cuts through the grounds of Aston Hall. The road passes through its first junction after 1 mile (1.6 km). It enters a cutting before reaching the second junction, where the tidal flow ends as does the motorway. The motorway is curved in Aston to avoid an Ansells brewery. The motorway was also crossed by a vinegar pipeline, carrying the condiment from one part of the since-demolished HP Sauce factory to the other.

The traffic island at Dartmouth Circus was built where Aston Road met with Dartmouth Street, Bracebridge Street and Allesley Street. where the White Hart public house had been sited. Other than the A38(M) Aston Expressway, the circus also has exits to:

- A4540 (ring road) east, Dartmouth Middleway (previously Dartmouth Street)
- A4540 (ring road) west, Newtown Middleway
- A38 south, upper Commercial Street (leads to St Chads Queensway)
- A5127 north, Aston Road (leads to Lichfield Road)

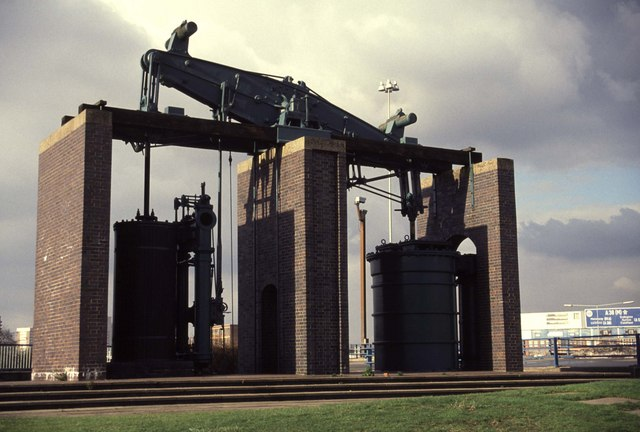
Boulton & Watt blowing engine at Dartmouth Circus, the southern end of the A38(M)

The traffic island at Dartmouth Circus preserves a re-erected Boulton and Watt steam engine (52.4925°N 1.8882°W). The engine was built in 1817 and used in Netherton at the ironworks of M W Grazebrook.

== Tidal flow ==
The Expressway was the first road in the United Kingdom to introduce tidal flow to allow better management of traffic. Lane use is controlled by means of electronic overhead signs, with one lane always closed to create a buffer between the two directions of travel – there is no central reservation. During the morning rush, four of the seven lanes are allocated to traffic heading into the city and two to traffic heading out of it. In the evening, this pattern is reversed. At all other times, the road runs with three lanes in each direction.

Motorcycles are banned from the red-surfaced central lane, which contains a drainage channel, regardless of how it is being used. This follows a fatal accident which occurred when one of the drainage covers came loose.

== Junctions ==
A38(M) motorway junctions
Northbound exits	Junction	Southbound exits
Road continues to Erdington as A5127	M6 J6; Gravelly Hill (Gravelly Hill Interchange) (52.511°N 1.866°W)	Start of motorway
Lichfield A38	M6 J6; Gravelly Hill (Gravelly Hill Interchange) (52.511°N 1.866°W)	No exit
London (M1), The MIDLANDS (M42,(M40)), Coventry; The NORTH WEST, The SOUTH WEST (M5), Wolverhampton M6; Aston A5127	M6 J6; Gravelly Hill (Gravelly Hill Interchange) (52.511°N 1.866°W)	No exit
No exit	Park Circus (52.5021°N 1.8839°W)	Aston B4132
Start of motorway	Dartmouth Circus (52.4923°N 1.8887°W)	Handsworth, Ladywood, Aston, Small Heath A4540 (Birmingham Inner Ring Road)
Handsworth, Ladywood, Aston, Small Heath A4540 (Birmingham Inner Ring Road)	Dartmouth Circus (52.4923°N 1.8887°W)	Road continues as A38 to Birmingham City Centre

== See also ==
- List of motorways in the United Kingdom
- Transport in Birmingham
