= A38 road =

Trunk road in England

A38

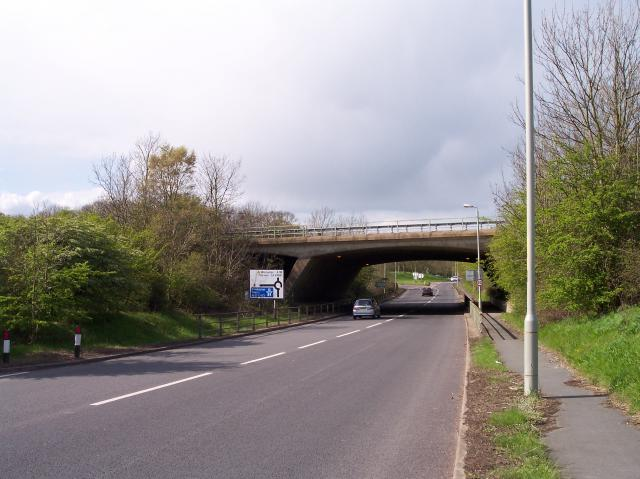
- A38 passing under M50 in Worcestershire

Route information
- Length: 292 mi (470 km)

Major junctions
- South end: A30 at Bodmin
- M5 M50 M42 A38(M); M6 M6 Toll; M1

- North end: A6009 at Mansfield

Location
- Country: United Kingdom
- Primary destinations: Bodmin; Liskeard; Plymouth; Exeter; Taunton; Bridgwater; Bristol; Gloucester; Worcester; Bromsgrove; Birmingham; Lichfield; Burton upon Trent; Derby; Mansfield

Road network
- Roads in the United Kingdom; Motorways; A and B road zones
← A37	→ A39

The A38, parts of which are known as Devon Expressway, Bristol Road and Gloucester Road, is a major A-class trunk road in England.

The road runs from Bodmin in Cornwall to Mansfield in Nottinghamshire. It is 292 miles (470 km) long, making it the longest two digit A road in England. It was formerly known as the Leeds–Exeter Trunk Road, when this description also included the A61. Before the opening of the M5 motorway in the 1960s and 1970s, the A38 formed the main "holiday route" from the Midlands to Somerset, Devon and Cornwall.

Considerable lengths of the road in the West Midlands closely follow Roman roads, including part of Icknield Street. Between Worcester and Birmingham the current A38 follows the line of a Saxon salt road.

For most of the length of the M5 motorway, the A38 road runs alongside it as a single carriageway road.

== Route description ==
=== Bodmin to Birmingham ===
The road starts on the eastern side of Bodmin at a junction with the A30 before traversing the edge of the town to meet the A30 again. It travels through the picturesque Glynn Valley to Dobwalls and Liskeard, which are bypassed by a dual carriageway. The Dobwalls section contains a bat bridge. The A38 continues through the Cornish countryside, bypassing the centre of Saltash and continuing through the Saltash Tunnel. Immediately after the tunnel the River Tamar is crossed using the Tamar Bridge where the route resumes dual carriageway status. The section from Plymouth to Exeter is known locally as the Devon Expressway; it forms the southern border of Dartmoor National Park, and serves as a southward extension of the M5 motorway opening in 1977. It is 42 miles (68 km) long and was completed in the early 1970s. There are several grade separated junctions along its length mainly for local traffic; including a three-level stacked roundabout interchange for the A386, which heads out towards Dartmoor National Park. The route was reserved for the Parkway as early as 1943, when it was included in the Plan for Plymouth.

In the early 1990s, the Marsh Mills junction was significantly remodelled, reducing the size of the roundabout and building a flyover over the top of it, allowing free flowing access from the Plympton bypass onto the Parkway. The viaducts carrying the A38 over the River Plym, which after the construction of the Marsh Mills flyover became the Exeter bound sliproads, were built in 1969–70 as part of the Plympton bypass. They were replaced in the 1990s due to suffering from Alkali Silica Reaction, and the project, completed in February 1996 at a cost of £12.25 million, involved the world's largest sideways bridge slide at the time for the 410 metres (1,350 ft), 5,500 tonne bridge. This required the road to be closed for only 48 hours, which won it an AA National Motoring Award in 1996 for innovation and minimisation of traffic congestion.

The road widens to a three-lane dual carriageway for the Plympton bypass. This opened in 1971 and was the first section of the Devon Expressway to be built on a new alignment, as well as being the first sizeable dual carriageway section of the route. Before Ivybridge, the route roughly parallels the original route, bypassing the village of Lee Mill which is now home to a large trading estate. The Ivybridge bypass opened in 1973 and the South Brent bypass in 1974, both on new alignments. The A38 passes Endsleigh Garden Centre, which used to have direct access from the dual carriageway, although since the early 2000s this has been closed and the garden centre is accessed from the Westover junction for Ivybridge. The route originally ended at the Marsh Mills roundabout, which when opened was the largest in Europe.

The section of the A38 between the A382 junction and Ashburton was built on a new alignment parallel to the old road, and was opened in 1974. Trago Mills, a locally well known retailer, is passed by the road. The Ashburton bypass, much like the Kennford bypass, uses the alignment of a much older 1930s single carriageway bypass, which was subsequently upgraded to dual carriageway by 1974. At the town of Buckfastleigh, the route once again bypasses on a new alignment, although due to the challenging topography of the area, the road crosses part of the town on a viaduct. The road occupies part of the alignment of the former Totnes to Ashburton railway line. From Buckfastleigh to the A385 junction, the current road follows the route of original single carriageway, with the majority of this section being upgraded between 1973 and 1974, although a small section at Dean Prior was upgraded between 1966 and 1967. This section is of a poor quality when compared to the majority of the route between Exeter and Plymouth, containing several side turnings with short exit/entry slips, and properties which back onto the road.

The town of Chudleigh and the village of Chudleigh Knighton are bypassed on a new alignment, which opened in 1973, and the following section at Heathfield up to the A382 junction was upgraded from the original route between 1966 and 1968. Some of this section follows part of the old Teign Valley Line railway.

Before Kennford, the route splits, with the A38 heading for Plymouth and the A380 heading towards Torbay. At this point, the road becomes a dual two-lane road although a third-lane emerges immediately for uphill traffic as the route climbs Haldon Hill, which has an average gradient of 1 in 20 over a 4 km distance, and a maximum gradient of around 1 in 10 (the adjacent A380 Telegraph Hill has about the same maximum gradient). The third lane is lost at the top of the hill, and the next section, the Harcombe bends is an original dual carriageway section, older than the rest of the route and this is evident with its sharp bends.

The Devon Expressway ends near the village of Kennford, south of Exeter, at the terminus of the M5. This initial section was opened in 1977, along with the remaining section of the M5, and is a three-lane dual carriageway. The village of Kennford is bypassed, on an alignment of a 1930s bypass, which was upgraded to a dual-carriageway in the 1960s and then widened to a dual three-lane road in 1975.

A junction to the south of Exeter represents a third meeting point of the A38 with the A30, from which point the A38 multiplexes with the M5 before re-emerging from junction 27 near Waterloo Cross, 21 miles (34 km) north of Exeter. From junction 27 the A38 heads north via Wellington, Taunton, Bridgwater, Highbridge and Bristol. From Waterloo Cross to Birmingham, the road is paralleled by the M5, where the A38 has reverted to taking local traffic only.

From Bristol, it continues north via Gloucester, Tewkesbury, Worcester and Bromsgrove to Birmingham. Between Worcester and Birmingham the A38 followed the line of an identified Saxon Salt road, one of six leading out of Droitwich. At Bromsgrove, it meets the M42 and the B4096 at junction 1 at Lickey End.

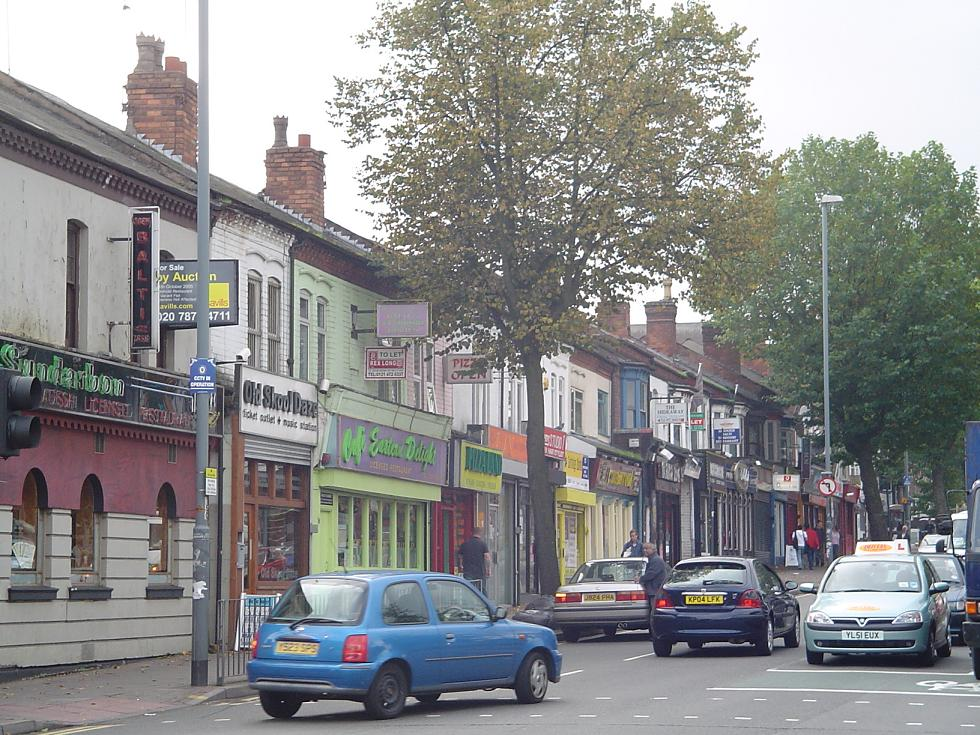
A38 Bristol Road running through Bournbrook, Birmingham, before completion of the Selly Oak Bypass

It passes through Upper Catshill and meets the M5 at junction 4 (along with the A491 road) near Lydiate Ash. From here to Edgbaston, the road is mostly dual carriageway, single-lane sections having been replaced in the first decade of the 21st century (see history section, below). Following completion of the Selly Oak bypass, the A38 deviates from its original route and briefly multiplexes with the A4040 outer Ring Road before forming the new bypass which is controversially named New Fosse Way. (The old route is designated B384 having been briefly B38).

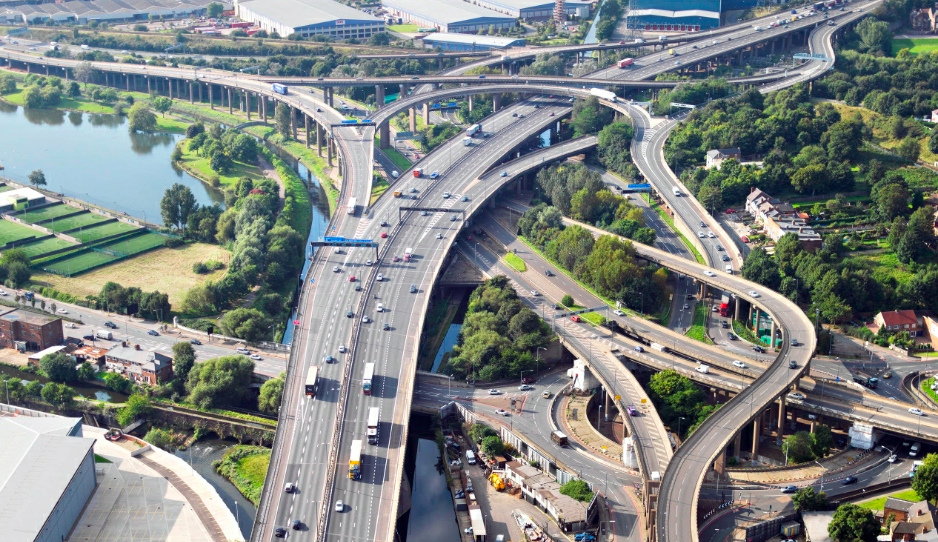
Gravelly Hill Interchange looking westwards; the A38 runs from the top left of the image to the bottom right. Here, the A38 crosses the M6 motorway and the A38 becomes known as the A38(M) between here and Central Birmingham

In the centre of Birmingham, a section of the road becomes the Aston Expressway A38(M) motorway, running from the north-eastern side of the Inner Ring Road through Aston to the junction with the M6 motorway at Gravelly Hill Interchange, better known as Spaghetti Junction.

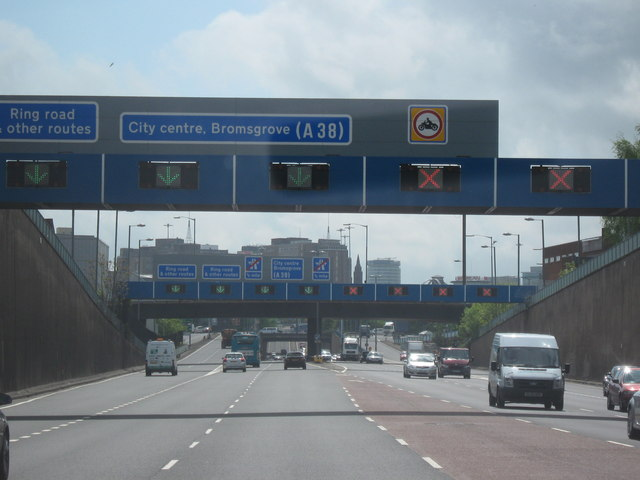
The A38(M) motorway looking southwards towards Central Birmingham

The West Midlands section of the A38 is one of the areas chosen by the Highways Agency to monitor the effectiveness of driver location signs in assisting motorists to communicate their location to the emergency services.

=== Birmingham to Mansfield ===
From Birmingham the road bypasses Sutton Coldfield and Lichfield, before taking up the route of the Roman road, Ryknild Street, (also spelt Icknield or Rykneld), as far as Derby. At Wychnor, the road crosses the River Trent and enters the district of East Staffordshire. At Barton Turn, near the B5016 junction, the road runs right alongside the Cross Country Route for around 1 mile (1.6 km). This railway line follows the line of the A38 from Derby to Plymouth. From Alrewas to Burton, the path called The Way for the Millennium follows the northbound carriageway.

From Clay Mills, the road passes through the district of South Derbyshire, passing the grade separated junction with the A5132 for Willington. Near Burnaston, there is a three-level stacked roundabout interchange with the A50; this junction features Derby with Burton services. The road enters the City of Derby borough 0.5 miles (0.8 km) north of the Littleover interchange. For nearly 4 miles (6.4 km), the A38 forms part of Derby's outer ring road, including three roundabouts: Kingsway (or Grand Canyon) for the A5111; Markeaton for the A52; and Little Eaton (or Abbey Hill) for the A61 and B6179. The section of road between Kingsway roundabout to just north of Markeaton is urban in nature and thus subject to a 40 mph (64 km/h) speed limit.

Originally terminating in Derby at the junction of Babington Lane with St Peter's Street (formerly the A6), the road enters the district of Amber Valley where it passes Drum Hill just north of Little Eaton and is crossed at this point by the Midshires Way and Centenary Way. There is a junction for the B6179 to Ripley and Belper. At Alfreton, there is a grade separated junction with the A61, A615 and B6179. The section from Alfreton to the M1, the Alfreton–South Normanton Bypass, opened as the A615 in the late 1960s. This section has a grade separated junction with the B600 for Somercotes and the Cotes Park industrial estate, and where it crosses the Nottingham spur of the Midland Main Line it enters the district of Bolsover.

As a 1970s upgrade to the route of the A61 north of Derby (which became the B6179), the A38 bypasses Ripley passing through former opencast mining land, before joining end-on with the former A615 Alfreton bypass at Watchorn Intersection. The road crosses the M1 at junction 28. Into Nottinghamshire, the road bypasses Sutton-in-Ashfield, dropping to a single carriageway configuration of 1980s construction, including multiple traffic light controlled junctions – such as the Mansfield, Ashfield Regeneration Route ("MARR"). The final section of the A38 from Sutton, past King's Mill Hospital into Mansfield, is purely urban in nature and is single carriageway, joining the A6009 in Mansfield Town Centre at the end of the route from Cornwall to the northern Midlands.

== History ==
When first designated in 1922, the A38 ran from the centre of Plymouth to Derby. It was later extended west from Plymouth on the former route of the A389 over the Torpoint Ferry to a junction with the A30 at Bodmin. When the Tamar Bridge was opened in 1961, the A38 was rerouted on the former line of the A374, through Tideford, over the new bridge and through Crownhill, joining the old route at Plympton. The old route of the A38, via Torpoint and the centre of Plymouth, was redesignated the A374.

The A38 was extended north from Derby to the M1 motorway and Mansfield in 1977, partly on the former line of the A615.

=== Cornwall ===
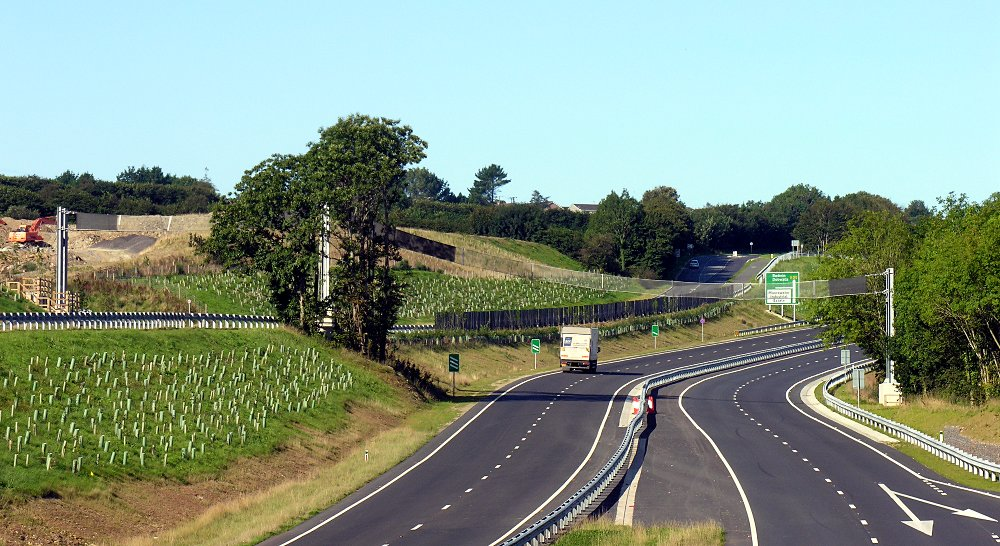
Bat Bridge on the A38 Dobwalls Bypass, Cornwall, UK. (2009)

The Liskeard bypass, stretching for 6 miles (10 km) from the west of Liskeard to Trerulefoot, opened in June 1976. A public inquiry was held for the Dobwalls bypass in February 2005, which was expected to cost £32 million. The bottleneck was removed when the bypass, linking the existing Liskeard bypass to the current single carriageway section through the Glynn Valley opened in the Winter of 2008. A campaign to open this road was started by villagers in Dobwalls in 1930, but planning for building the road was not granted until 2006, the work starting on 15 November that year. Two bat bridges and one bat house were added as the road cut through existing bat flight lines. After opening the Dobwall bypass experienced problems with surface water. This led to lane closures in winter due to risk of ice. A major scheme to reconstruct a mile of the bypass started in September 2014 and is expected to last until May 2015. It is thought it will cost an extra £10.6 million.

In a separate improvement within the Glynn Valley, the Highways Agency stabilised a 840-metre (0.52 mi) section of the road near Bodmin Parkway railway station. The work, which commenced in October 2007, was carried out to shore up the verge, which had been built on an embankment supported by dry stone walling and the root systems of large trees. It was completed in May 2008 seeing the installation of kerbing, road drainage gulleys, safety barriers as well as increasing the verge width to allow for a new surface water drainage system.

=== Devon ===
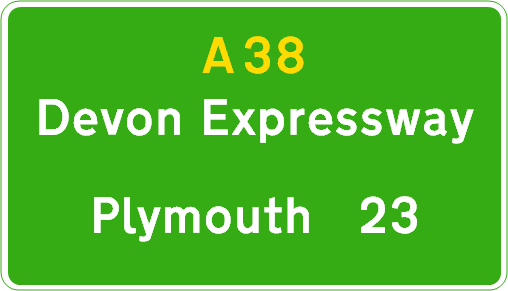
Devon Expressway signage

The A38 in Devon runs between Tamar Bridge outside Plymouth and junction 31 of the M5, where the motorway ends; this section is known as the Devon Expressway. It is mainly a two-lane dual carriageway which runs between Exeter and Plymouth serving as a continuation of the M5 motorway. It is a popular route for tourists travelling to Cornwall, though those wanting to use a continuous dual carriageway route to Cornwall can use the A30 rather than using the Devon Expressway before joining the less major roads over the border in Cornwall. It then runs concurrently with the M5 until junction 27, where it splits and enters Somerset independent but parallel to the M5.

During the mid-1960s, small sections of the route between Plymouth and Exeter were upgraded to dual carriageway, such as those at Dean Prior and Heathfield. This was followed by the construction of Plympton bypass in 1970–71, with the majority of realignment, such as the Ivybridge and Buckfastleigh bypasses, being completed during 1973–74. The route, now known as the Devon Expressway, was largely complete by 1975, with the final section between Kennford and the M5 opening in 1977, coinciding with the completion of the final section of the M5 around Exeter during the same year. Whilst many of the sections were newly constructed realignments, some sections such as the Ashburton and Kennford bypasses were upgraded from the original 1930s single carriageway bypasses. The Parkway, the section of dual carriageway through the suburbs of Plymouth between the Tamar Bridge and Marsh Mills, was constructed in 1983–84, along a route which had been reserved for this road since 1943. This was followed by the construction of a flyover over Marsh Mills roundabout in 1992, providing a non-stop route between the Plympton bypass and the Parkway.

The Plympton bypass opened in 1971, and was used for a stage in the 1974 Tour de France, with a 3.5 miles (5.6 km) stretch closed to traffic in order to allow the visit of the race to the United Kingdom.

The viaducts carrying the A38 over the River Plym, which after the construction of the Marsh Mills flyover became the Exeter bound sliproads, were built in 1969–1970 as part of the Plympton bypass. They were replaced in the 1990s due to suffering from Alkali Silica Reaction, and the project, completed in February 1996 at a cost of £12.25million, involved the world's largest sideways bridge slide at the time for the 410 metres (1,350 ft), 5,500 tonne bridge. This required the road to be closed for only 48 hours, winning it an AA National Motoring Award in 1996 for innovation and minimisation of traffic congestion.

As with any major road, accidents are likely to occur; however due to the substandard design of some sections of the route between Exeter and Plymouth, the accident rate has been identified as being above the national average for the type of road. A spate of accidents in April 2009 heightened local awareness of the issue, with local MP Gary Streeter calling for a review of the road. A number of improvements have been made along the route in recent years, mainly being the replacement of worn-out road surfaces, such as those at Buckfastleigh and Ivybridge. These projects have also included the replacement of signage, and the reconstruction of exit/entry slips for side turnings, in a bid to make the road safer.

Presently, the route between Plymouth and the end of M5 is all dual carriageway, and branded the Devon Expressway, being the primary route that links Plymouth to the rest of the country.

Beyond the end of the M5, the road runs concurrently with and as the M5 until junction 27. The original route between Exeter and junction 27 of the M5 (Waterloo Cross) was downgraded to become the B3181 when the M5 was opened in 1977

=== Somerset ===
From junction 27 of the M5 to East Brent, the A38 runs broadly parallel to the motorway: junctions 22 to 27 are mostly spurs connecting to the road and all no further than 1.5 miles (2.4 km) from it. The A38 runs around Wellington, through the county seat of Taunton, North Petherton and Highbridge. Beyond Highbridge and junction 22, the road departs the motorway and resumes primary status, going through Winscombe, Churchill and Lower Langford where it crosses the A368 between Weston-super-Mare and Bath. This route is the suggested route for accessing the south of Bristol and Bristol Airport from the South West.

The centre of Bridgwater was a notorious bottleneck on the "holiday route" as traffic from both the A38 and the A39 had to negotiate through the town centre in order to cross the River Parrett. The construction of a new reinforced concrete road bridge, the Blake Bridge, which opened in March 1958 as part of a southern bypass took much of the traffic away from the centre of Bridgwater. The opening of the M5 in 1974 further reduced the traffic pressure. This is complemented by a link road (Western Way) linking the A38 and the A39 north and west of the town respectively.

Much of the A38 through Somerset was built as single carriageway, with some three-lane passing points. However, the construction of the M5 through Somerset, in the early 1970s, led to the building of links between the A38 and the M5 in the form of new roundabouts on the A38 linking into adjacent junctions on the M5.

=== Bristol ===
The A38 serves Bristol Airport to the southwest of the city, and enters the city itself at Highridge, along Bedminster Down and into Bedminster. It runs through central Bristol before leaving northwards along North Street, Stokes Croft and Gloucester Road. It runs past the former Filton Airport in South Gloucestershire to meet the M5 again at junction 16. Thereafter it runs through Almondsbury and by-passes Thornbury to enter Gloucestershire.

==== South of Bristol ====
South of Bristol, the road was diverted in 2001 to cater for an extension of the runway and installation of a category 3 landing system at Bristol Airport. The route south of the city, despite serving the airport, is single-carriageway and suffers from heavy volume of traffic at peak times, and congestion along Bedminster Down. From Bedminster Down the A38 follows West Street and East Street through the centre of Bedminster, but drivers from the south were advised by road signs not to follow the A38 into the city, but to use the A3029 (Winterstoke Road) to enter from the west, as this route had a greater capacity. As part of the Greater Bristol Strategic Transport Study, a link road had been under consideration to the south of Bristol. This is in part due to the congestion at Winterstoke Road and Barrow Gurney, both of which are very busy, especially the latter where the road can only accommodate travelling at one direction at a given time; and the incomplete Bristol Ring Road (A4174). This road, named the South Bristol Link, was subsequently opened in 2017 and now surpasses the A3029 (Winterstoke Road) as the main route from Bristol Airport to the city centre and the motorway network north of Bristol.

==== Central Bristol ====
In central Bristol, the original route from Bedminster Bridge ran up Redcliffe Hill and then along Redcliff Street to Bristol Bridge. In the 1950s Redcliff Street was declassified, following completion of the Inner Circuit Road. The route resumes at The Centre. It then follows Rupert Street to the St James Barton roundabout and Stokes Croft.

==== North of Bristol ====
The route to the north of the city is also very busy: it runs as a single carriageway up to the junction with the A4174 ring road at Filton, and where it runs as Gloucester Road is a busy shopping parade. Beyond the ring road, it runs as dual-carriageway past the site of the now-closed Filton Airport which lies in South Gloucestershire, which contains bases for Royal Mail, Airbus, Rolls-Royce and others. The Almondsbury Junction to Southmead Roundabout Improvement would cost £4,915,000 for 3 miles (4.8 km) of dual cariageway in 1975. This improvement was first announced in April 1968, along with the M5 extension from Edithmead to Exeter, and the extension of the M32. It opened in parts, with the last part on 31 August 1978 It was built by Sir Lindsay Parkinson & Company.

Beyond junction 16 of the M5 it runs as a broad single carriageway, again parallel to the M5 in route towards Gloucester.

The present road from Bristol through Horfield was one of the additional roads added to the Bristol turnpike roads in 1749. This passed through Thornbury to Stone, just beyond the boundary of South Gloucestershire, where it met one of the Gloucester turnpike roads. From Almondsbury, the road approximately follows the line of the Roman road from Sea Mills to Gloucester. The previous main route out of Bristol (one of twelve roads from the city, turnpiked in 1727) was Stapleton and Hambrook to the upper end of Tytherington and thence to Stone. This seems to be parts of B4058, B4424, and then unclassified roads. However, Ogilby's Britannia shows a route following the B4058 as far as Cromhall, then through Stinchcombe Bottom, Dursley, and Cam before joining the present road.

=== Gloucestershire ===
The Bristol turnpike roads were continued by a turnpike road established in 1727, described as "from the City of Gloucester to the village of Stone being the great road from the north to west of this kingdom". Much of the road, follows a Roman road, but deviates from it between Buckover and Whitfield.

The A38 was rerouted along the Gloucester Bypass when it was built, and the old route through the city became the A430. In 2007 the Gloucester South Western Bypass opened to traffic, costing £43 million. Though it is numbered A430 and not technically part of the A38, traffic wishing to continue on the A38 on the other side of the city is signed to use the bypass, rather than the existing A38.

Beyond Gloucester, the A38 was probably only improved in 1756 under an Act (29 Geo. 2. c. 58) dealing with roads from that city towards Cheltenham and Tewkesbury. The next section (from Coombe Hill) was improved as one of the Tewkesbury roads, again from 1727. The Act refers to this as the Upper Way to Gloucester in contrast to the Lower Way, which went via Wainsload Bridge. When this Act was renewed in 1756, the road from Tewkesbury to a farmhouse called the Old Blue Ball (now Bluebell Farm) was also included. This was in Earls Croome, Worcestershire, and was where one of the Worcester turnpikes ended. Much of this stretch of the road originated as a Roman road, but the later road left the Roman line near Naunton in Ripple. The name Stratford Bridge on the county boundary confirms its Roman origin there. The A38 into Tewkesbury has been diverted away from the now declassified Gloucester Road along a new link road to the A438 east of the town centre. The A38 resumes in Tewkesbury town centre where the A438 has always met the A38 near the Abbey.

=== Worcestershire ===
The current A38 road follows from the southern end of one of the Worcester turnpike trust's roads which was originally set in 1726, by the Worcester Roads Act 1725 (12 Geo. 1. c. 14), at Severn Stoke, but an act of Parliament of 1737, the Worcester Roads Act 1736 (10 Geo. 2. c. 5), extended it to Upton Bridge (taking it past Bluebell Farm).

North of the city, the road was a particularly important one as it connected the saltmaking centre of Droitwich with the River Severn. In 1706, this was described as heavily used for the 'carriage of salt, iron, coals and other wares'. The first Turnpike Act for this road was an extremely early one, being passed in 1713 and recites:

The highway from the city of Worcester to the Borough of Droitwich ... by reason of the heavy and many loads and carriages of salt and other goods which daily pass through the said road is almost impassible for the space of nine months. — Henry Duke of Beaufort's Estate Act 1702 (1 Ann. St. 2 c. 3 Pr.)

When it was renewed by the Worcester to Droitwich Road Act 1725 (12 Geo. 1. c. 20), it was extended from the Tything of Whistons to the Lower Slip of the Quay of Worcester; from Droitwich to Dyers Bridge (M5 junction 5) near Bromsgrove; and through the town of Droitwich from "Netherwith" [Netherwich] Bridge to a place called "Chapel on the Bridge". In 1749, this was again extended, by the Worcestershire Roads Act 1748 (22 Geo. 2. c. 43), through the town of Bromsgrove to Spadebourne Bridge, immediately north of the town. Where the road leaves Worcester, it again does not follow the line of the Roman road in the same direction until it picks up the Roman line, just south of Martin Hussingtree. The Roman road took a more direct line over Rainbow Hill and through Blackpole, now B4550. From Martin Hussingtree, the A38 closely follows the Roman line to beyond Bromsgrove. The present road deviates from its line when it was originally classified at Droitwich where the main road is a bypass, the old road now mostly being B4090. This happens again at Bromsgrove, where A38 is again a bypass, the old line mostly now being B4091 and Bromsgrove High Street (now partly pedestrianised, then through the town centre. The Bromsgrove Eastern Bypass was constructed in 1980.

A short distance north of where the old A38 (now declassified) joins the Bromsgrove bypass, is Lickey End, where an old highway intersection has been replaced by junction 1 of M42 motorway. Here, the road is joined from the southeast by the B4096, Alcester Road, which was from 1754 one of the roads of the Alcester turnpike trust. The continuation northwards of B4096 is called Old Birmingham Road, because it was the original route of the turnpike to Birmingham, climbing to a pass in the Lickey Hills. The Roman road also went through the same pass, but its route to the pass was probably rather straighter. Beyond the motorway junction, the A38 was turnpiked, not as the turnpike to Birmingham, but to Halesowen and Dudley, by the Bromsgrove and Birmingham Roads Act 1726 (13 Geo. 1. c. 15) that also turnpiked Old Birmingham Road. The Worcester and Warwick Roads Act 1741 (15 Geo. 2. c. 7) appointed separate trustees for the Dudley Road in 1742 and the Bromsgrove to Birmingham Roads Act 1747 (21 Geo. 2. c. 22) appointed trustees for the Birmingham Road in 1748. The road continues from the M42 junction 1 towards Catshill and up a short incline at which there is a fork. Prior to the construction of the M5 motorway in the early 1960s, the Halesowen Road continued West whilst Birmingham Road continued North to meet the existing dual carriageway just South of Rubery. After the M5 was constructed, all traffic was diverted along Halesowen Road (then the A459) which was widened and lit to provide a direct route for the A38 to meet the M5 at junction 4 at Lydiate Ash, with the dual carriageway continuing North to Rubery. The original Birmingham Road survives to this day, but is noticeably lightly trafficked due to its cul-de-sac nature. Its considerable width makes it a very popular route for learner drivers and as such is affectionately named by local people as "Learners Mile".

The road from Lydiate Ash to Longbridge was laid out as a new road in the early 1960s to collaborate with the construction of the M5 motorway which opened in 1962. The road passed through the centre of Rubery until the £770,000 (£13 million in 2025), Rubery Bypass opened in December 1965.

Lydiate Ash was the northern end of the M5 for many years in the 1960s, with traffic transferring onto the A38, which was diverted at this point to link with the M5.

=== Birmingham ===
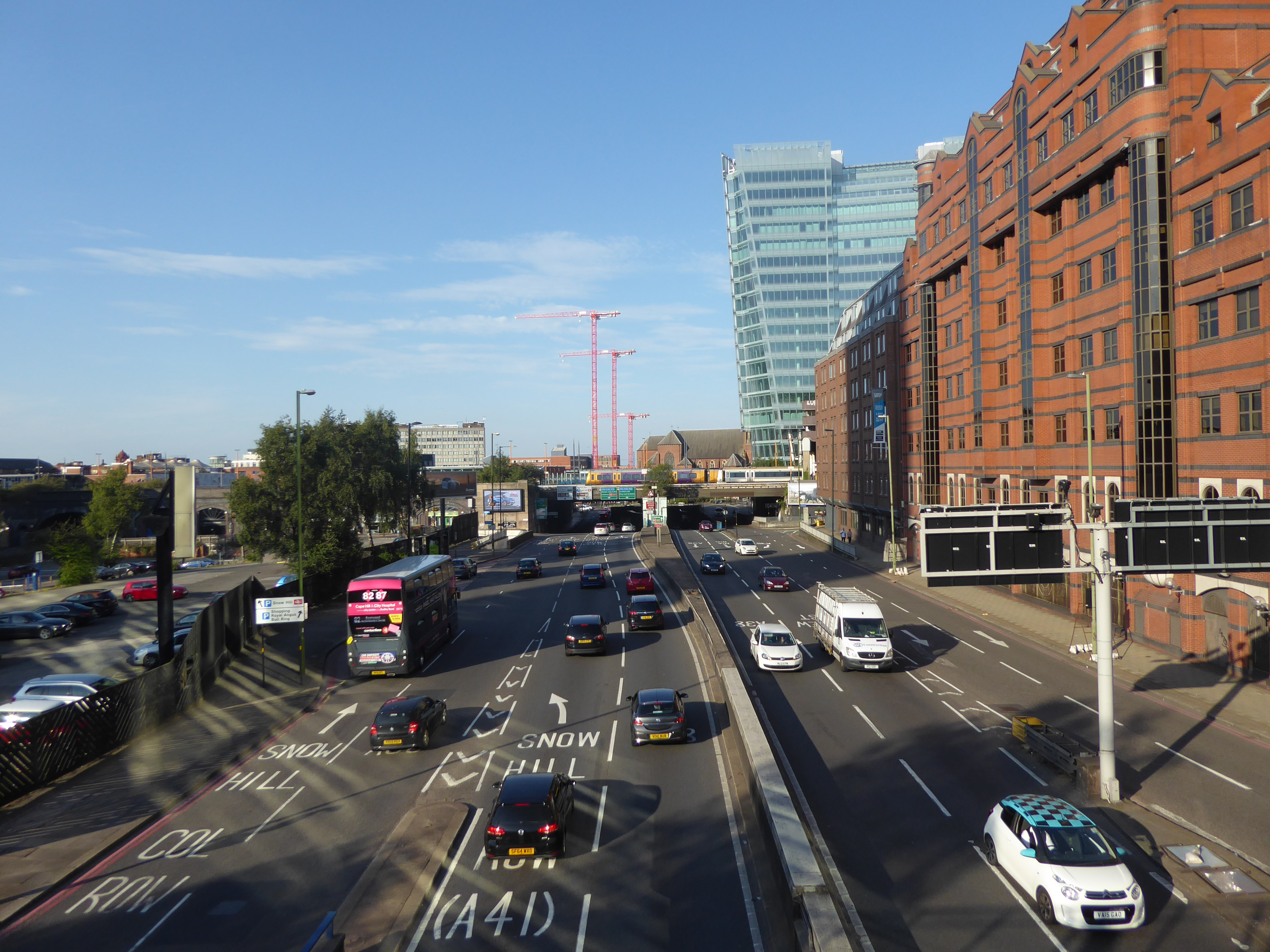
The A38 in central Birmingham (Great Charles Street Queensway)

At Longbridge, new turnpike joined the Roman road and the original turnpike, and runs straight towards the city centre. Hutton, the Birmingham historian described the road:

[Birmingham] to Bromsgrove 13 miles [is] made extremely commodious for the first four miles under the patronage of John Kettle esq in 1772 at an expense of £5000, but afterwards is so confined that two horses cannot pass without danger; the sun and winds are excluded, and the rivers lie open to the stranger and he travels through dirt at midsummer.

The Northfield bypass, taking traffic away from the congested town centre opened on 11 April 2007. Between Northfield and Selly Oak, the road is likely to have been in use in the medieval period as the road approximately follows the boundary of the former Weoley Park, the great park belonging to Weoley Castle. A 2.4 kilometres (1.5 mi) dual carriageway bypass (52.44696°N 1.93923°W) of the narrow section from Selly Oak to Bournbrook opened in August 2011. This required new bridges to carry the Worcester and Birmingham Canal and the Cross-City railway line over the road. The destination of the Roman road was clearly Metchley Fort, but A38 turns away towards the city centre.

After Selly Oak, the A38 takes the Bristol Road into the city as far as the Belgrave Interchange with the A4540 Middleway ring road. The city centre section takes a novel line, laid out as part of extensive reconstruction works in the 1960s, and is one of the few remaining pieces of the original "concrete collar" inner ring road. Thanks to being mostly underground, travelling through an underpass at Holloway Head and the two Queensway tunnels at Paradise Circus and Snow Hill, plus a flyover at Lancaster Circus, the A38 is able to travel straight through the city centre uninterrupted, eventually meeting, at a final underpass beneath Dartmouth Circus, the A38(M) Aston Expressway. The old road took a largely similar line as far as what is now Paradise Circus, before zig-zagging in a less direct and much slower route through the city centre, taking in the north side of New Street Station and then travelling along Corporation street to briefly rejoin its modern alignment.

Between exiting the city centre and the M6 junction 6 ("Spaghetti Junction") at Salford (on the border between Aston and Erdington), the modern route follows the A38(M) Aston Expressway, an unusual seven-lane, single carriageway (and speed limited to 50 mph (80 km/h)) urban motorway which uses an electronic signage-controlled tidal flow system to provide three lanes each way off-peak, and a 4/2 lane split at peak times (prioritising citybound traffic in the morning, and outbound traffic at night). This merges directly onto the M6 in both directions, as well as the A5127 and A38 surface streets, via an intertwined series of flyovers, meaning there is an uninterrupted run from the motorway and these suburban feeder roads all the way to the southern ring road junction. The original route is now taken by the A5127, starting and terminating at the same points but providing a somewhat slower ride through mixed industrial and residential areas with several roundabout and traffic light controlled at-grade crossings, and since signed and re-engineered with a focus on local access, public transport and non-motorway traffic.

Beyond Salford Circus, the A38 used to pass through Erdington, Wylde Green and particularly Sutton Coldfield town centres (and then Four Oaks, Mere Green and Shenstone) on its way towards Lichfield, before the extensive Sutton Coldfield Bypass was built. This passes far to the east of its namesake town, as well as many other north Birmingham suburbs from Erdington through to Four Oaks, requiring an extensive diversion and use of redesignated link roads to access. The old route between Salford and Lichfield is now the A5127, with the A38 designation being transferred to the Kingsbury/Tyburn Roads (former A4097) at the south end between Aston and the bypass origin at Minworth, and the London Road (former A446) at the north end between its terminus at Bassett's Pole and the Lichfield turn, where it (and, via the A5148 link road, the A5127, A5, and now M6 Toll) joins the A38 Lichfield bypass, with the old London road continuing into Lichfield as the A5206. Along the way, it has large roundabout interchanges with the A453 (Sutton-Tamworth, locally) and A5 roads, the latter having been upgraded with a free-flow underpass for the A38 to ease congestion, in concert with the former A5 through Hints being superseded by a dual carriageway bypass starting at the A38.

The bypass is two-lane dual carriageway throughout, offers a 40 mph (64 km/h) speed limit from Salford to Minworth, and is national speed limit (70 mph (110 km/h) for light vehicles) for most of the rest of its run. It is not, however, well-grade separated; all junctions as far as Minworth are at-grade, and although most minor local roads pass over or under the rural section without interacting with it at all (or at least are limited to left-in/left-out access only), a new underpass has been built at Weeford, and many gaps have been stopped up, there still remains some flat junctions with major crossroads and right-turn gaps in the central reservation even as far as the Lichfield junction itself (beyond which, the road is of a somewhat higher standard).

In Erdington and Sutton Coldfield, the original A5127 has been bypassed a second time by more minor urban relief roads, easing congestion in and allowing partial pedestrianisation of their respective town centre shopping areas. A further bypass between Sutton centre and the northern junction with the A453 Tamworth Road has long been under consideration to remove pressure from the narrow, mediaeval "high street" section (that features a pair of historic coaching inns and was, originally, part of the A38), but no actual plans have yet been confirmed even after many decades of discussion.

The bypass itself has been partly superseded, initially by the M42 further to the east, and in more recent years by the M6 Toll, which intersects it at junction T3, runs directly alongside part of the former A446 section between Bassett's Pole and Weeford Island, where it veers off (and has a further junction, T4) to shadow the A5 instead, also crossing the A5127 (at the limited-access junction T5) a few miles later on. The bypass has been effectively slightly downgraded as a result, first with the at-grade, signalised roundabouts of junction T3 interrupting traffic flow, and soon after by the imposition of a 60 mph (97 km/h), SPECS-enforced average speed limit (ostensibly because of a substandard alignment – parts of the southbound carriageway were formed directly from the old A446 – and in order to discourage illegal car and motorcycle racing) on the A453-to-A5 section, making the toll road a slightly faster option even during off-peak hours.

Historically, it is not clear which turnpike trust was responsible for the section of road from Birmingham to Lichfield, or even whether it was a turnpike. Also, the A5127 out of Sutton picks up the Roman road route a little north of Mere Green (having itself diverted via Metchley Fort, the modern suburbs of Perry Barr and Kingstanding, then Sutton Park and Four Oaks/Little Aston), and follows it to Lichfield. The point south of Lichfield where it interchanges with the A5 (once a staggered junction, altered to a simpler crossroads roundabout by the Wall Bypass, then complicated once more by the coming of the A38/A5148 and M6 Toll) marks the crossing of two Roman streets, with the old A5 continuing to the historic fort of Wall, a mile or so after branching off to the west.

=== Staffordshire ===
The road (now A5127) from the county boundary at Shenstone Woodend, through Shenstone to Lichfield was one of the roads of the Lichfield Turnpike Trust, established in 1729. However, this section of the old A38 has been replaced by new dual carriageways.

Beyond Lichfield, the old A38 (now A5127) joins the Roman Ryknild Street at Streethay and immediately after that A5127 joins the present A38. Ryknild Street had to that point run roughly parallel to A38, but following a different line from Metchley through Wall, its line sometimes being used by modern roads (including B4138).

The section from Lichfield to Alrewas was dualled in 1958. The £500,000 (£9.33 million in 2025), section from Alrewas to Wychnor Farm near Wychnor Hall, and the £150,000 (£2.8 million in 2025),section from Wychnor Farm to Barton Turn both opened in 1962. The further section of the route was improved to dual carriageway standard, including the £350,000, 2.5 miles (4.0 km) section from Barton Turn (near Barton-under-Needwood) to Branston in February 1964, bypassing Burton upon Trent in June 1967 (costing £2.6 million (£41.4 million in 2025),), which stretched from Branston to Clay Mills and actually shortened the route – now the A5121 – by 1 mile (1.6 km)), and in recent years many of the at-grade junctions have been upgraded or stopped-up.

This long stretch of road closely follows Ryknild Street (whose destination was the Roman fort at Little Chester) until just short of Branston where A38 swings west, perhaps to avoid low ground. The Roman road is used by minor roads through the suburbs of Burton upon Trent and then A5121 to rejoin the present A38 beyond the river Dove near Clay Mills. The road from Lichfield to Burton upon Trent was another of the roads maintained by the Lichfield Turnpike Trust from 1729. This diverged from the present line at Branston, taking the road through the town centre, and is now classified as A5121. The road from Burton to Derby was turnpiked in 1753. Beyond the start of the Derby bypass, the old A38 has been reclassified as A5250. This follows Ryknild Street as far as Littleover.

=== Derbyshire ===
In March 1969, the 'Allestree Link Road', from the A6 at Allestree to the former A61 was opened, crossing the River Derwent and Midland Main Line.

Further improvements in the late 1960s and 1970s saw construction of the £5.2 million (£40.4 million in 2025) Mickleover bypass to the south-west of Derby opened on 19 February 1975. Although the government had approved the section through Allestree as early as 1974, before the Mickleover bypass had been completed, this section had many objections from nearby residents, delaying its construction (from the A52 to the A6). It was opposed directly by Derby Borough Council and the former Derby Higher Education College. The £17 million (£57.8 million in 2025) road was eventually opened on 7 September 1983, known as Queensway. An extension of the A38 northwards, crossing the M1 at junction 28, and ending in Mansfield was built. The £3 million (£17.6 million in 2025) Little Eaton-Holbrook Improvement opened on 3 October 1977.

The £12 million (£70.5 million in 2025) 10-mile (16 km) Ripley-Swanwick Bypass was opened by Eric Varley (MP for Chesterfield) on 21 October 1977, although the section from Alfreton to the Hartshay Hill roundabout with the A610 had been open to traffic since 5 September 1977.

=== Nottinghamshire ===
To the east of junction 28 of the M1, the road used to be the A615 until October 1977. The alignment of this road is relatively modern as the dangerous junction with Berristow Lane was improved to grade-separated in the late 1990s, incorporating access to a busy shopping centre, long known as McArthurGlen, then East Midlands Designer Outlet and latterly as Frasers Plus.

== Notable locations ==
Image	Name	Location	Coordinates
	Southern end of A38	Bodmin, Cornwall	50°28′53″N 4°41′54″W
	Dobwalls Bypass	Cornwall	50°27′37″N 4°31′06″W
	Tamar Bridge	Cornwall & Devon border, city of Plymouth	50°24′29″N 4°12′14″W
	Former southern end of the Cullompton bypass	Somerset	50°49′11″N 3°24′30″W
	Spaghetti Junction	Birmingham, West Midlands	52°30′40″N 1°51′58″W
	Northern end of A38	Mansfield, Nottinghamshire	53°08′37″N 1°12′04″W

== See also ==
- Great Britain road numbering scheme
