= Shenstone Lodge School =

Special school in Staffordshire, England

Location
- Birmingham Road; Shenstone; Staffordshire, WS14 0LB; England; 52.6244°N 1.8398°W

Information
- Type: Special school: Academy
- Local authority: Sandwell
- Trust: Manor Hall Academy Trust
- Department for Education URN: 147347 Tables
- Ofsted: Reports
- Executive Head Teacher: Neil Toplass
- Gender: Co-educational
- Age: 4 to 16
- Enrollment: 98 (December 2021)
- Website: www.shenstonelodge.co.uk

Shenstone Lodge School is a residential special school for children with behaviour or emotional difficulties, in Shenstone, Staffordshire, England, between Lichfield and Sutton Coldfield. It caters for children aged 4–13. It also has a second site in Tividale which caters for children 11-16. It offers day placements and also, where appropriate, home tuition.

Although partly located in Staffordshire, the school is primarily for pupils coming from the Sandwell area.

== The school ==
The school in Shenstone has 4 classrooms for KS1 and 2 2 acres (0.81 ha) of land, a big house where the bedrooms and dining room are and an outdoor swimming pool. The school also has a new sports hall, meeting room and changing rooms that were completed in 2010. It caters for boys and girls with a variety of emotional and behavioural issues. Links have been forged with a number of secondary schools within Sandwell.

The school in Tividale, Oldbury has a number of classrooms, independent living accommodation and an outdoor MUGA and field for physical activity lessons.

== Pupils ==
In Lichfield, Shenstone Lodge boards 5 days a week for boys, girls, and also has day pupils until 3pm. In Tividale the provision is for the school day.
