= Castle Old Fort =

- Location within West Midlands county

General information
- Type: Hill fort
- Location: Stonnall, England
- Coordinates: 52.62707°N 1.90943°W
- Construction started: Iron Age

Technical details
- Size: 3.5 acres (1.4 ha)

Castle Old Fort is a small Iron Age hill fort in Stonnall, in the Metropolitan borough of Walsall, West Midlands, England. Its interior is now occupied by a house.

The structure is a promontory fort in that it is situated on the southern side of Castle Hill, presumably enabling its occupiers to overlook the southern approach of the ancient highway, Chester Road.

The fort covers 3.5 acres (1.4 ha) acres in an ovoid shape, measuring 170 m (560 ft) from north to south and 130 m (430 ft) from east to west. It has an earth rampart surrounded by a ditch, with an entrance in the south east. There is some evidence that there may originally have been a second line of defences comprising a bank and a ditch.

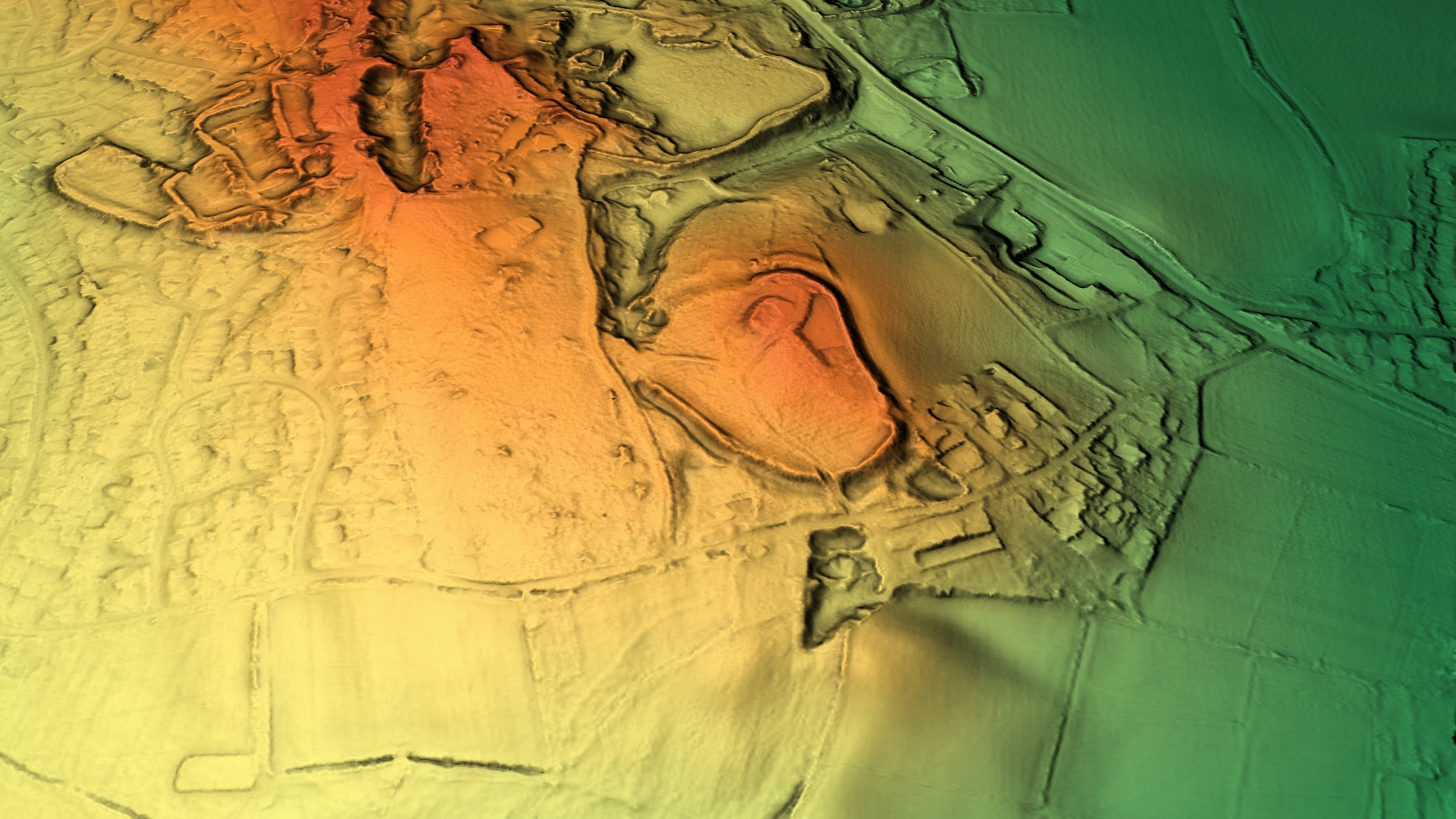
3D view of the digital terrain model

The seventeenth century archaeologist Robert Plot reported findings of flint arrowheads, Roman pottery and Roman coins of Otho, Domitian and Nero, and the existence of a second entrance in the north west of the fort, in an area that has since been destroyed by quarrying.
