= Listed buildings in Shenstone, Staffordshire =

Shenstone is a civil parish in the district of Lichfield, Staffordshire, England. It contains 55 buildings that are recorded in the National Heritage List for England. Of these, two are listed at Grade II*, the middle grade, and the others are at Grade II, the lowest grade. The parish contains the villages of Shenstone and Stonnall, the area of Little Aston, and the surrounding countryside. Most of the listed buildings are houses and associated structures, cottages, farmhouses and farm buildings. The other listed buildings include three churches, the isolated tower from a previous church, the rest of which has been demolished, public houses, a bridge, a war memorial, two mileposts, and two pumping stations.

== Key ==
Grade	Criteria
II*	Particularly important buildings of more than special interest
II	Buildings of national importance and special interest

== Buildings ==
Name and location	Photograph	Date	Notes	Grade
Church tower 52.63711°N 1.83974°W	—	13th century	The west tower of the previous church, the remainder of which has been demolished, is in sandstone, it has a square plan, and three stages. The tower contains a south doorway, the bell openings are lancets, and at the top is a moulded cornice and a parapet. Attached is an outshut to the south, and a fragment of the south aisle.	II*
5 and 7 Penfold Hill; 52.64067°N 1.84117°W	—	Early 17th century	A pair of houses that were refaced in the 18th century and altered in the 20th century. They have a timber framed core, they were refaced in red brick, and have a dentiled eaves course and a tile roof. There are two storeys, two bays, and later extensions at each end. The windows are casements, and inside there is exposed timber framing.	II
36 and 38 Main Street; 52.63878°N 1.84008°W	—	17th century	The building was extended in the 19th century. It has a timber framed core with red brick infill, the extensions are in red brick, and the roof is tiled. There are two ranges, one facing the road, and the other set diagonally at the rear. The front range has a two-storey gable facing the road containing casement windows, and to the right is a lean-to with a doorway. The rear range has one storey and an attic with dormers.	II
Ivy House, Main Street; 52.63832°N 1.83825°W	—	17th century	The house was substantially enlarged in the 19th century. It is in red brick with hipped tile roofs, and has a complex L-shaped plan. The right bay has two storeys, it is bowed and projects widely. To its left is a three-storey porch tower with quoins and containing a doorway with a moulded surround, a fanlight, and a cornice. The two bays to the left are recessed and wider, the right of these with two storeys and an attic dormer, and the left with two storeys. Most of the windows are tripartite sashes.	II
Shenstone Hall; 52.64068°N 1.83429°W	—	17th century	A large farmhouse that was altered and refaced in the 19th century. It is in red brick with stone dressings, quoins, floor bands, and a tile roof with brattished verge parapets and finials. There are two storeys and attics, and a plan of two parallel ranges. On the west front are three gables, mullioned windows, and in the centre is a three-storey flat-roofed porch with a blocked Tudor arched entrance. There are also three gables on the east front, and the windows are sashes. In the centre is a colonnaded porch with a cornice and a fleuron and triglyph frieze, and a segmental-arched doorway with clustered columns and a fanlight.	II*
Marlais House and Wordsley House, Upper Stonnall; 52.62804°N 1.90349°W		Late 17th century	An inn, then a farmhouse, it was remodelled in 1850–70, and has been divided into two houses. The building is in rendered brick, with a tile roof, hipped at the front. There are two storeys and an attic, and a front of three bays. In the centre is a Tuscan porch and a doorway with a fanlight. The windows are sashes, there are three gabled dormers with bargeboards, and at the rear is a tall stair window.	II
Garden wall, Shenstone Hall; 52.64073°N 1.83484°W	—	Late 17th century (possible)	The wall to the west of the garden is in sandstone and has deep pitched coping. It is about 2 metres (6 ft 7 in) high and extends for about 100 metres (330 ft).	II
Outbuildings west of Wordsley House; 52.62802°N 1.90384°W	—	Late 17th to early 18th century	The outbuildings are in brick with a tile roof. They have an L-shaped plan, with two ranges at right angles. The range facing the road incorporates a dovecote, stables, and a smithy, and the other range contains an open space for storage. The openings include various doorways and windows, some with segmental arches, and flight holes.	II
Ivy House Farmhouse, Mill Lane; 52.63266°N 1.88409°W	—	Early 18th century	The farmhouse is in red brick with rusticated quoins, floor bands, and a tile roof. There are two storeys and an attic, and an L-shaped plan, with a front of four bays, and a rear wing. The central doorway has a moulded surround, the windows on the front are sashes, there are two hipped dormers, and in the rear wing the windows are casements.	II
Barn, Gainsborough Farm; 52.62082°N 1.88429°W	—	1727	The barn is in red brick and has a tile roof. There are two storeys, and it is about 60 metres (200 ft) long. The barn contains two threshing floor entrances with segmental relieving arches, and a wide doorway over which is an inscribed and dated plaque.	II
Barn, Ivy House Farm; 52.63281°N 1.88454°W	—	1747	The barn is in red brick and has a tile roof with verge parapets. It contains two threshing floor entrances with segmental heads, slit vents, and an inscribed and dated plaque.	II
Footherley Farmhouse and barn 52.62230°N 1.84886°W	—	18th century	The farmhouse and barn are in red brick with tile roofs. The farmhouse is in two parts; the right part has one storey and an attic, and two bays. It contains a gabled porch, casement windows with segmental heads, and two gabled dormers. To the left is a taller single bay with two storeys, containing similar windows, and to the left of that is a barn with a projecting outshut roof running don to a low wall.	II
Barn, Footherley Farm; 52.62203°N 1.84889°W	—	Mid 18th century	The barn, which was later extended, is in red brick with cogged eaves and has a tile roof with verge parapets. There is one storey and an attic, and it contains double threshing doors and three tiers of slit vents. To the left is a late 18th-century extension containing a segmental-headed stable door, and to the right is a 19th-century extension. (Note: Street View in April 2019 shows that the barn has been converted for residential use.)	II
Little Aston Mill and house, Forge Lane; 52.60611°N 1.87990°W	—	18th century	Most of the building, which is in red brick with tile roofs, dates from the mid 19th century. The house has one storey and an attic, and contains two doorways, a window, and two dormers. To the right is a one-bay extension containing a window with a segmental head, and there are further rear extensions. To the left is a water-powered corn mill with a wheel pit, and a projecting gabled wing with two storeys and an attic. Inside the house is a brick inglenook fireplace.	II
Barn northeast of Little Aston Mill, Forge Lane; 52.60612°N 1.87955°W	—	Mid 18th century (probable)	The barn, which was extended in the 19th century, is in red brick with a tile roof. It contains a cart entrance with a segmental arch, doorways and windows, rows of vents, and pitching holes.	II
Lonsdale House, Church Road; 52.63841°N 1.83933°W	—	18th century	The house, which is on a corner site, was remodelled in the 19th century. It is in red brick with a floor band and a tie roof. There are two storeys and two bays. Steps with handrails lead up to the doorway, which has a moulded surround and a fanlight. The windows are casements with rusticated wedged heads and raised keystones.	II
Stonnall Village Animal Pound; 52.63077°N 1.89187°W	—	18th century	The animal pound, which has been repaired and restored, stands in a triangular area at a road junction. It is in red brick with dark bull-nosed copings, and has a trapezoid plan. The walls are about 1.2 metres (3 ft 11 in) high, and there are diagonal buttresses at the corners. In the west wall is a timber gate.	II
The Bosses Farmhouse, Wood Lane; 52.61853°N 1.87078°W	—	Mid 18th century	The farmhouse, which may incorporate earlier material, is in rendered brick, with rendered quoins and tiled roofs. It has a double range plan, with a front of two gables. The left gable has two storeys and contains a three-sided bay window and a three-light casement window. The right gable is recessed, it has two storeys and an attic, and contains three-light casement windows with segmental heads. In the angle is a doorway with a moulded surround.	II
The Bulls Head, Birmingham Road; 52.63974°N 1.83499°W	—	Mid 18th century	A house, later a public house, it is in rendered brick with raised bands and a tile roof with verge parapets. There are two stories and an attic, four bays, an extension to the right, and a lower range beyond that. The doorway has a moulded surround and a cornice, to the left is a canted bay window, the other windows are sashes with raised keystones, and there are three gabled dormers.	II
The Cottage, 1 Walsall Road; 52.60283°N 1.86648°W	—	Mid 18th century	A house in painted brick, it has a raised floor band, quoins on the left end, an eaves band, and a tile roof. There are two storeys, two bays, and a lean-to on the right. In the centre is a gabled porch, and the windows are casements.	II
The Fox and Hounds, Main Street; 52.63848°N 1.83959°W		18th century	A house on a corner site, later a public house, it was extended in the 19th century. It is in painted brick with floor bands, and has two storeys. The east front has two gables, the north front has one, each front contains a doorway, and the windows are mullioned and transomed casements. There is a long later extension to the right on the north front.	II
Woodend Farmhouse, Birmingham Road; 52.61707°N 1.83906°W	—	Mid 18th century	The farmhouse is in red brick with bands, and tile roofs with verge parapets, and it has a T-shaped plan. On the right is a range with two storeys and an attic and a projecting gable, to the left is a recessed wing with two storeys and one bay containing a doorway with a moulded surround, a frieze, and a cornice, and to the left of this is a two-storey wing with three bays, the middle bay gabled. The windows are casements, some of them with segmental heads.	II
Barn, Woodend Farm; 52.61699°N 1.83876°W	—	Mid 18th century	A red brick barn that has a tile roof with verge parapets. It contains double doors with a segmental head, and slit vents.	II
Elm Cottage, Upper Stonnall; 52.62804°N 1.90186°W		Late 18th century	A red brick house with cogged eaves, and a tile roof with verge parapets. There are two storeys and two bays. In the centre is a porch, and the windows are three-light casements, those in the ground floor with segmental heads.	II
Fighting Cocks Farmhouse, Carters Field Lane; 52.63886°N 1.89803°W	—	Late 18th century	The farmhouse is in red brick with a dentilled eaves course, and a tile roof, hipped to the left. There are two storeys, an L-shaped plan, and two bays. The windows are three-light casements, those in the ground floor with segmental heads.	II
Ivy Cottage, Gravelly Lane; 52.63027°N 1.87654°W	—	Late 18th century	The house was extended in the 20th century, and is in red brick with a tile roof. There are two storeys, four bays, and a single-storey one-bay extension to the right. The doorway has a moulded surround, a frieze, and a cornice. The windows are three-light casements, those in the ground floor with segmental heads.	II
Little Aston Hall; 52.60155°N 1.87234°W	—	Late 18th century	The house, originally designed by James Wyatt, was altered and extended in 1857–59 by Edward Payne. It is in Italianate style, and built in sandstone, with a vermiculated and rusticated ground floor, quoins, a cornice, balustraded parapets, and a flat roof. There is a central block of three storeys and seven bays, and flanking pavilions of two storeys and three bays. In the centre is a single-storey balustraded porch with six columns and a triglyph frieze. In the ground floor are mullioned and transomed windows with keystones, the middle floor windows are also mullioned and transomed with segmental pediments on consoles in the outer bays, and semicircular shell heads in the central bays, all with balustraded aprons, and in the top floor are sash windows with moulded surrounds, segmental heads and balustraded aprons.	II
Orangery, Little Aston Hall; 52.60056°N 1.87205°W	—	Late 18th century	The orangery, designed by James Wyatt in Classical style, is in sandstone, on a stepped plinth, and has a cornice, a parapet, and a flat roof. There is one storey, five bays on the front, and two on the sides. The windows are round-arched French casements flanked by pilasters with imposts.	II
Shenstone Park Stables; 52.63006°N 1.82300°W	—	Late 18th century	The stables were altered in the 20th century, and have been used for other purposes. The building is in red brick with stone dressings, quoins, moulded eaves, and a tile roof. There is one storey, a U-shaped plan, and a front of seven bays, the outer bays gabled and containing 20th-century doorways. The middle bay projects and has a doorway with a fanlight and a keystone, and at the top is a pediment containing an oeil-de-boeuf window in the tympanum. The intermediate bays contain top-hung casement windows with keystones.	II
Shepherds Farmhouse, Lynn Lane; 52.63708°N 1.88757°W	—	Late 18th century	The farmhouse is in rendered brick, with verge parapets and a tile roof. There are two storeys, three bays, and an extension on the right. The doorway has a corbelled hood, the windows are three-light casements, and in the extension is a dormer.	II
Stonnallhouse Farmhouse; 52.63140°N 1.88027°W	—	Late 18th century	A red brick farmhouse with floor bands, a moulded eaves cornice and a hipped tile roof. There are two storeys and an attic, an almost square plan, and three bays. In the ground floor is a three-sided flat-roofed bay window to the left of the doorway. The doorway and the windows, which are casements, have rusticated wedged heads and raised keystones, and there are three hipped dormers.	II
The Haycock Inn, Little Hay Lane; 52.61616°N 1.82482°W	—	Late 18th century	A red brick house with a dentilled eaves course and a tile roof. There are two storeys and an attic, and two bays. In the centre is a gabled porch, and the windows are three-light casements.	II
White House Farmhouse, Birmingham Road; 52.61835°N 1.83851°W	—	Late 18th century	The farmhouse is in painted brick with corbeled eaves and a tile roof. There are two storeys, two bays, and an extensive lower wing. On the front is a gabled porch, and the windows are three-light casements with segmental heads.	II
St Peter's Church, Stonnall; 52.62689°N 1.89184°W		1822	A Commissioners' church, with the chancel added in 1843 by Joseph Potter. It is in red brick with stone dressings and a tile roof. The church consists of a nave, a chancel, and a west tower that is largely engaged in the nave. The tower has three stages, a west door with a pointed arch, a west window, and an embattled parapet.	II
29 New Road; 52.63802°N 1.84113°W	—	Early 19th century	A red brick house with a tile roof, two storeys and three bays. In the centre is a gabled porch, and the windows are casements with segmental heads.	II
Cartshed, Bosses Farm; 52.61890°N 1.87118°W	—	Early 19th century	The cartshed is in dark red brick and has a tile roof. There is a single storey, and it contains five elliptically arched cart entries and a doorway.	II
Crane Brook Bridge; 52.64225°N 1.83477°W	—	Early 19th century	The bridge carries the A5127 road over Crane Brook. It is in sandstone, and consists of a single elliptical arch. The bridge has a string course, a parapet with a handrail, and hexagonal end piers.	II
Home Farmhouse, Aldridge Road; 52.60414°N 1.86843°W	—	Early 19th century	The farmhouse is in painted rendering and pebbledash over brick with stone dressings, chamfered quoins, and a tile roof with coped gables. There are two storeys, attics and cellars, and three bays. Two sandstone steps lead up to the central doorway, which has pilaster strips, a fanlight, and a flat moulded head on brackets. The windows are sashes.	II
Lincoln House, Main Street; 52.63868°N 1.83948°W	—	Early 19th century	The house is in rendered brick with quoins and hipped tile roofs. There are two storeys and two ranges. The front range has three bays, and contains a central doorway with a moulded surround and a cornice on consoles. This is flanked by three-sided bay windows, and the other windows are sashes with moulded surrounds. The rear range contains a round stair tower containing a stair window with a semicircular head.	II
Little Aston, 114 Walsall Road; 52.59647°N 1.85944°W	—	Early 19th century	A lodge in cottage orné style, it is built in painted brick and has a roof of blue fishscale tiles. There is one storey and three bays, and a large weatherboarded extension to the rear. The roof is carried down over a verandah on wooden columns at the sides and rear. In the centre of the front is a gabled porch, which is flanked by mullioned and transomed windows with moulded surrounds containing casements, and there are casement windows elsewhere.	II
Shenstone House, Birmingham Road; 52.62456°N 1.83852°W	—	Early 19th century	A house in rendered brick with a slate roof. There are two storeys and four bays. In the centre is a semicircular porch with columns, pilasters, and a cornice, and above the door is a fanlight. The windows are sashes, the window to the right of the porch being tripartite.	II
Stowe House, Church Road; 52.63810°N 1.84052°W	—	Early 19th century	A red brick house with a moulded eaves cornice and a hipped tile roof. There are two storeys and a symmetrical three-bay front. The central doorway has pilasters, a radial fanlight, and an open pediment, and the windows are sashes.	II
Piers and railings, Stroud Lodge; 52.63256°N 1.83748°W		Early 19th century	The piers flank the entrance to the drive, they are in stone, about 2.5 metres (8 ft 2 in) high, and are square, each with a frieze, cornice capping, and a ball finial. The railings are in wrought iron on a stone plinth, and have scroll-work cresting.	II
Stroud Lodge, Birmingham Road; 52.63265°N 1.83763°W		c. 1840	The lodge at the entrance to the drive of Shenstone court, since demolished, is in sandstone, and has a blocking course, a dentiled cornice, and a flat roof. There is a single storey and three bays, the central bay projecting with three sides, and containing sash windows. Each outer bay has an Ionic colonnade, behind which is a screen wall.	II
St John's Church, Shenstone; 52.63654°N 1.83935°W		1852–53	The church, designed by John Gibson in Early English style, is built in sandstone, and has tile roofs. It consists of a nave, a west porch, north and south aisles, a south porch, a south chapel, a chancel, and a north tower. The tower has four stages, angle buttresses, an octagonal stair turret at the southwest, string courses, a cornice with corner gargoyles, and a parapet. At the west end of the church is a rose window, and at the east end are five gables and a five-light pointed window.	II
St Peter's Church, Little Aston; 52.60112°N 1.86539°W		1873–74	The church, designed by G. E. Street in Early English style, is built in red sandstone with tile roofs. It consists of a nave, a south aisle, a chancel, a south vestry and a southwest steeple. The steeple has a tower with three stages, angle buttresses, an octagonal stair turret on the northwest angle, corbelled eaves and a broach spire with two tiers of lucarnes. At the west end is a stepped five-light lancet window, and the east window is a triple lancet.	II
Gate piers, wall, railings and gates, Little Aston Hall; 52.59548°N 1.86649°W	—	c. 1900	The gate piers are in stone, and contain recessed panels, carved cornices, and urns containing carved flowers, and between them is a pair of wrought iron carriage gates. Outside these are pedestrian gates and piers with recessed panels, moulded cornices, and ball finials, Beyond these are low stone curved walls with railings, ending in small piers with ball finials.	II
Shenstone War Memorial; 52.63984°N 1.84132°W		c. 1919	The war memorial stands on a triangular island in a road junction. It is in granite and consists of an obelisk on a base. The base consists of one step on which is a two-step plinth and a tapering pedestal with a moulded capstone. The obelisk has a pyramidal top, and on it is a bronze laurel wreath in relief. On the pedestal is a bronze plaque with an inscription and the names of those lost in the First World War, and there is a similar plaque on the front of the obelisk referring to the Second World War.	II
Milepost at SK 094 005; 52.60294°N 1.86172°W		Early 20th century (possible)	The milepost is on the north side of Little Aston Lane. It is in cast iron with a triangular plan and a sloping top. On the top is "SHENSTONE" and the faces are inscribed with the distances to Watford Gap, Tamworth, Little Aston, Aldridge, and Walsall.	II
Milepost at SK 112 048; 52.64113°N 1.83496°W		Early 20th century (possible)	The milepost is on the west side of the A5127 road. It is in cast iron with a triangular plan and a sloping top. On the top is "SHENSTONE PARISH" and the faces are inscribed with the distances to Lichfield, Four Oaks, Sutton Coldfield, and Birmingham.	II
Hornton Manor, Rosemary Hill Road; 52.59933°N 1.85796°W	—	1927–28	The house was designed by Charles Bateman in Arts and Crafts style. It is built in Cotswold limestone with some timber framing, and it has a stone tile roof. The main part of the house has two storeys, with one and a half storeys at the ends, and there is an L-shaped plan, consisting of a long range and a cross-wing. The windows are rebated and chamfered with mullions, and contain casements, in the ground floor with hood moulds.	II
Little Hay Pumping Station, gates and gate piers 52.62526°N 1.81928°W		1929	The pumping station was built by South Staffordshire Water, and is in brick with dressings in red Hollington stone. There is a rectangular plan, one storey and a basement, seven bays on the front, and three on the sides. In the centre, steps lead up to a doorway that has a stone surround and an inscribed lintel. The windows are tall with architraves, segmental heads and keystones. At the ends are rusticated pilasters with stone capitals, there are similar capitals between the windows, and at the top is a narrow cornice, an inscribed frieze, and a coped parapet. In front of the building is a terrace that has railings with ball finials, and at the rear is a three-storey office and service block. At the entries to the forecourt are two pairs of rusticated brick gate piers and metal gates.	II
Mallory, 32 Hardwick Road; 52.58831°N 1.87553°W	—	1933	A house in Modern style, built in rendered brick, with a parapet and a flat roof. There are two storeys, an asymmetrical three-bay front, and an irregular plan including a semicircular bay, a small entrance hall, an octagonal stair tower, an octagonal dining room, and two wings. The doorway has multiple recessed jambs, a concrete canopy, and a door with zigzag mouldings. There is a semicircular bay window, and the other windows are casements with metal frames.	II
Sandhills Pumping Station; 52.64223°N 1.90157°W		1935	The pumping station was built by South Staffordshire Water, and is in brick with dressings in red Hollington stone. There is a rectangular plan, one storey and a basement, three bays on the front, and one on the sides. In the centre, steps lead up to a round-headed doorway that has a moulded surround, a fanlight, and a keystone, and above it is a datestone. The windows also have round heads and keystones. At the ends are rusticated pilasters, above the windows is a cornice band, an inscribed stone panel and a stepped parapet. At the rear is a lower office and service block.	II
Maltings; 52.59952°N 1.86907°W	—	1969–72	The house is in brick, with a large curtain wall glazing, and a roof covered with cedar shingles. It has an irregular plan and is mainly in a single storey, consisting of a long linear range, with projecting extensions at the west and southwest.	II

== Notes and references ==
=== Sources ===
- Historic England, "Church tower approximately 100 metres north of Church of St. John, Shenstone (1038830)", National Heritage List for England
- Historic England, "Nos. 5 and 7 Pinfold Hill, Shenstone (1038829)", National Heritage List for England
- Historic England, "Nos. 36 and 38 Main Street, Shenstone (1374266)", National Heritage List for England
- Historic England, "Ivy House, Shenstone (1038866)", National Heritage List for England
- Historic England, "Shenstone Hall, Shenstone (1188184)", National Heritage List for England
- Historic England, "Marlais House and Wordsley House, Shenstone (1061400)", National Heritage List for England
- Historic England, "Garden wall to west of Shenstone Hall, Shenstone (1038857)", National Heritage List for England
- Historic England, "Outbuildings immediately to the west of Wordsley House, Shenstone (1061401)", National Heritage List for England
- Historic England, "Ivy House Farmhouse, Shenstone (1294832)", National Heritage List for England
- Historic England, "Barn approximately 25 metres north of Gainsborough Farmhouse, Shenstone (1188213)", National Heritage List for England
- Historic England, "Barn approximately 60 metres west of Ivy House Farmhouse, Shenstone (1038865)", National Heritage List for England
- Historic England, "Footherley Farmhouse and attached barn, Shenstone (1038863)", National Heritage List for England
- Historic England, "Barn approximately 20 metres south of Footherley Farmhouse, Shenstone (1294865)", National Heritage List for England
- Historic England, "Elm Cottage, Shenstone (1038827)", National Heritage List for England
- Historic England, "Fighting Cocks Farmhouse, Shenstone (1374262)", National Heritage List for England
- Historic England, "Ivy Cottage, Shenstone (1374264)", National Heritage List for England
- Historic England, "Little Aston Mill and house adjoining to north-east, Shenstone (1320111)", National Heritage List for England
- Historic England, "Barn approximately 10 metres north-east of Little Aston Mill, Shenstone (1076394)", National Heritage List for England
- Historic England, "Lonsdale House, Shenstone (1374263)", National Heritage List for England
- Historic England, "Stonnall Village Animal Pound, Shenstone (1434683)", National Heritage List for England
- Historic England, "The Bosses Farmhouse, Shenstone (1188293)", National Heritage List for England
- Historic England, "The Bull's Head, Shenstone (1188186)", National Heritage List for England
- Historic England, "The Cottage, Shenstone (1374288)", National Heritage List for England
- Historic England, "The Fox and Hounds, Shenstone (1038862)", National Heritage List for England
- Historic England, "Woodend Farmhouse, Shenstone (1038861)", National Heritage List for England
- Historic England, "Barn approximately 20 metres east of Woodend Farmhouse, Shenstone (1294855)", National Heritage List for England
- Historic England, "Little Aston Hall, Shenstone (1038855)", National Heritage List for England
- Historic England, "Orangery approximately 150 metres south of Little Aston Hall, Shenstone (1188180)", National Heritage List for England
- Historic England, "Shenstone Park Stables, Shenstone (1038828)", National Heritage List for England
- Historic England, "Shepherds Farmhouse, Shenstone (1374265)", National Heritage List for England
- Historic England, "Stonnallhouse Farmhouse, Shenstone (1294836)", National Heritage List for England
- Historic England, "The Haycock Inn, Shenstone (1038864)", National Heritage List for England
- Historic England, "White House Farmhouse, Shenstone (1294883)", National Heritage List for England
- Historic England, "Church of St Peter, Shenstone (1038831)", National Heritage List for England
- Historic England, "No. 29 New Road, Shenstone (1374286)", National Heritage List for England
- Historic England, "Cartshed approximately 20 metres from north-west of the Bosses Farmhouse, Shenstone (1038833)", National Heritage List for England
- Historic England, "Crane Brook Bridge, Shenstone (1038856)", National Heritage List for England
- Historic England, "Home Farmhouse, Shenstone (1263818)", National Heritage List for England
- Historic England, "Lincoln House, Shenstone (1188250)", National Heritage List for England
- Historic England, "Little Aston, Shenstone (1374277)", National Heritage List for England
- Historic England, "Shenstone House, Shenstone (1038860)", National Heritage List for England
- Historic England, "Stowe House, Shenstone (1188220)", National Heritage List for England
- Historic England, "Piers and railings to east of Stroud Lodge, Shenstone (1188190)", National Heritage List for England
- Historic England, "Stroud Lodge, Shenstone (1038859)", National Heritage List for England
- Historic England, "Church of St John, Shenstone (1374287)", National Heritage List for England
- Historic England, "Church of St Peter, Shenstone (1038832)", National Heritage List for England
- Historic England, "Gate piers with attached wall, railings and gates at main entrance to Little Aston Hall, Shenstone (1374293)", National Heritage List for England
- Historic England, "Shenstone War Memorial, Shenstone (1422639)", National Heritage List for England
- Historic England, "Milepost at SK 094 005, Shenstone (1294830)", National Heritage List for England
- Historic England, "Milepost at SK 112048, Shenstone (1038858)", National Heritage List for England
- Historic England, "Hornton Manor, Shenstone (1392850)", National Heritage List for England
- Historic England, "Little Hay Pumping Station and the two front entrance gates and gate piers, Shenstone (1421471)", National Heritage List for England
- Historic England, "Mallory, Shenstone (1109945)", National Heritage List for England
- Historic England, "Sandhills Pumping Station, Shenstone (1421472)", National Heritage List for England
- Historic England, "Maltings, Shenstone (1494242)", National Heritage List for England
- Historic England, Listed Buildings
- Pevsner, Nikolaus (1974), Staffordshire, The Buildings of England, Harmondsworth: Penguin Books, ISBN 0-14-071046-9
