= John Lewis Petit =

English physician (1736–1780)

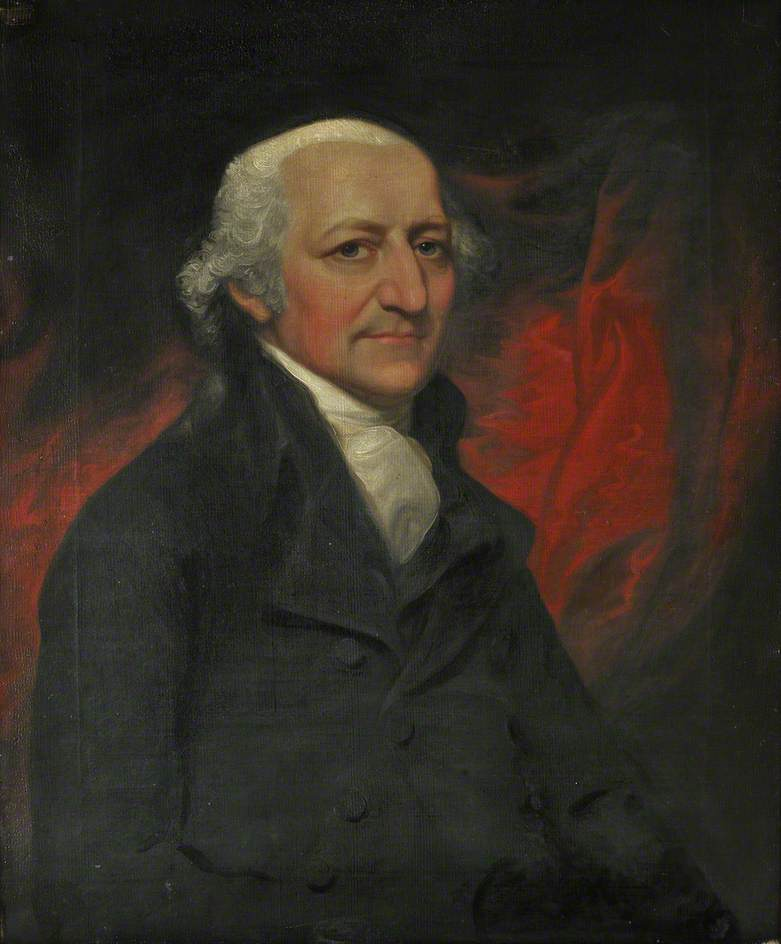
John Lewis Petit

John Lewis Petit (1736–1780) was an English physician and Fellow of the Royal Society.

== Life ==
The son of John Petit of Little Aston, Staffordshire, he was born in the parish of Shenstone, Staffordshire. Admitted in 1752 to Queens' College, Cambridge, he graduated B.A. 1756, M.A. 1759, and M.D. 1766. He became Fellow of the Royal Society in 1759.

Petit was elected fellow of the College of Physicians in 1767, was Gulstonian lecturer in 1768, censor in that year, 1774, and 1777; and was elected physician to St. Bartholomew's Hospital on the death of Anthony Askew in 1774. He died on 27 May 1780.

== Family ==
Petit married Katherine Laetitia Serces in 1769. Their children included John Hayes Petit and Louis Hayes Petit.

== Notes ==
Attribution

This article incorporates text from a publication now in the public domain: Lee, Sidney, ed. (1896). "Petit, John Louis". Dictionary of National Biography. Vol. 45. London: Smith, Elder & Co.
