= Shenstone, Staffordshire =

Village in Staffordshire, England

Coordinates: 52.637°N 1.841°W

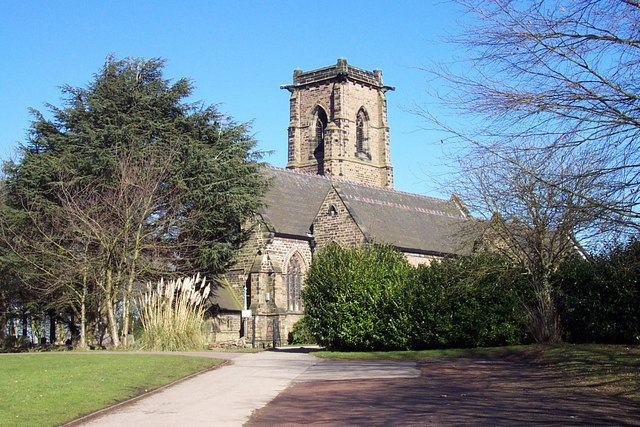
- St John the Baptist, Shenstone

- Location within Staffordshire
- Population: 7,359 (2011)
- OS grid reference: SK108044
- Civil parish: Shenstone
- District: Lichfield
- Shire county: Staffordshire
- Region: West Midlands
- Country: England
- Sovereign state: United Kingdom
- Post town: Lichfield
- Postcode district: WS14
- Dialling code: 01543
- Police: Staffordshire
- Fire: Staffordshire
- Ambulance: West Midlands
- UK Parliament: Tamworth

Shenstone is a village and civil parish in Lichfield District of Staffordshire, England, located between Lichfield and Sutton Coldfield. The parish also contains the village of Stonnall.

== Transport ==
Shenstone is served by National Express West Midlands service X3 to Lichfield, Sutton Coldfield, Erdington and Birmingham along the Birmingham road. Chaserider service 36 operates through the village connecting to Walsall, Aldridge and Lichfield.

The railway station in the village is served by the Cross-City Line and offers connections to the West Coast Main Line at Lichfield Trent Valley and the Chase Line at Aston for services to Wolverhampton, Walsall, Cannock, Rugeley and Rugeley Trent Valley for the West Coast Main Line. There are also services to Redditch and Bromsgrove as well as Birmingham New Street. The village also is the only settlement in Lichfield District to have an active railway station after the two stations in Lichfield.

The village is also situated next to the M6 Toll which offers road connections to Stafford, Wolverhampton, South Staffordshire, Brownhills, Cannock, Tamworth and Coleshill. It also offers connections to the M6 Motorway and M42 Motorway. The village is also near Watling Street which connects from Holyhead in Wales to London. The village is also near the main Chester Road between Brownhills and Leamington Spa.

== Education ==
The village is served by Greysbrooke Primary School on Barnes Road. A previous incarnation of the school was located on Birmingham Road, on the land currently occupied by the Greysbrooke cul-de-sac. Shenstone Lodge School lies on the Birmingham Road approximately 1/2 mile (800 metres) south of the village.

== Interests ==
Shenstone was formerly the manufacturing home of the Norton Motorcycle. David Garside, a mechanical engineer who had developed a twin-rotor Wankel motorcycle for BSA, joined NVT to help establish production of the Norton Rotary bikes.

The village is served by four public houses: The Fox & Hounds, The Railway, The Plough, and The Bull's Head.

== Demography ==
The village had an estimated population of 2,234. The ethnic make-up of the village was 97% White, 2% Asian, and 1% Other ethnic. The religious makeup of the village was 62.7% Christian, 35.1% No Religion, 1% Muslim, 0.8% Sikh and 0.2% Hindu.

== Gallery ==
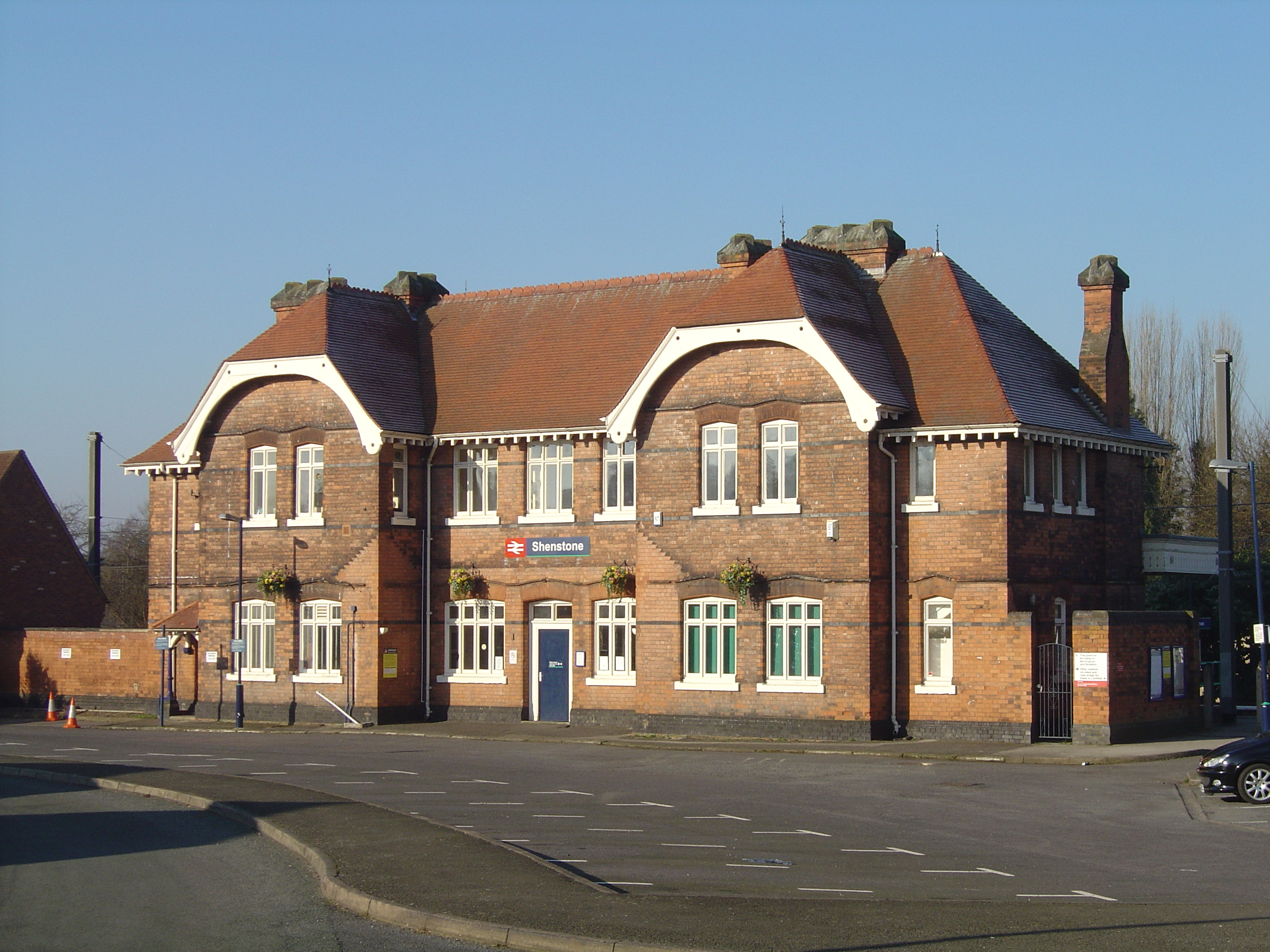
Shenstone railway station

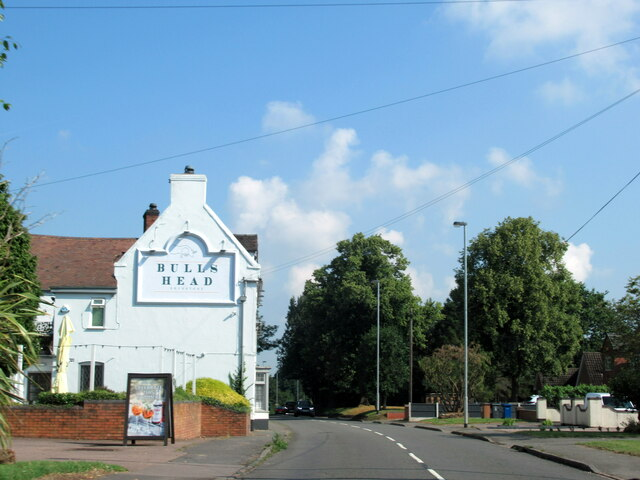
A5127 passing The Bulls Head, Shenstone

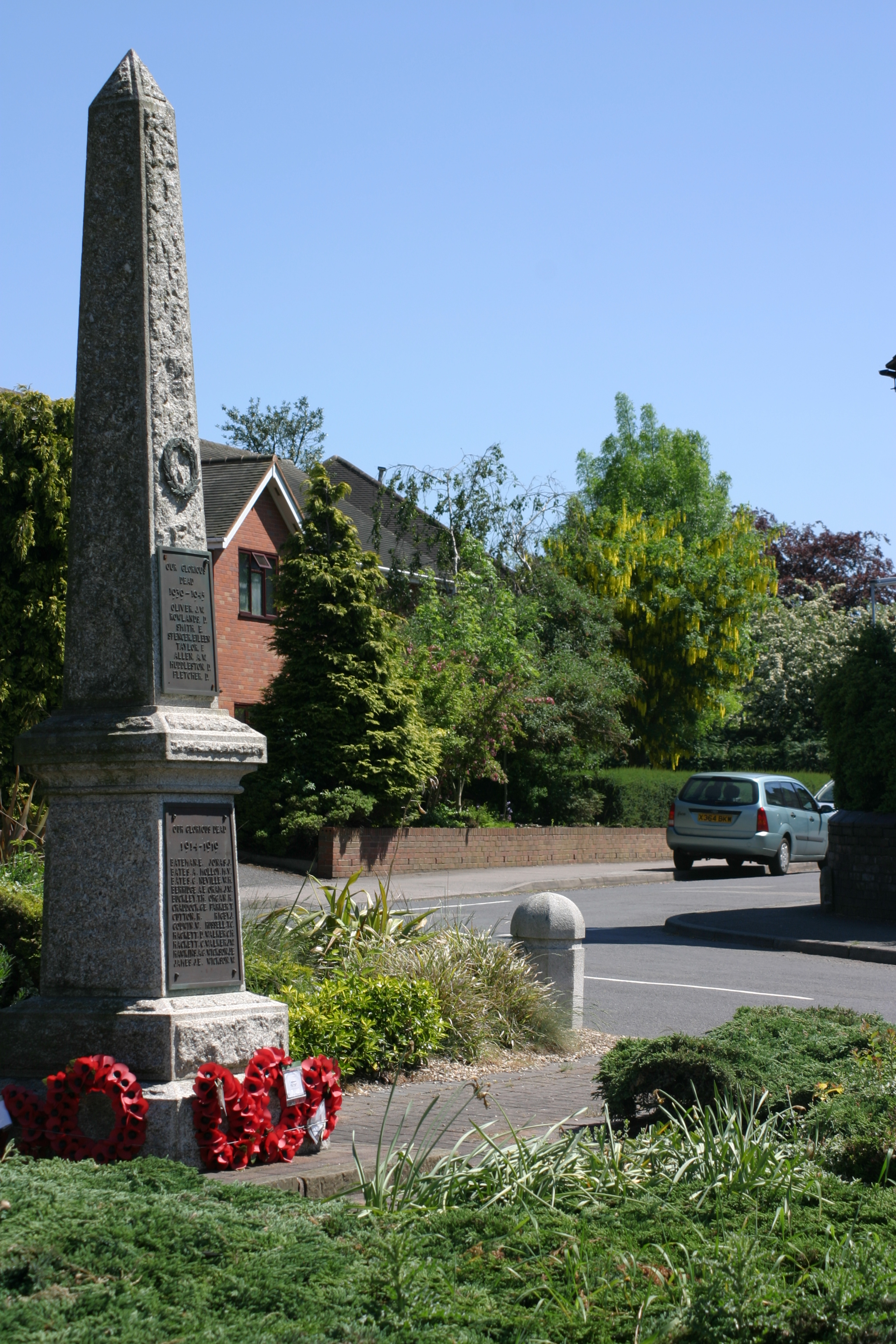
War Memorial, Shenstone

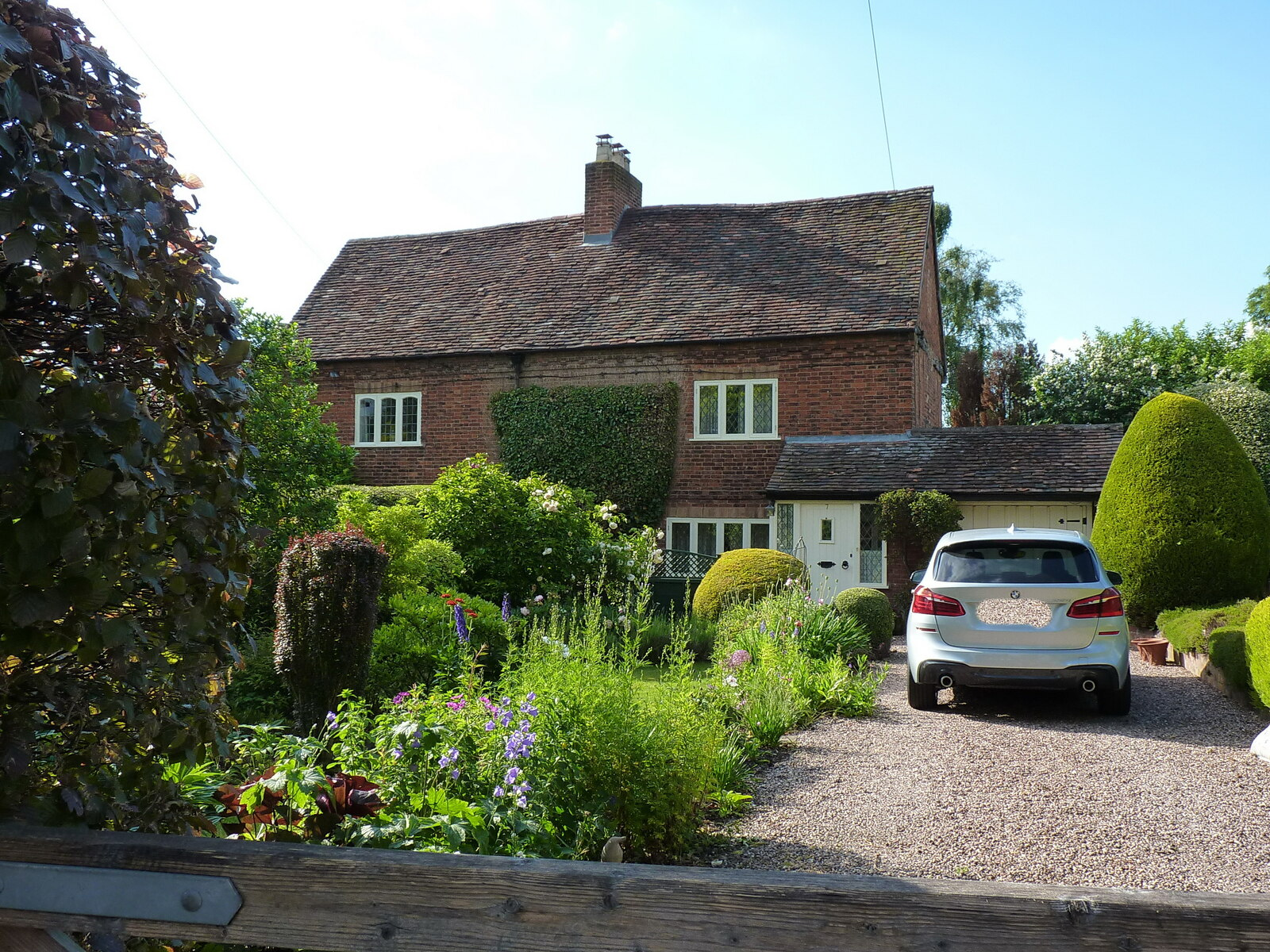
5 & 7 Pinfold Hill, Shenstone

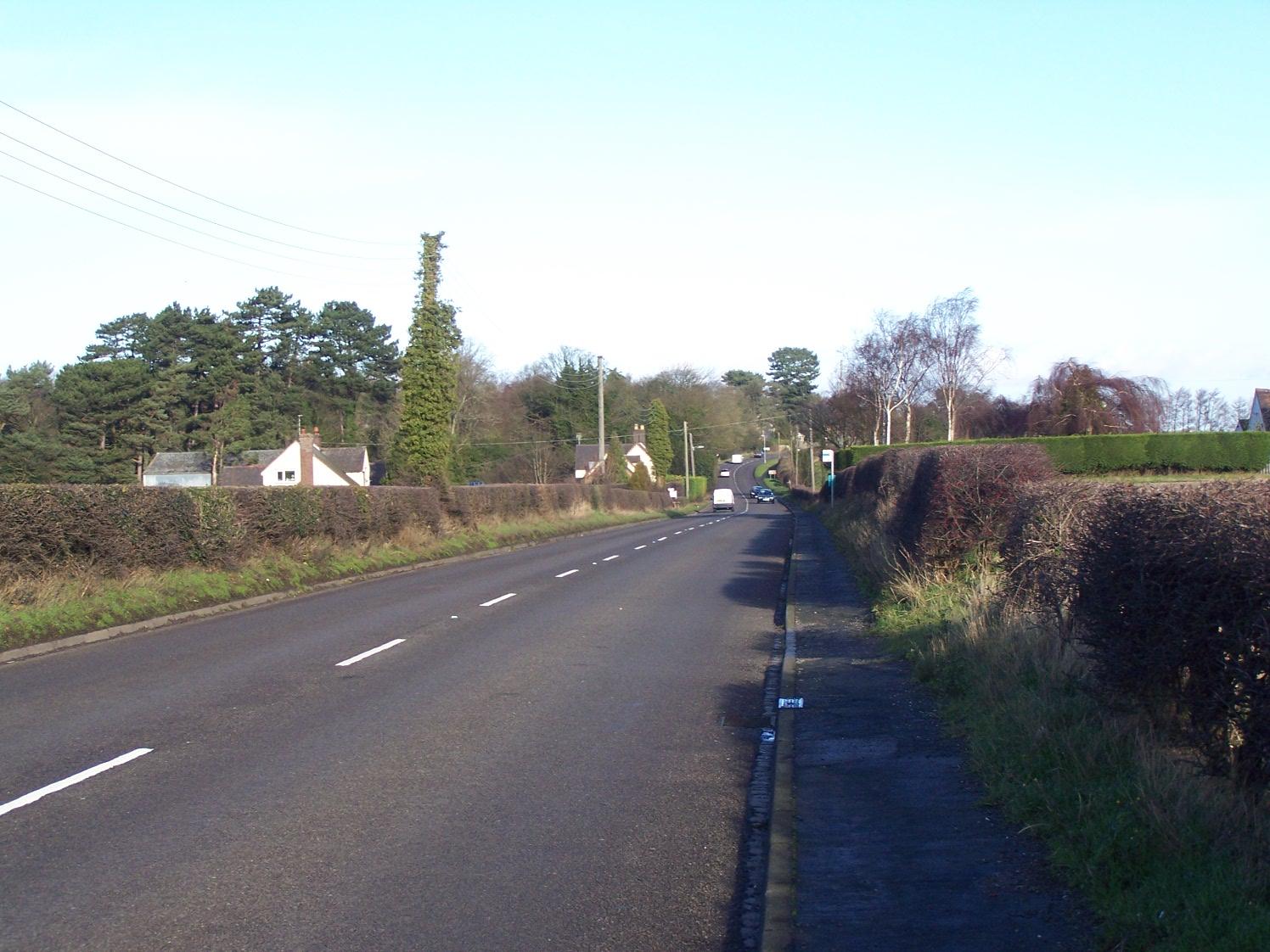
A5127 Approaching Shenstone

== Notable people ==
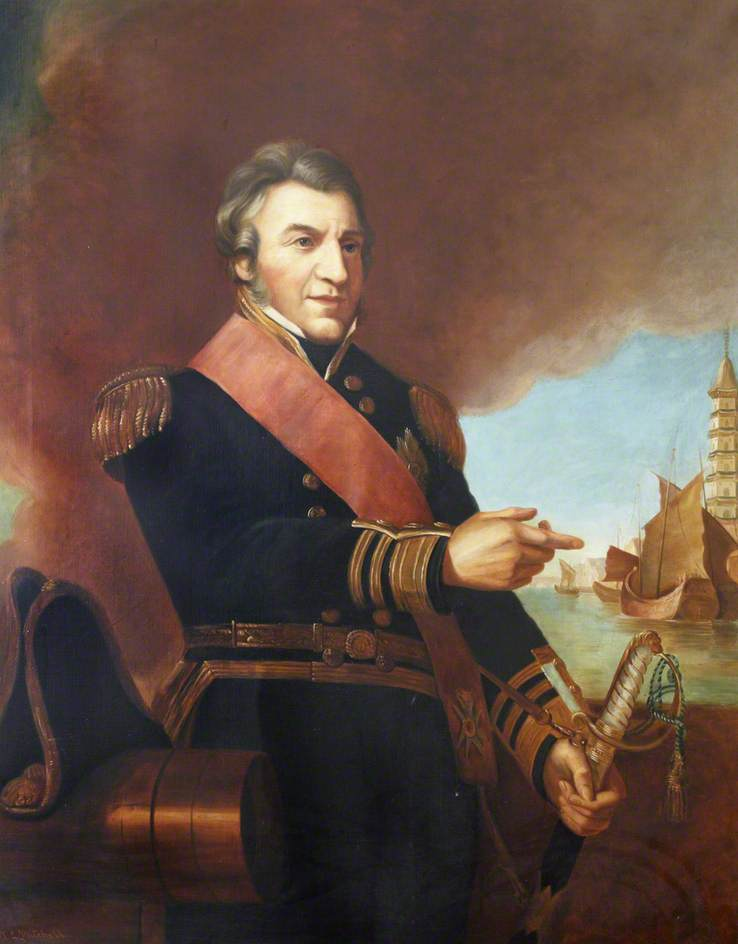
Admiral Sir William Parker

- Henry Sanders (1727–1785), curate of Shenstone from 1755 to 1770, author of The History and Antiquities of Shenstone, described as "a model parish history, containing elaborate accounts of the local manors, hamlets, farms, genealogies, and assessments".
- John Lewis Petit (1736–1780), physician and Fellow of the Royal Society.
- Sir William Parker, 1st Baronet, of Shenstone (1781–1866), a Royal Navy officer, fought in the Battle of The Glorious First of June in June 1794, died locally.
- Edward Hartopp Cradock D.D. (1810–1886), Principal of Brasenose College, Oxford from 1853 until 1886
- Sir Richard Cooper, 1st Baronet (1847–1913), industrial entrepreneur, High Sheriff of Staffordshire, 1901, lived at Shenstone Court.
- Helen Baxendale (born 1970) actress on stage and screen, she grew up in the village.

== History ==
Shenstone is mentioned in the Domesday Book and its population described as quite large.

== See also ==
- Listed buildings in Shenstone, Staffordshire
