= Stonnall =

Coordinates: 52.6333°N 1.9000°W

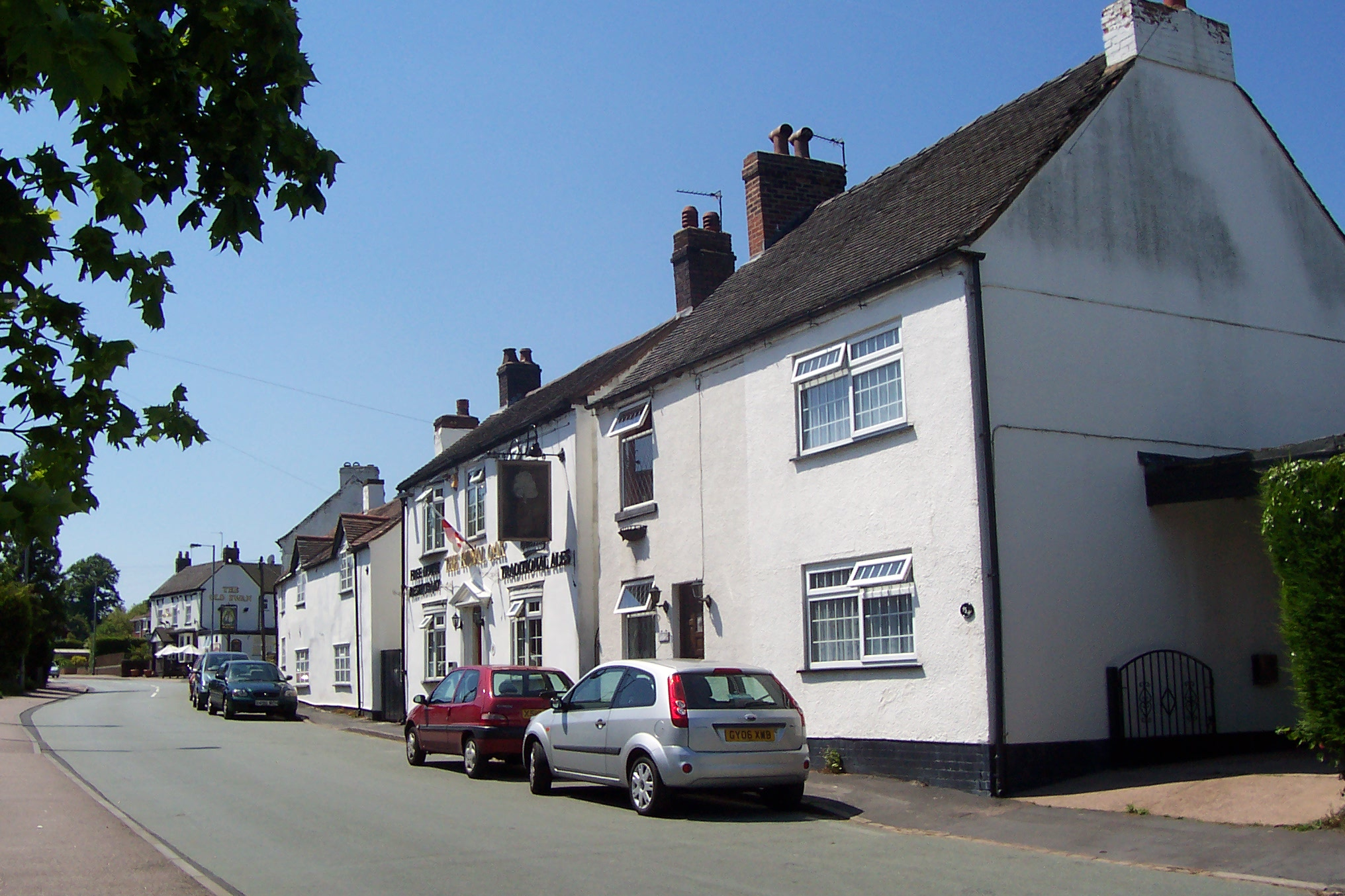
- Central Upper Stonnall

- Location within Staffordshire
- OS grid reference: SK0704
- Civil parish: Shenstone
- District: Lichfield
- Shire county: Staffordshire
- Region: West Midlands
- Country: England
- Sovereign state: United Kingdom
- Post town: Walsall
- Postcode district: WS9
- Dialling code: 01543
- Police: Staffordshire
- Fire: Staffordshire
- Ambulance: West Midlands
- UK Parliament: Tamworth

Stonnall is a village in Staffordshire, England, close to Shenstone, Brownhills, Walsall Wood and Aldridge. It is divided into Upper Stonnall, Stonnall and Lower Stonnall — Upper Stonnall partly lies in the Metropolitan Borough of Walsall; the remainder of the village is in the district of Lichfield.

The village is closely associated with the hamlets of Hilton, Lynn and Thornes. It has a population of 1,546 residents.

== Etymology ==
There are two possibilities or there may have been two dialectal forms.

The name Stonnall may be derived from the Anglo-Saxon words stan and halh, meaning stony nook of land.

However, in the medieval pipe rolls, the alternative Stonwal is given alongside the more familiar form. In this case, the second element may be Anglo-Saxon waelle, giving a meaning of a stony and watery place. It is certainly true that the area has been historically prone to flooding.

== History ==
Bronze Age activity in the area is attested by the discovery of the Stonnall Hoard at Gainsborough Farm in 1824. The items recovered included 22 bronze, copper and lead artefacts.

Iron Age activity in the area is attested by the hill fort at Castle Old Fort, otherwise known locally as the Castles or Stonnall Hill Fort. The fort was probably constructed by the Celtic tribe, the Cornovii.

In the 12th century, Stonnall together with the rest of the Parish of Shenstone was given to Osney Abbey by Baron Robert D'Oyly, the high constable of Oxford. Stonnall remained in the hands of the abbey until the Reformation.

After the Reformation, much of the land was in the ownership of the Manor of Shenstone based at Little Aston Hall.

In the late Middle Ages, Stonnall was a staging point on the coach route between London and Chester. The Welsh Harp and the Swan Inn provided service to travellers on Old Chester Road.

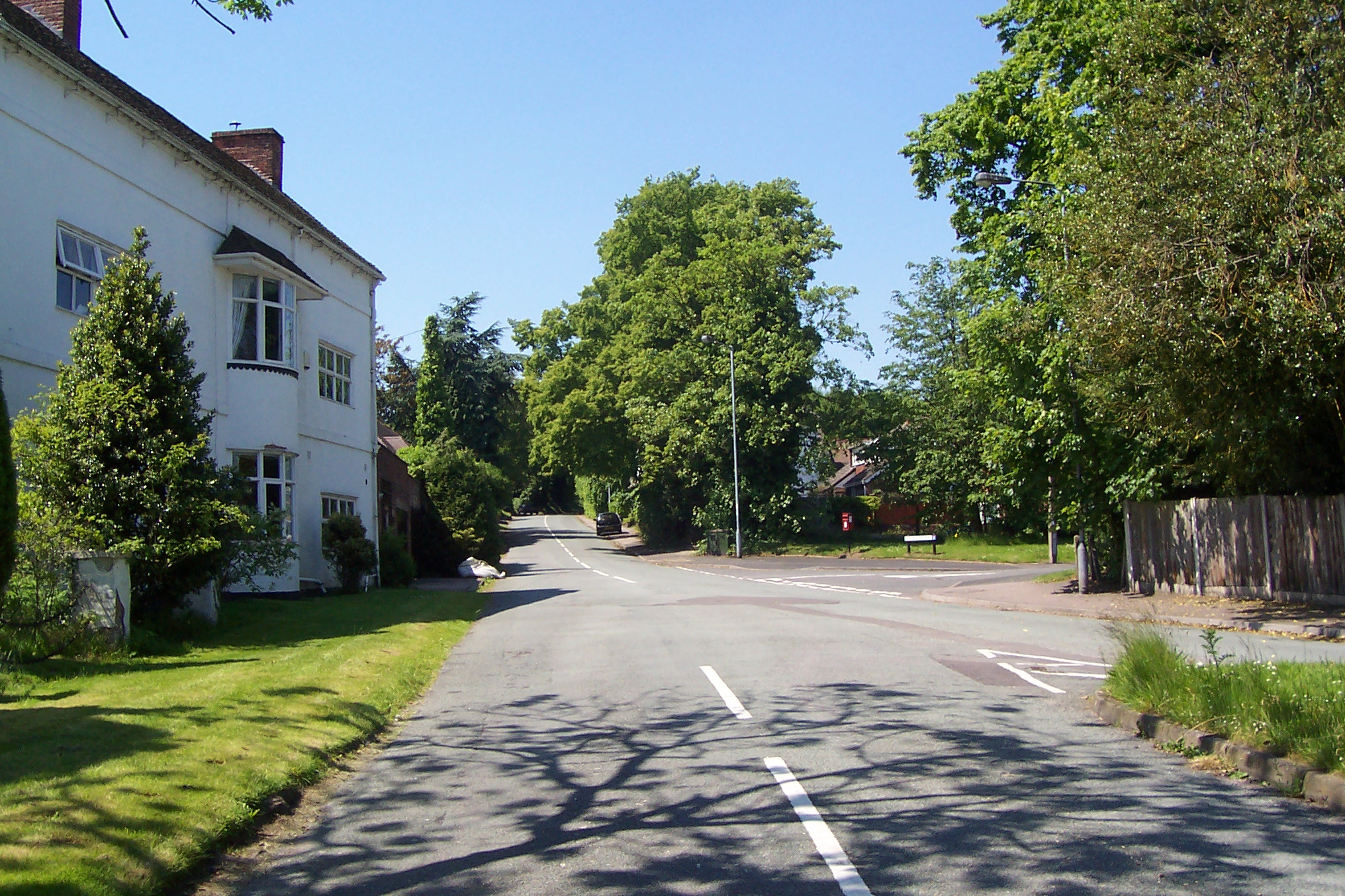
Upper Stonnall.

In the early 19th century, under the direction of the Church of England and with the assistance of the manor, a very highly detailed tithe map of the Parish of Shenstone was produced, along with a book of awards that was signed off by John Mellor, the estate manager at Little Aston Hall. These documents are extant and kept in a county records office.

St Peter's Chapel of Ease was built in 1822 and consecrated on 23 January 1823. Some years later, Stonnall became an ecclesiastic parish in its own right and the chapel was consequently designated as a fully-fledged parish church. Its first minister was Rev James Downes BA, who was the incumbent until his death in 1893.

William Tennant, Lord of the Manor of Shenstone, gave the land on which the church is situated along with £100 towards the construction of the building. Robert Peel of Tamhorn gave a further £60. A total of £623/19s/0d was raised from public subscriptions. John Mellor took on the role as clerk of works as building began.

William Tennant also provided land for the construction of the National School, Stonnall's first educational establishment. This served the village and surrounding area until 1874 when St Peter's School was opened.

Stonnall was part of Lichfield Rural District until 1 April 1974, when local government was reorganised following the Local Government Act 1972.

== Local government ==
As a constituent part of the civil parish of Shenstone, the village elects members to Shenstone Parish Council.

As far as higher local government is concerned, the village is divided between two local authorities. The division of the village that is to the west of Chester Road is part of the metropolitan borough of Walsall.

To the east of the road, Stonnall is part of the District of Lichfield. Liz Hassall and Joseph Powell are the currently elected to Lichfield District Council.

Stonnall is part of Lichfield Rural South ward of Staffordshire County Council. David Smith is the current county councillor for that ward.

== United Kingdom Parliament ==
Stonnall is within the parliamentary constituency of Tamworth. The current member of parliament is Sarah Edwards.

== Notable buildings in Stonnall ==
Wordsley House, which is located in upper Main Street (originally a part of Old Chester Road), is the former public house and inn known as the Welsh Harp. This was for many years one of the staging posts on the coach route between London and Chester.

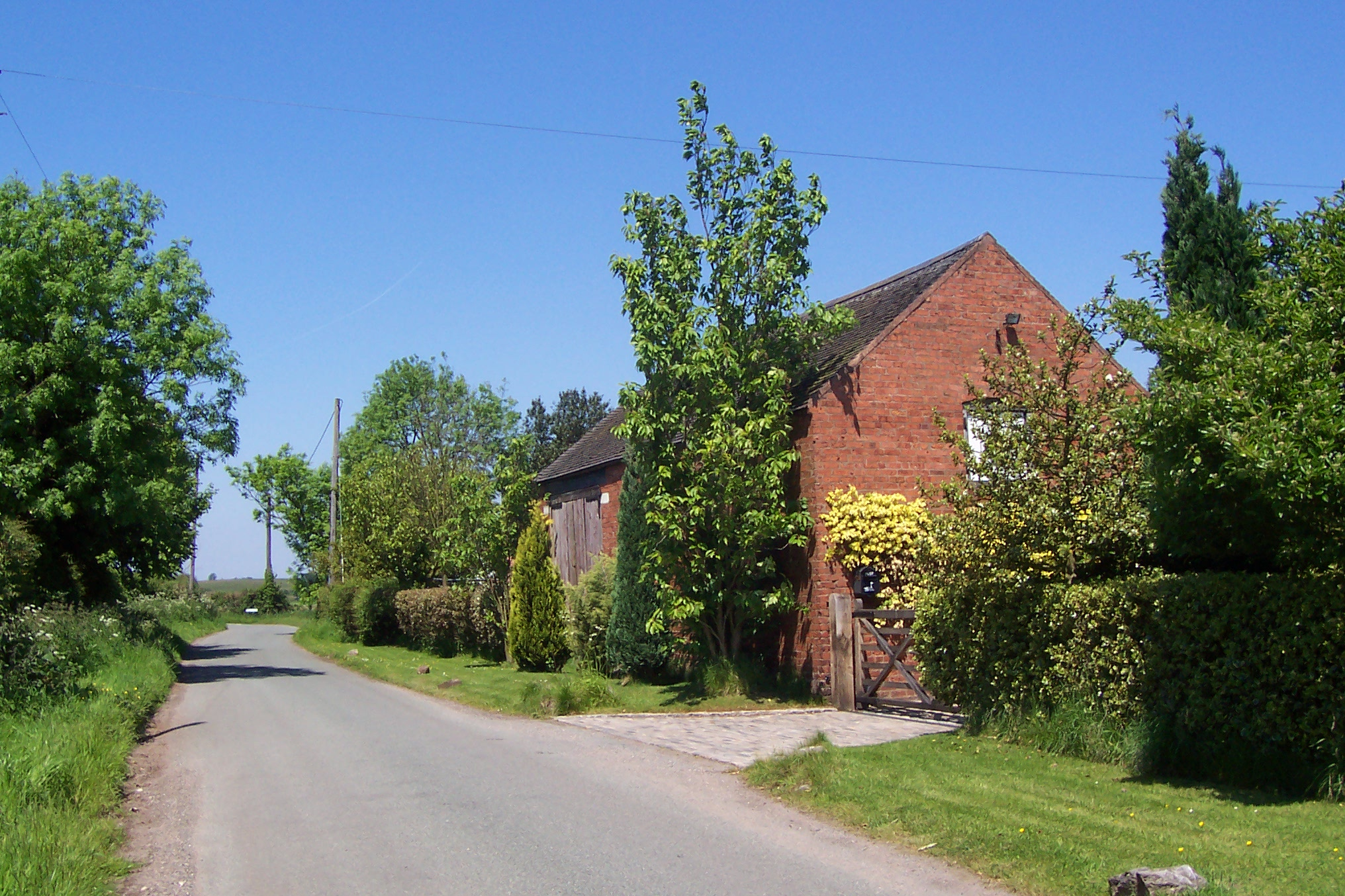
Lower Stonnall.

The Manor House at Lazy Hill was built by Rowland Fryth of Thornes Hall in the early 18th century and was the former public house and inn known as the Swan Inn. Originally, it was built to compete with the Welsh Harp for coaching route business.

== Other buildings in Stonnall ==
Stonnall has a small collection of shops, two public houses, (the Royal Oak and The Swan), a village hall and St Peter's C of E Primary School. There are also many residential buildings and some farm buildings, with the Sandhills water pumping station, owned by South Staffordshire Water, located just outside the village. There is also a park and the Youth and Community Centre.

== A notable landmark ==
Stonnall features an isolated beech tree on top of Grove Hill. Known as the Stonnall Tree, it has been the cause of endless fascination and speculation for over a hundred years and has become a village icon.

== Drainage ==
Pen Brook rises at the Fox Covey on Castle Hill and flows through Stonnall Gorse and alongside Lazy Hill Road where it then enters a series of culverts at Chester Road. The brook is visible on the eastern side of the playing fields and again where it emerges from the last culvert at the Wall Heath fields.

== Public transport ==
Stonnall is served by hourly Chaserider service 36 which runs between Walsall, Aldridge and Lichfield. Previously this service was operated by Midland Rider as 991 then by Central Buses and Diamond Bus as route 35B. Select Bus took over and curtailed the route from Lichfield to Aldridge only. However this was recently extended back to Walsall following the takeover by Chaserider. The nearest railway station is at Shenstone.

== Notable people ==
Sidney John Genders, who in 1970 was the first person to row single-handedly across the Atlantic, was born in Lynn in 1919.

== See also ==
- Listed buildings in Shenstone, Staffordshire

== Gallery ==
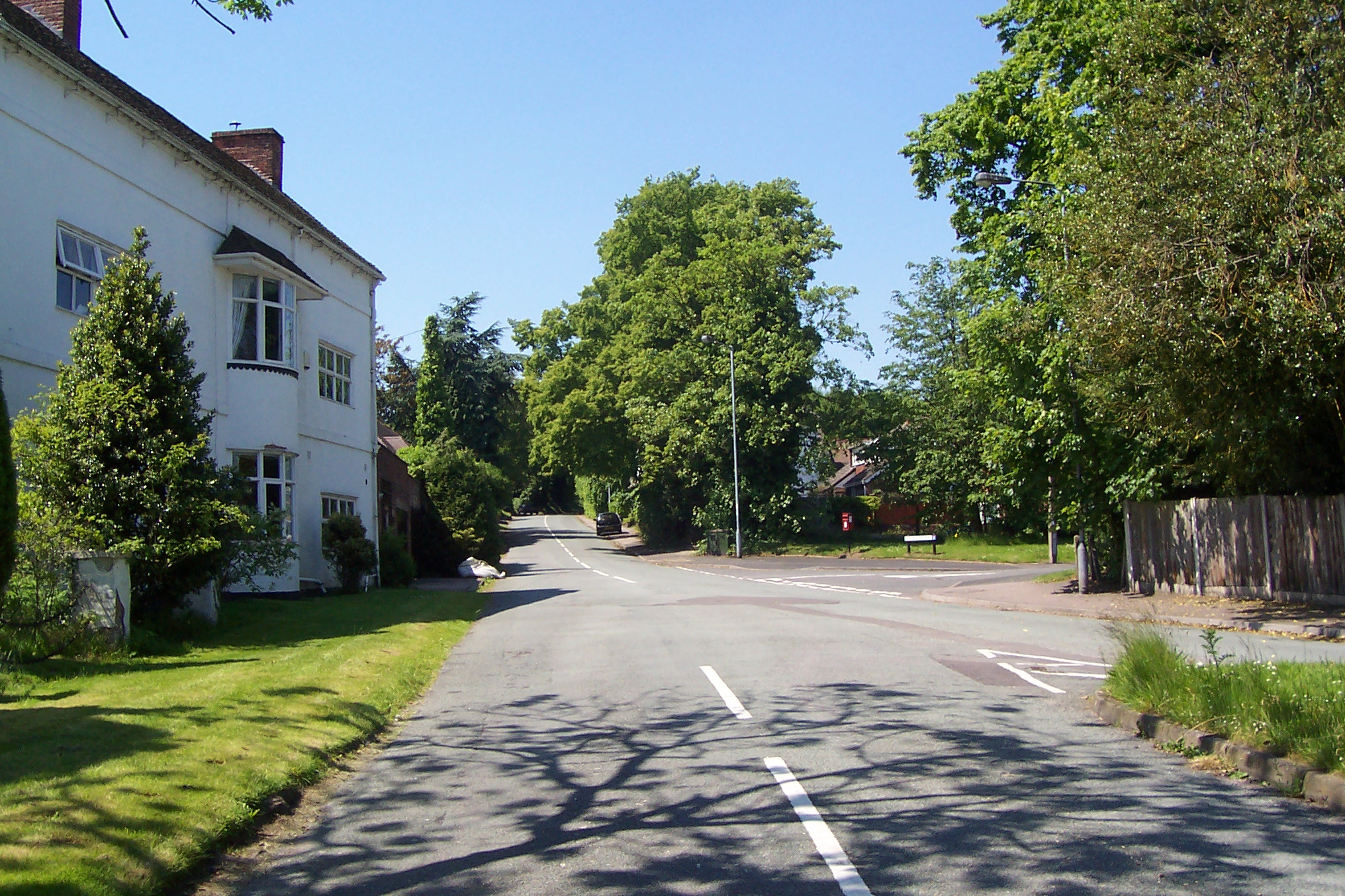
A view of Upper Stonnall.

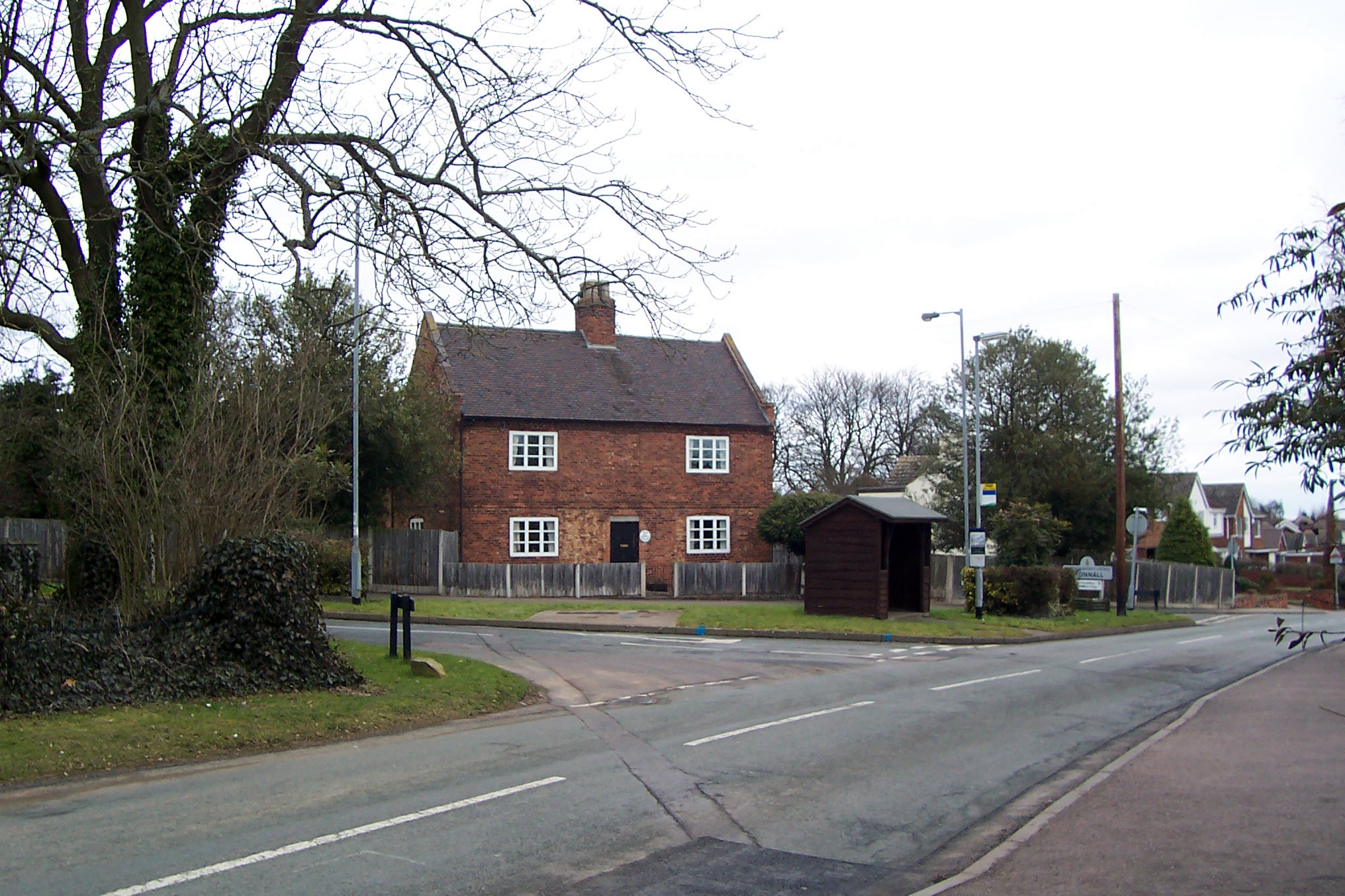
Elm Cottage.

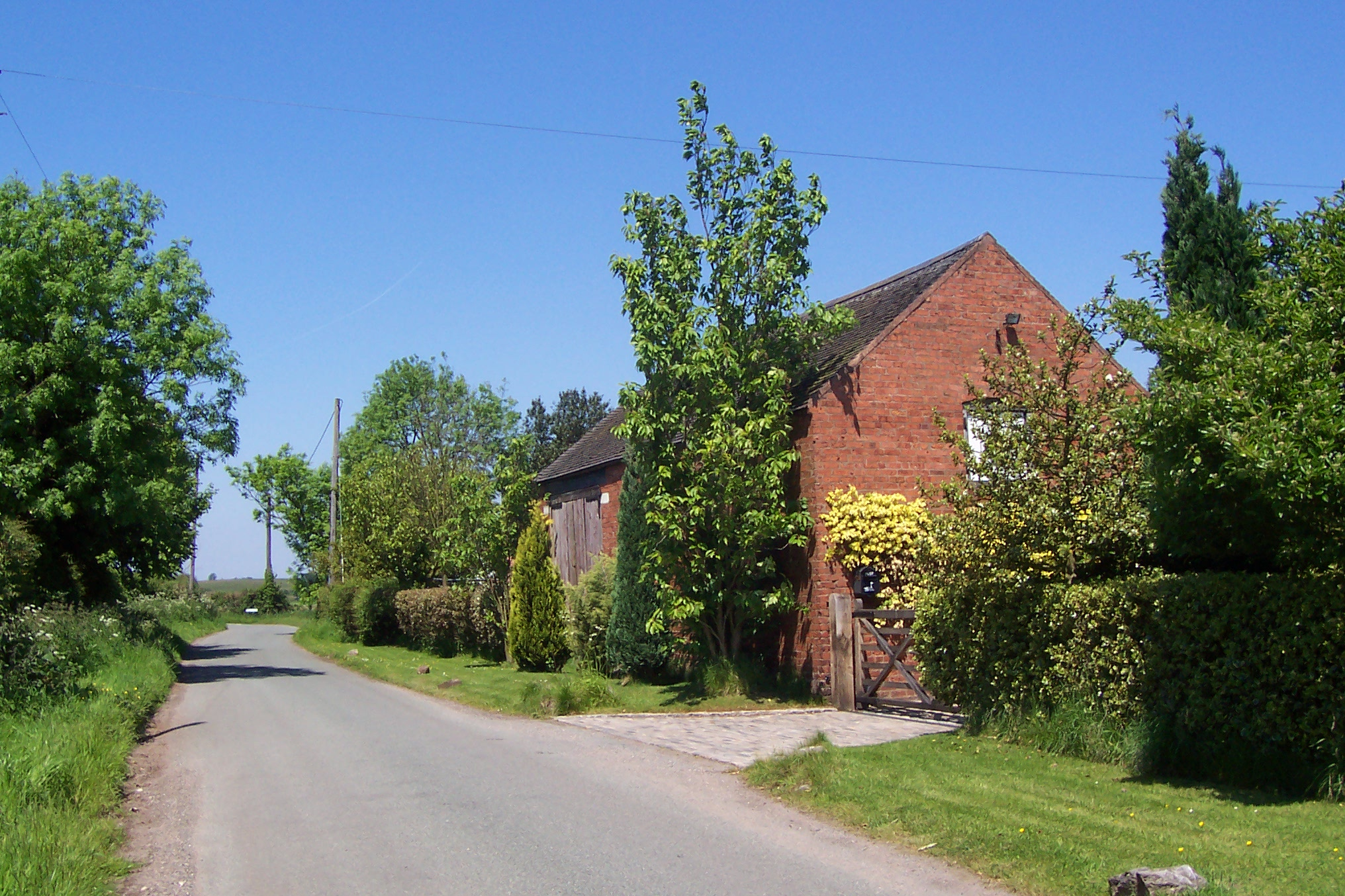
A view of Lower Stonnall.

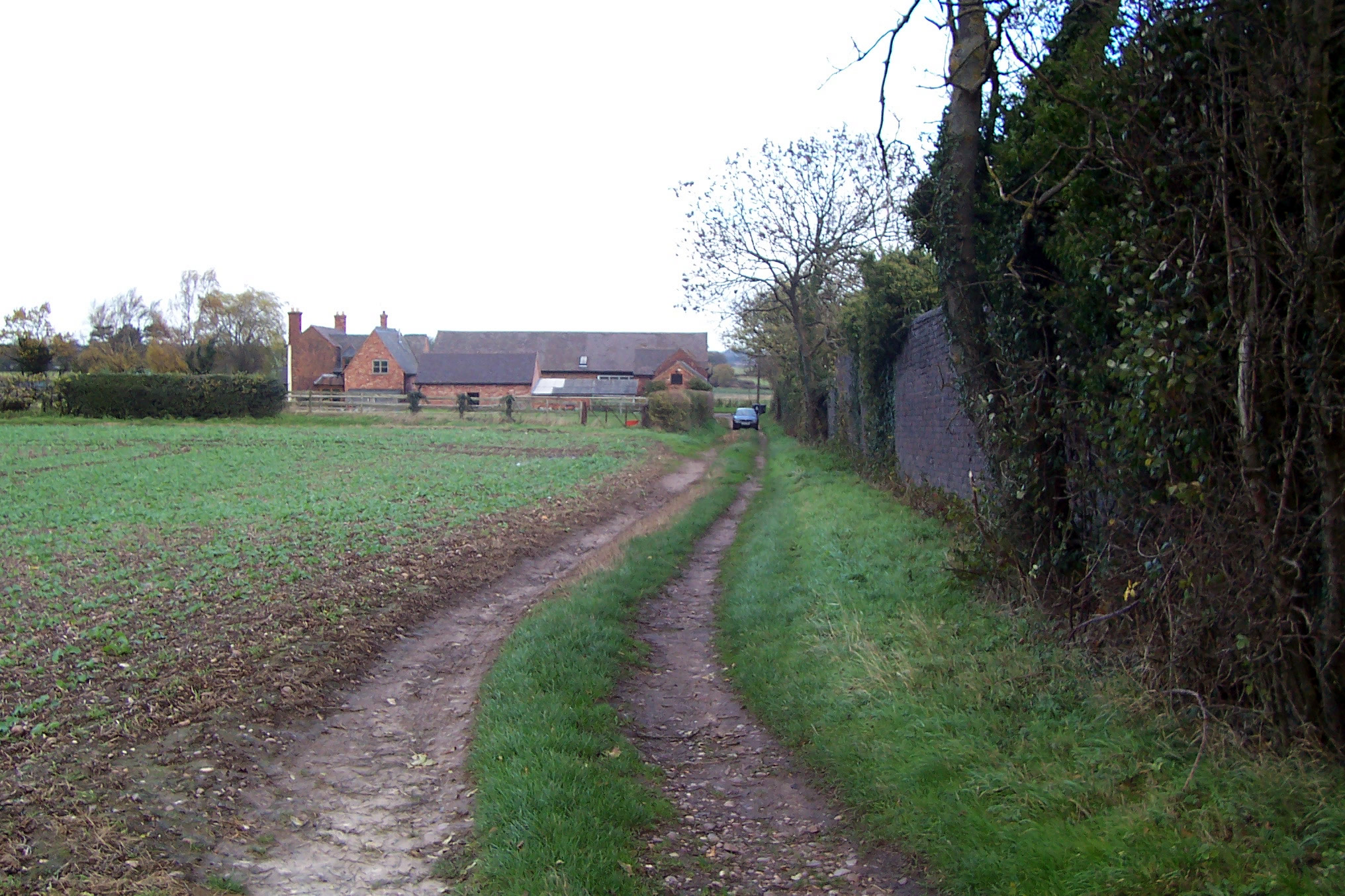
Back Lane, Lower Stonnall, an unadopted road.

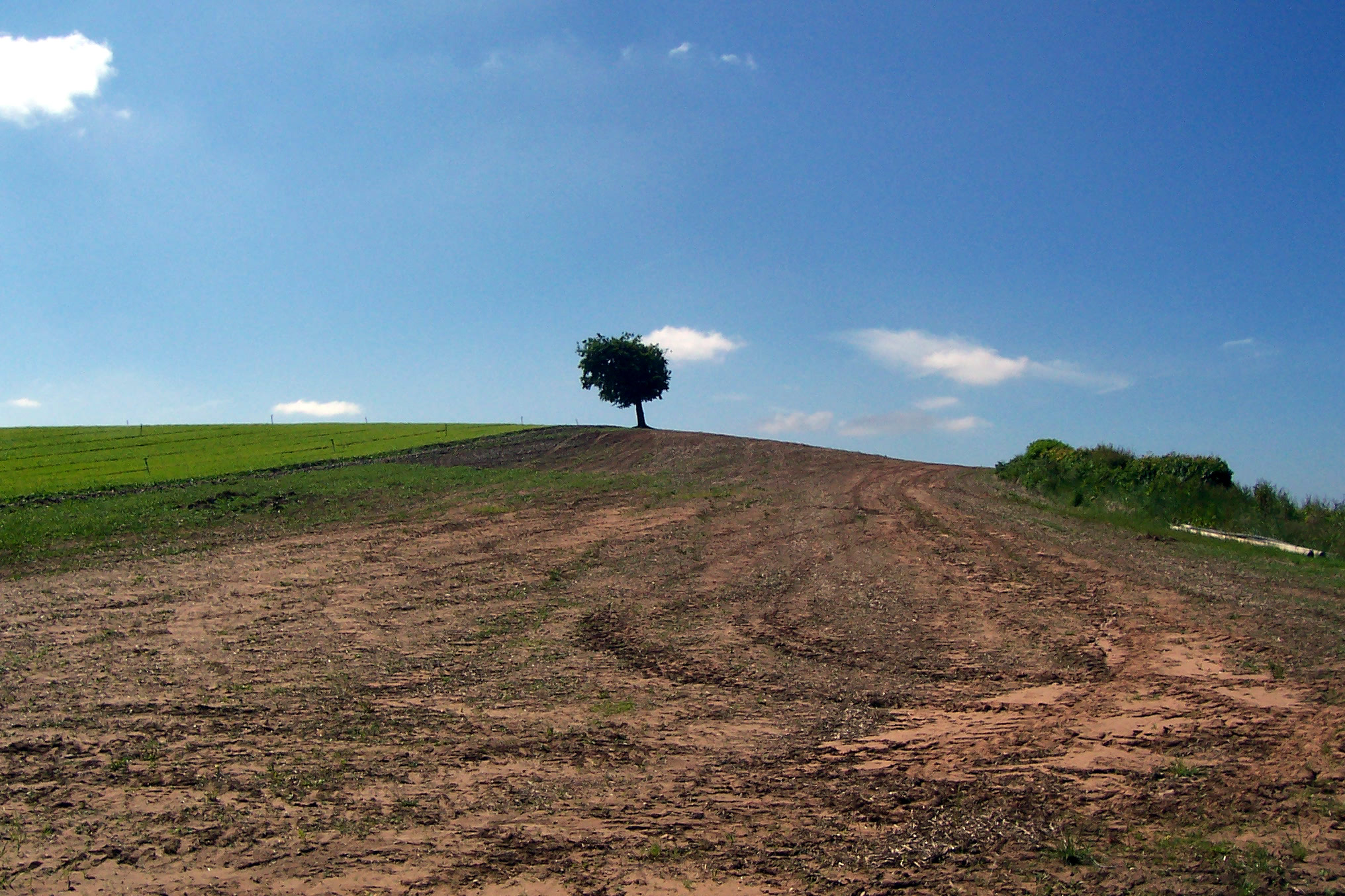
Grove Hill and the Stonnall Tree.

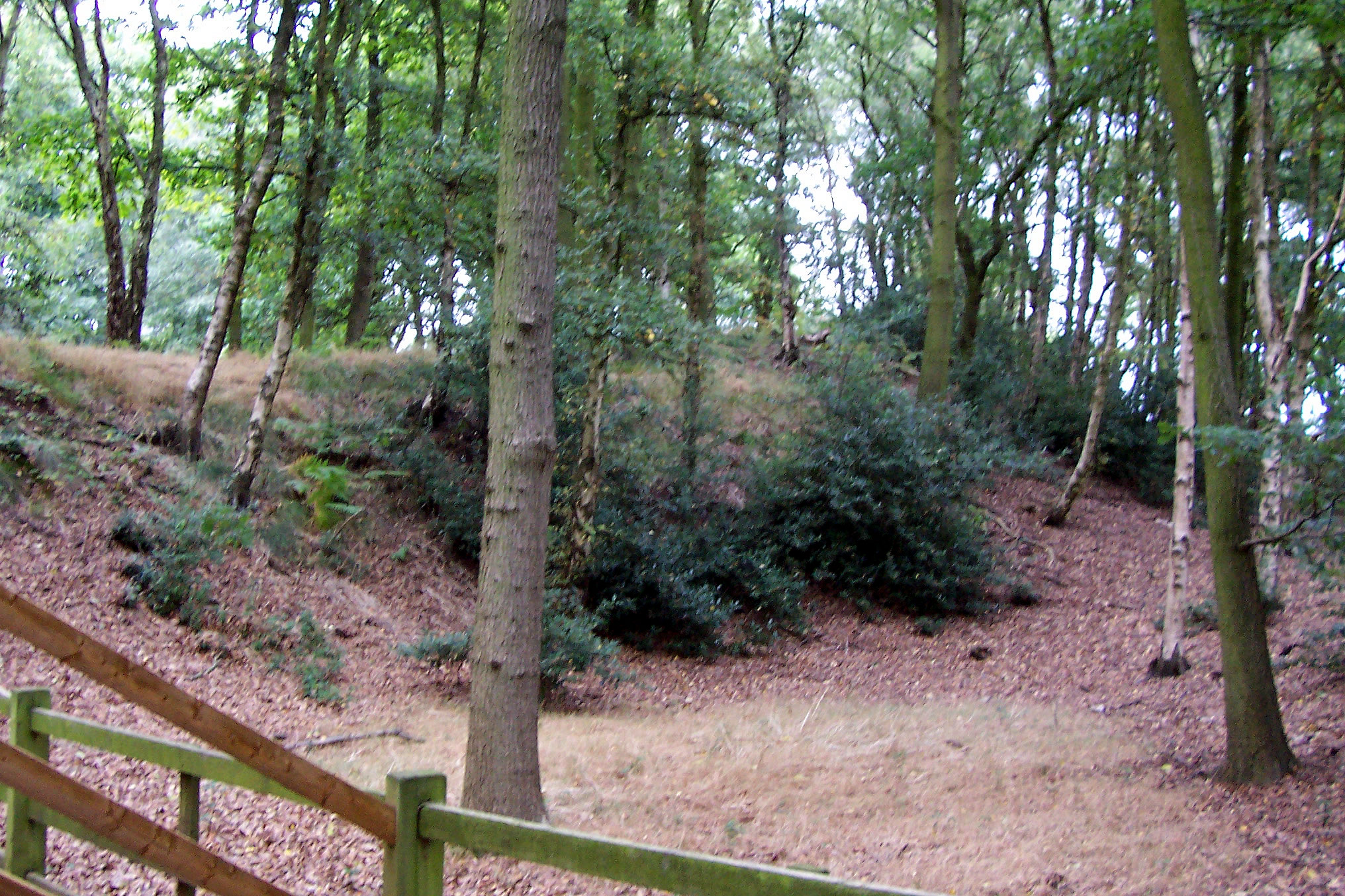
Part of the hill fort's defensive bank.

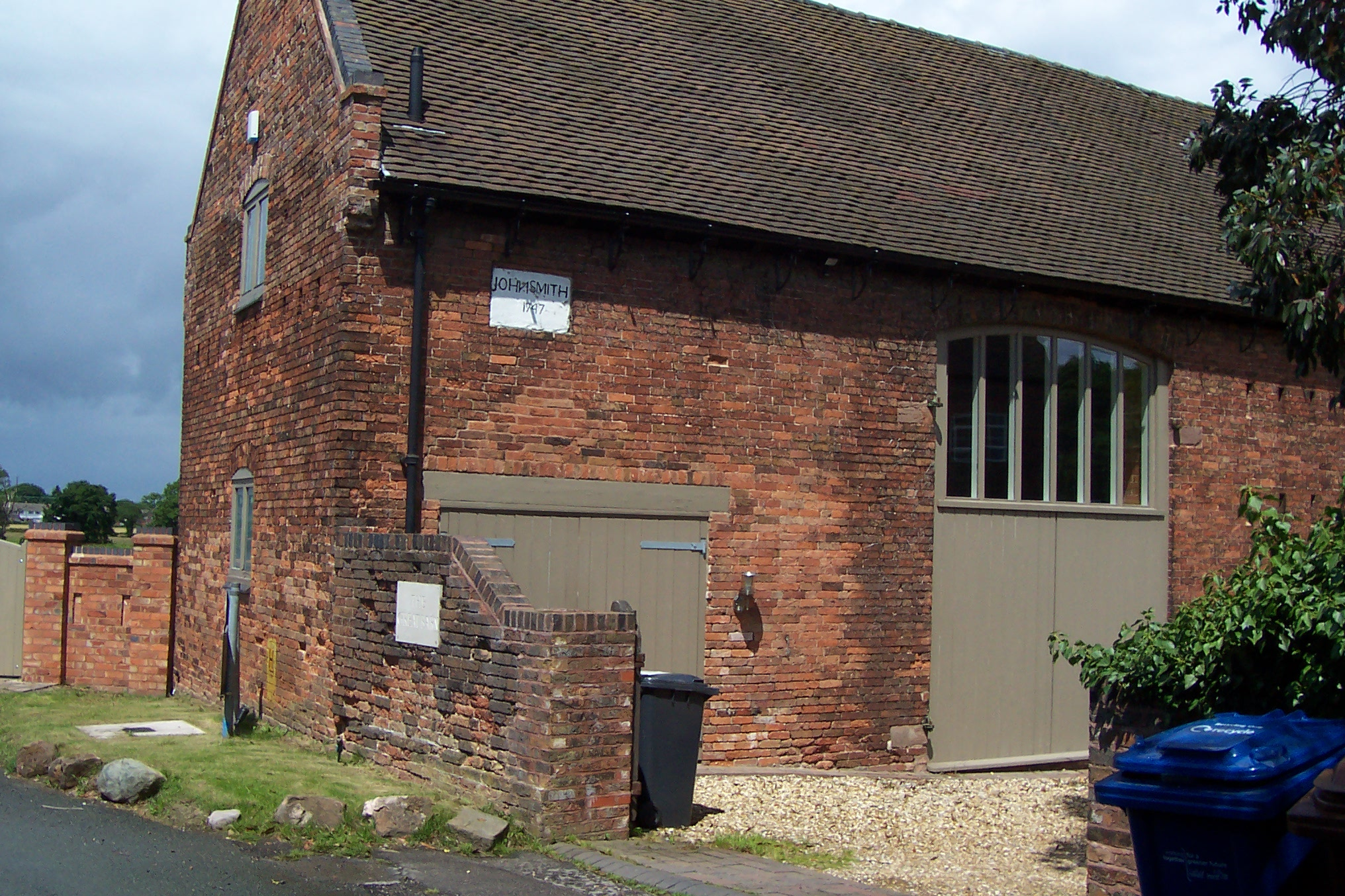
The John Smith barn, Lower Stonnall.

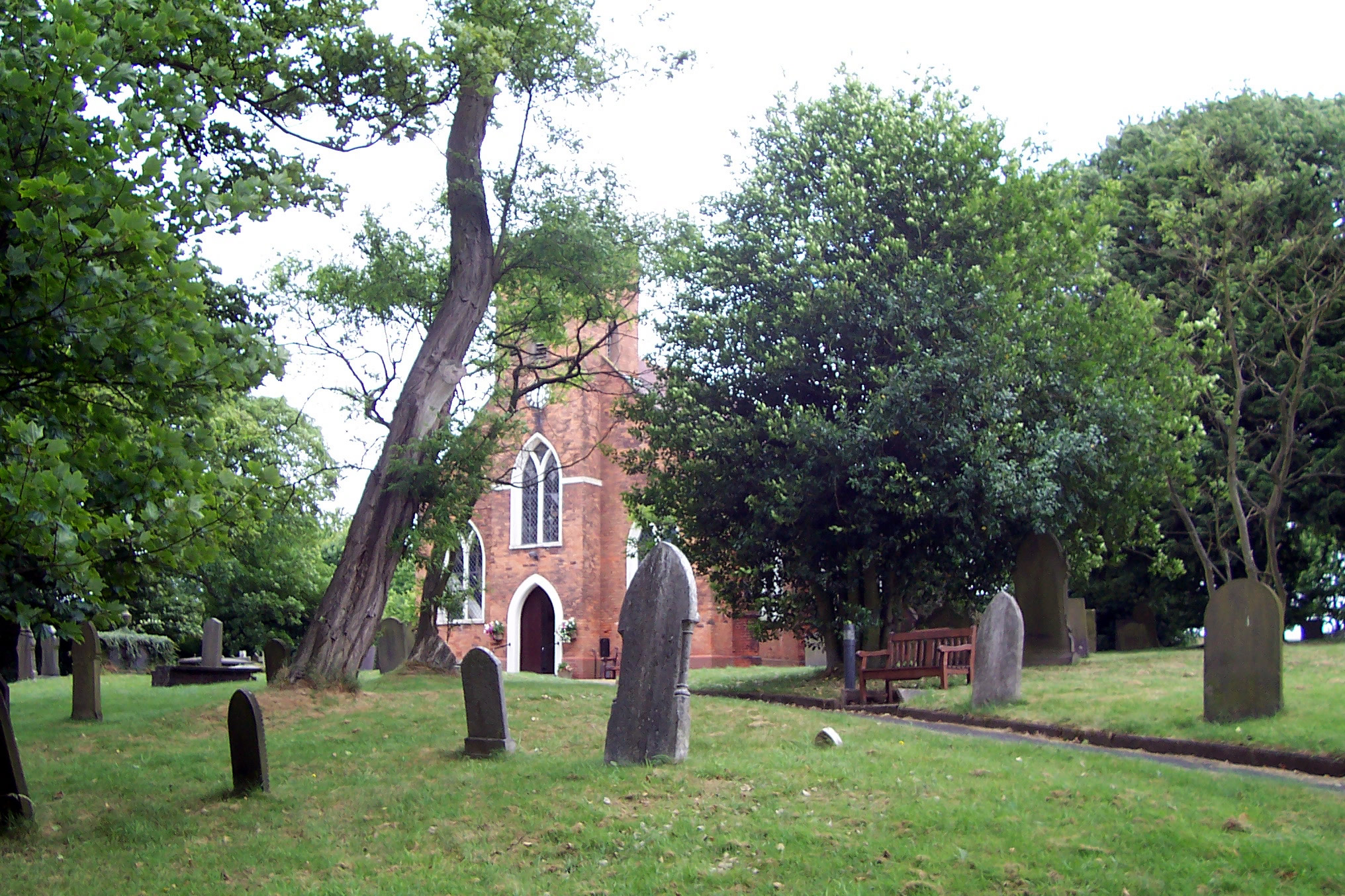
St Peter's Church.

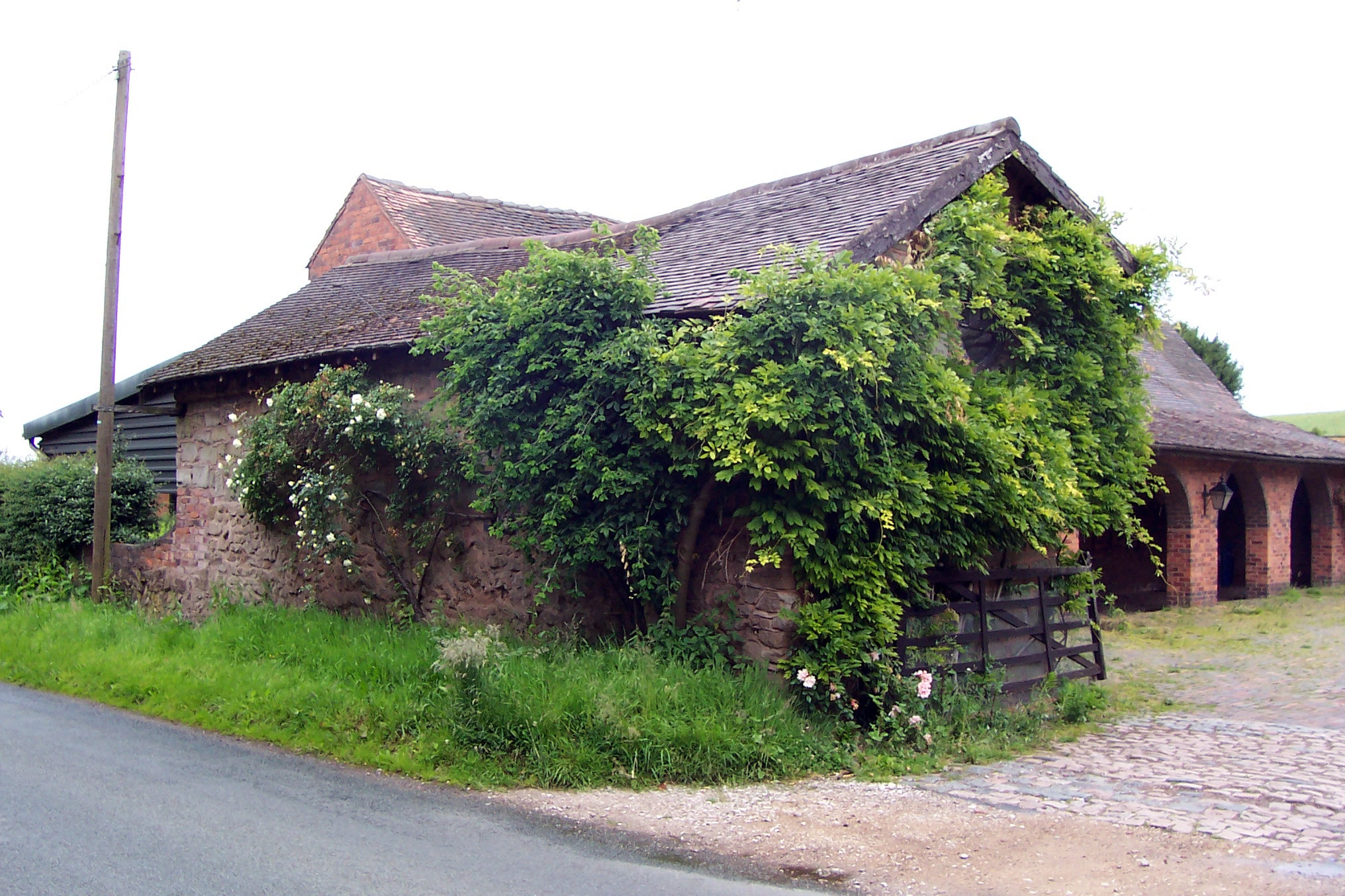
The barn at Thornes Hall Farm.

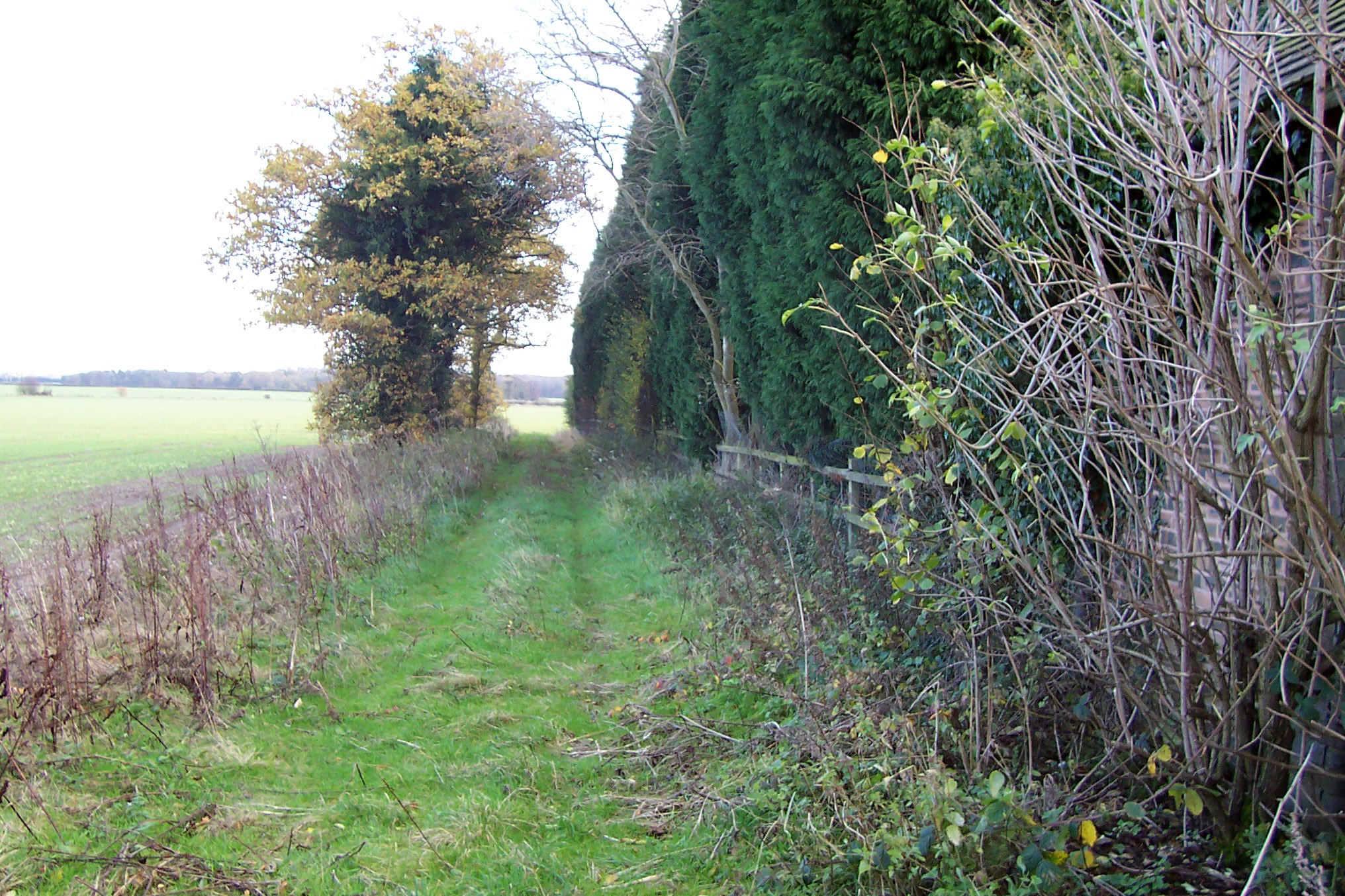
Twenty Acre Lane, Lower Stonnall, an unadopted road.

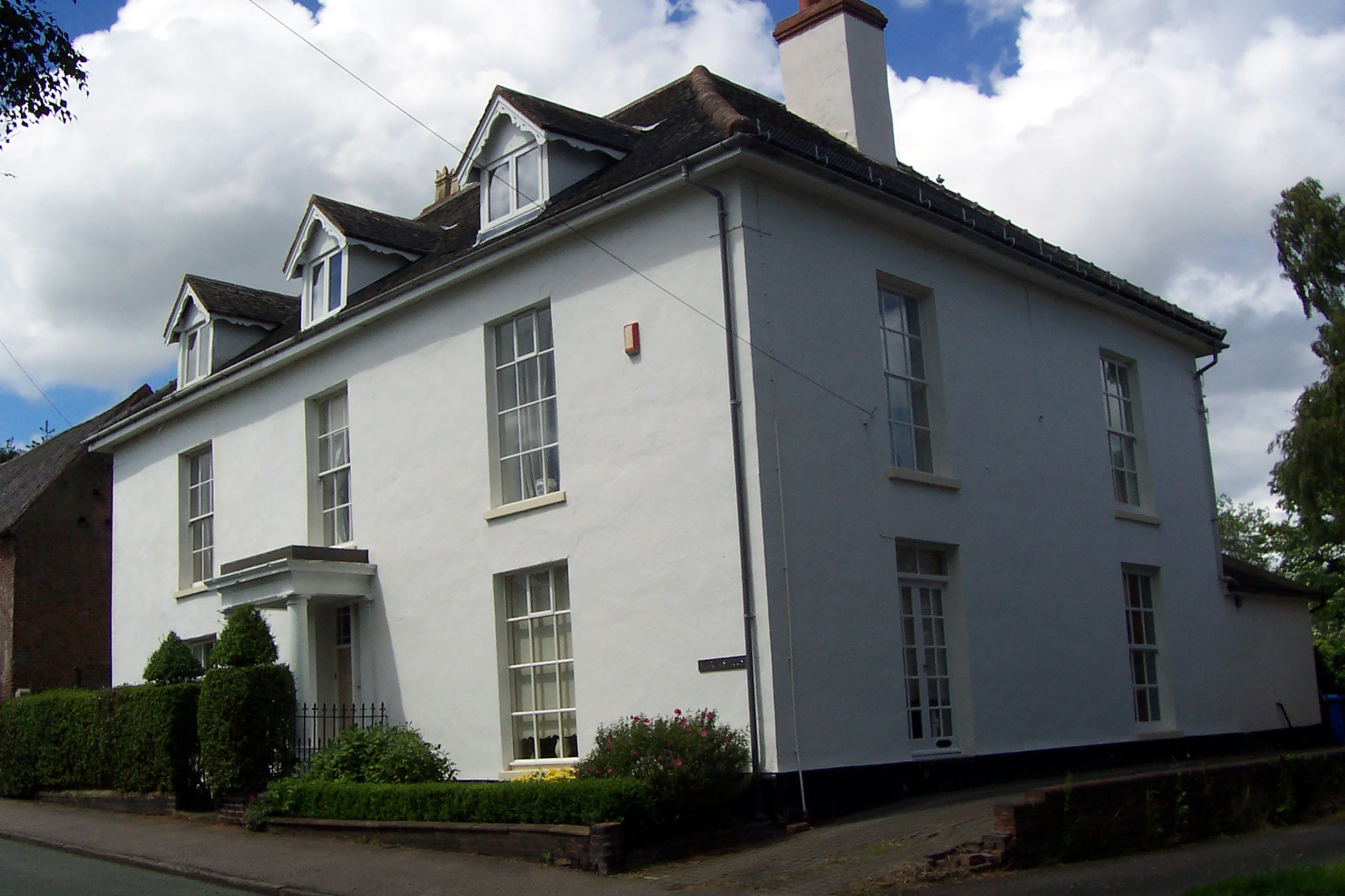
Wordsley House.

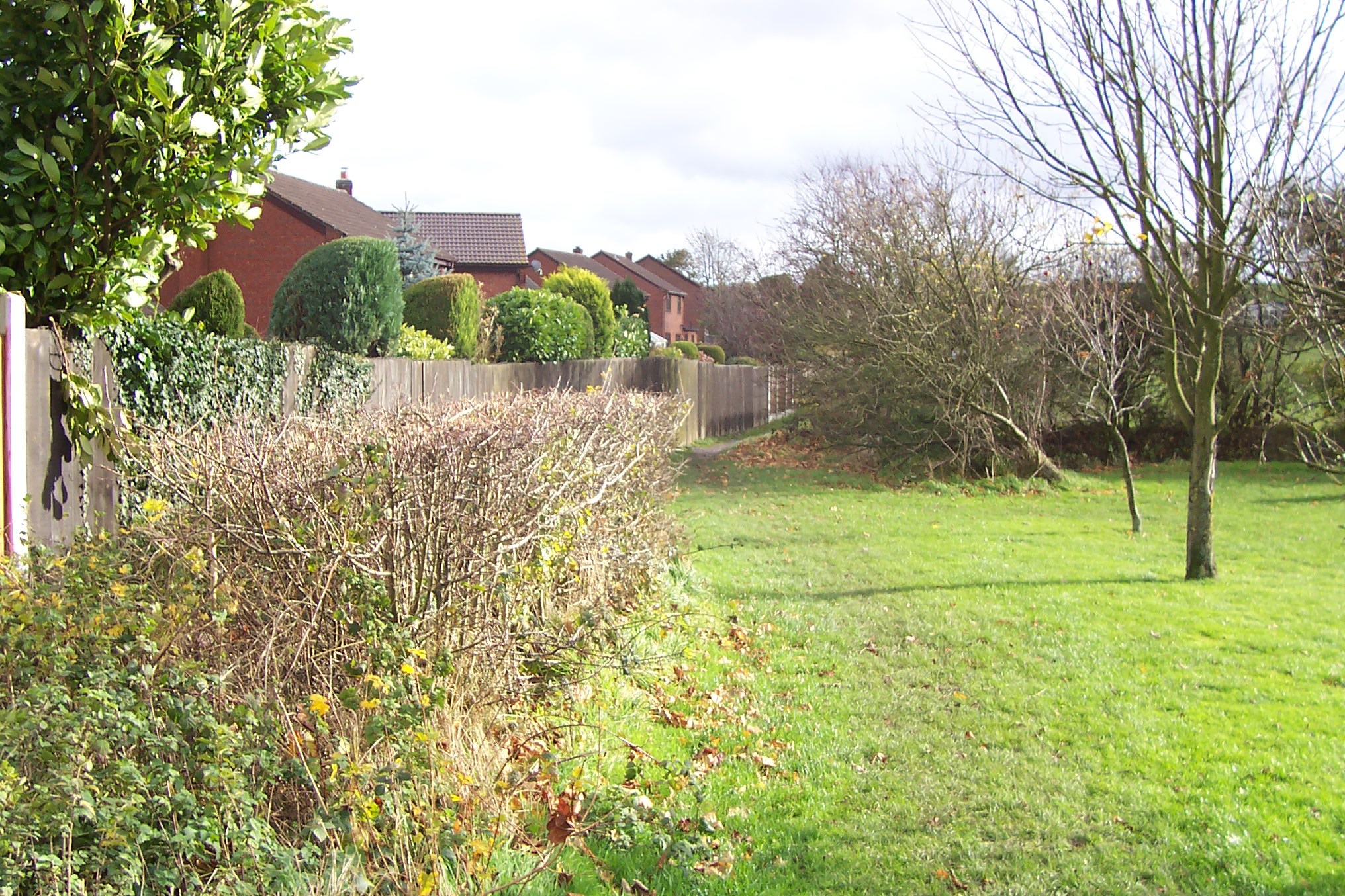
The Jubilee Walk.

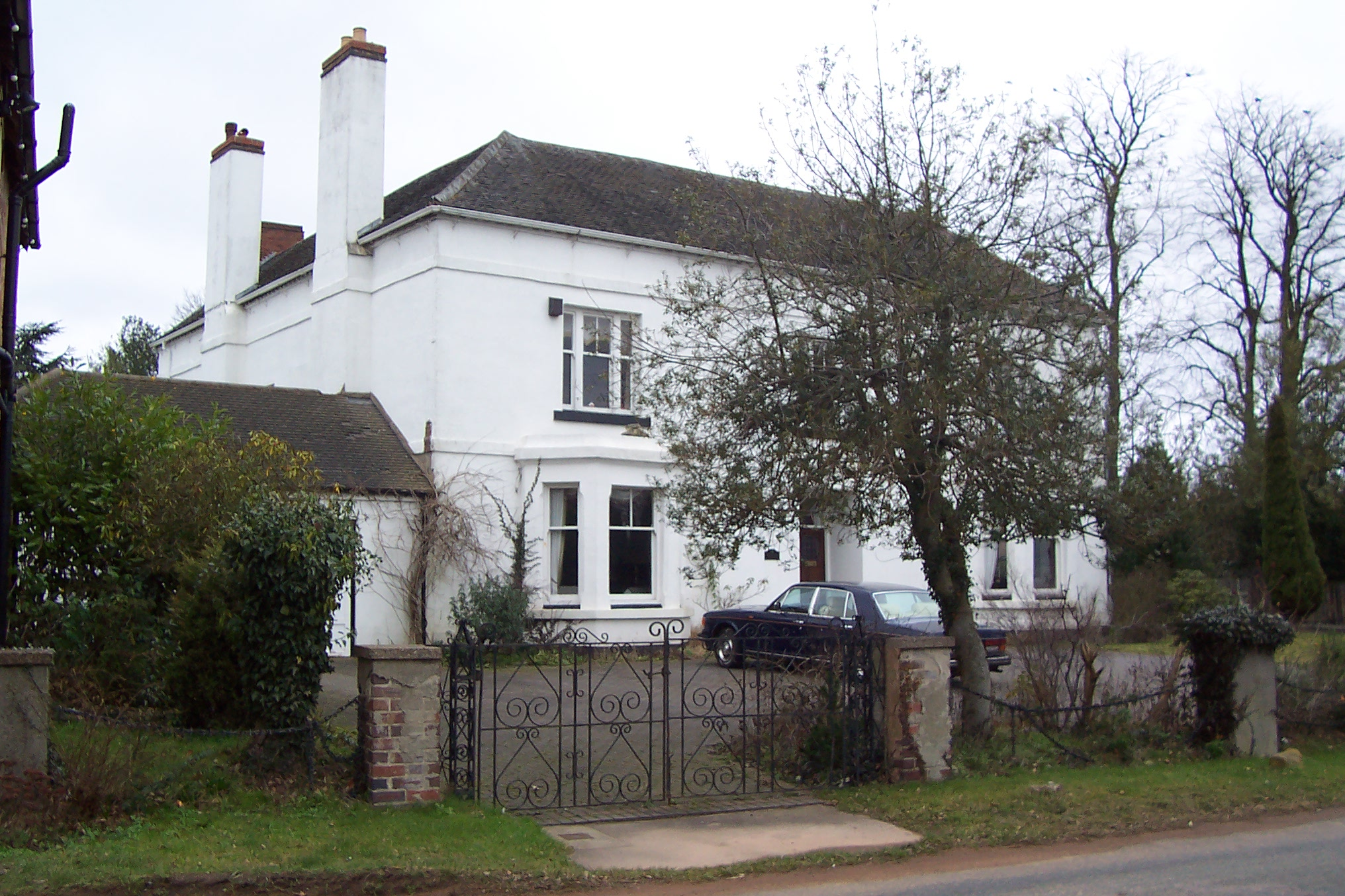
The Manor House.
