= Derby Racecourse =

Horse racing venue in Derby, England

Derby
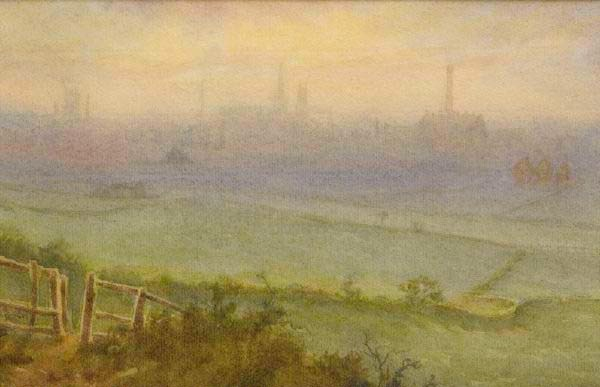
- The racecourse, painted in 1913 by Alfred John Keene
- Location: Derby, Derbyshire, England
- Coordinates: 52°55′45″N 1°27′42″W
- Owned by: Derby Corporation
- Operated by: Derby Recreation Company
- Date opened: 1847 (at Nottingham Road)
- Date closed: 1939

Derby Racecourse is a former horse racing venue in Derby, England, from 1848 to 1939. It was preceded by two earlier courses, at different locations.

== Earlier courses ==
It is unknown exactly when horse racing first started in Derby, although a reference to racing in the town occurs in the play Monsieur Thomas, published in 1639. Races associated with fairs were probably held at a variety of locations, perhaps including Nuns' Green in the modern West End. Sinfin Moor, located some way south of Derby, was being used by the early 18th century – probably by 1707 and certainly by 1733, although racing still took place elsewhere as well.

By 1748, Sinfin Moor had become established as the fixed venue for racing in Derby, with a prefabricated grandstand being erected. Racing was becoming increasingly fashionable, and meetings were held in conjunction with entertainments in the Assembly Rooms and various public houses in the town. On a number of occasions, however, waterlogging forced race meetings to be moved to The Holmes, close to the centre of Derby on the south bank of the River Derwent. This, combined with the process of enclosure into fields of the previously open Moor, led by the end of the 18th century to the course being permanently moved to The Holmes, where a "handsome and commodious" grandstand was built. With the arrival and expansion of the railways in the area, this site eventually became impractical, and was last used in 1844.

== 1848 course ==
The final Derby Racecourse, which featured a straight mile, opened in May 1848 on land off the Nottingham Road, east of Little Chester and west of Chaddesden. A grandstand designed by Henry Duesbury was built in 1852, and in 1856 the Midland Railway opened Nottingham Road station to serve the course. In 1863, the South Derbyshire Cricket Club also moved to the venue from The Holmes, and a cricket ground was constructed within the southern curve of the racecourse. The Racecourse Ground, as it was initially known, later became the County Cricket Ground after the Derbyshire County Cricket Club started playing there in 1871. The Racecourse Ground was also a football venue; it was the home of Derby County F.C. from 1884 until 1895, and hosted an FA Cup Final replay and an England international match as well.

The Duesbury grandstand was replaced in 1911 by a "larger but far less elegant building" with a distinctive domed roof. Like its predecessor, the stand served spectators for cricket as well as racing. The final race meeting at Derby took place on 9 August 1939, with Gordon Richards riding one of the last winners. Following the outbreak of the Second World War, the Racecourse was taken over for military use by the Royal Artillery, and anti-aircraft guns were positioned on the site. The Derby Recreation Company, who leased the land from the Corporation, were given notice in 1942 that the lease would not be renewed after 1945. After the War, the town council confirmed that racing would not be resumed in Derby, as it would "bring the wrong sort of people into the town".

== After closure ==
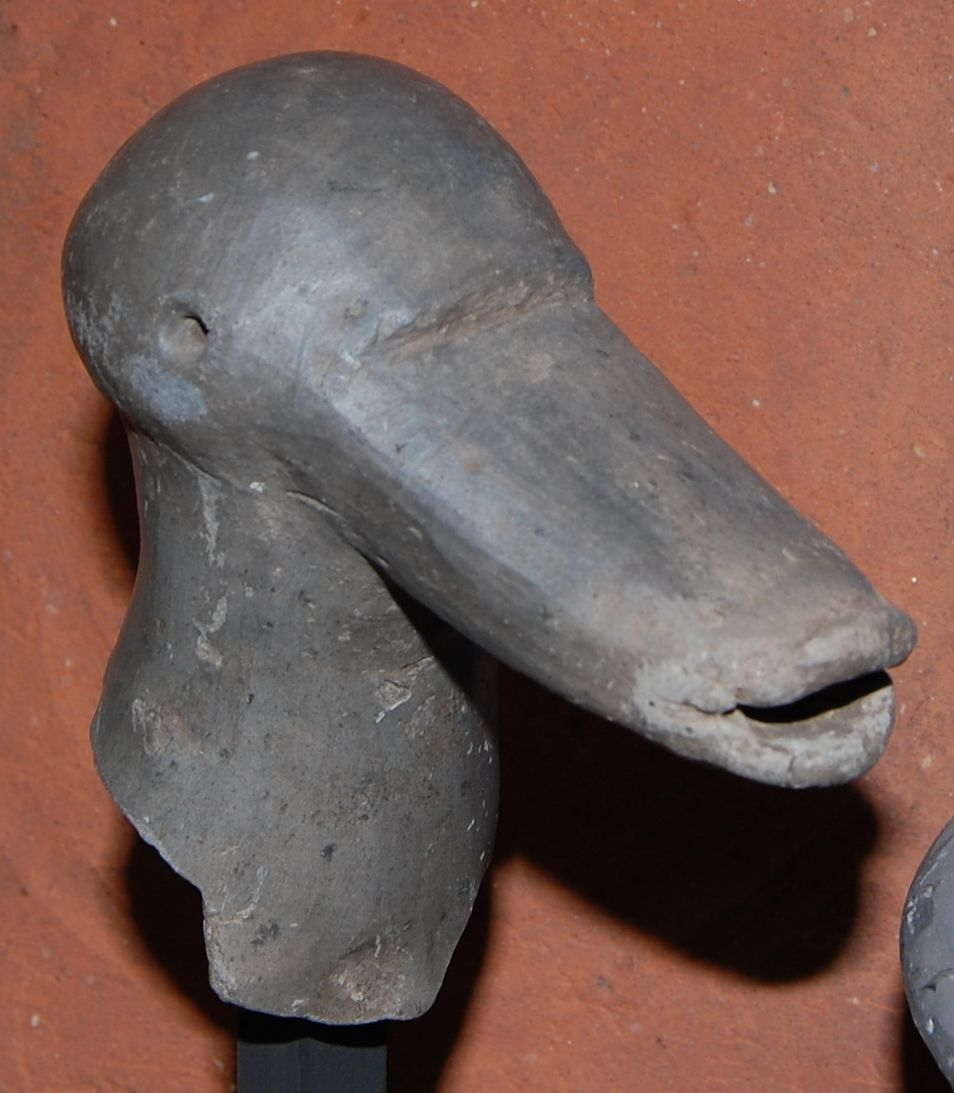
Roman spout in shape of a Duck's head, found at Derby racecourse and now at Derby Museum and Art Gallery

Following the closure of the Racecourse, the land was retained by the council for public recreation and partially converted into football pitches. The area is still known as the Racecourse Playing Fields. The County Cricket Ground also remained on the site, and in 1955 the cricket field was moved eastwards and closer to the grandstand.

The stand itself – along with its public house, the Grandstand Hotel – continued in use up until 1998, but became extremely dilapidated in later years and was demolished in 2001. Its site is now occupied by the ground's Gateway Centre. Other racing-related structures, such as the old stables and judges' box, were adapted for use by the cricket club, but have also been lost to 21st century redevelopment. The last remaining racecourse feature, the jockeys' quarters, was demolished in 2009.

A Roman settlement, now known as Derby Racecourse Roman settlement, was previously on the site. Archaeological excavations took place in 1974.
