= Derby Racecourse Roman settlement =

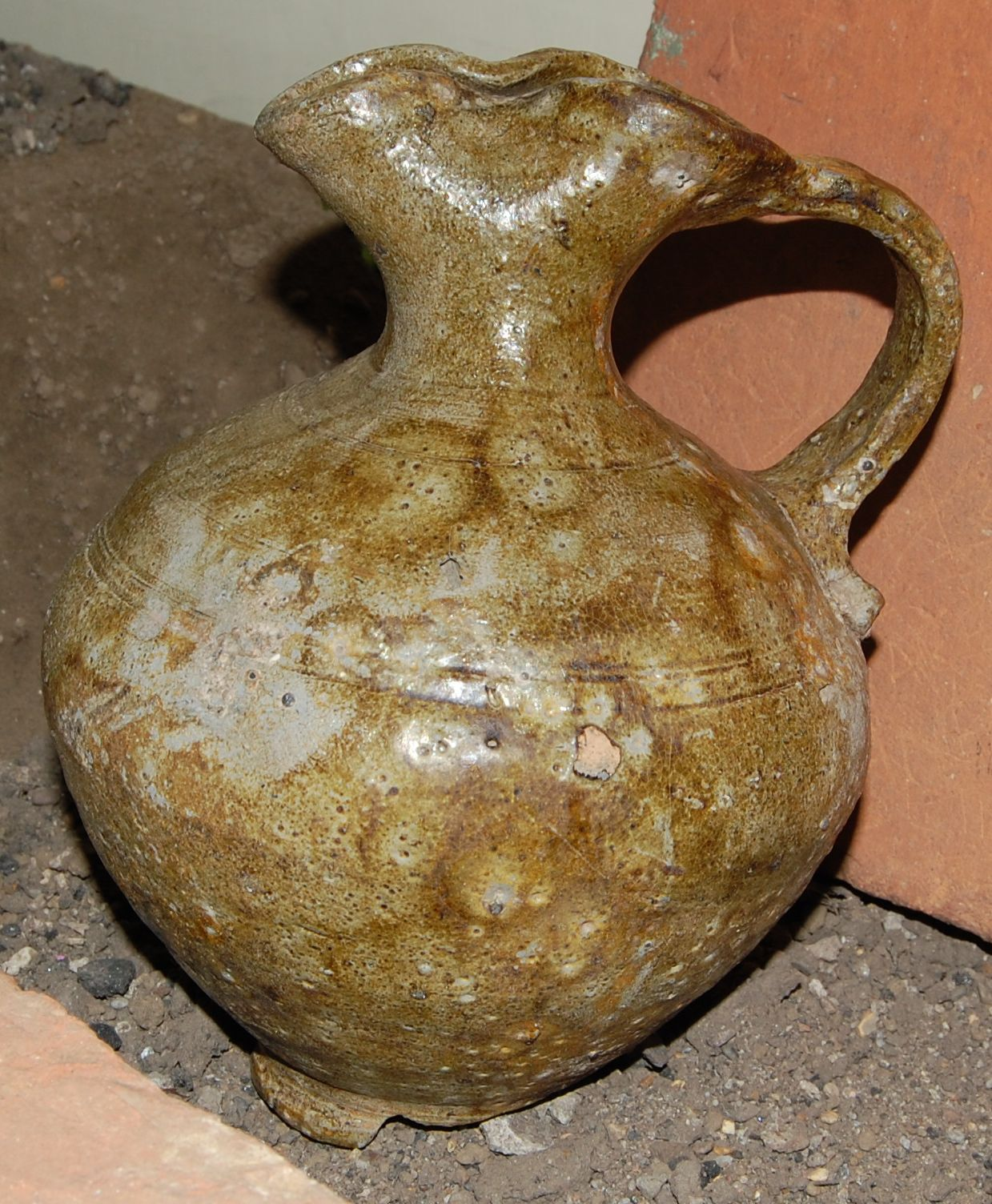
- A Green Glazed Jug from the Racecourse settlement

- Map showing the location of Derby Racecourse Roman settlement within Derbyshire.
- 52.934672°N 1.463546°W
- Type: Roman fort
- Location: Derby, Derbyshire
- Region: East Midlands
- Part of: Icknield Street

History
- Built: 120

Site notes
- Website: www.roman-britain.org/places/derventio_coritanorum.htm

The Derby Racecourse Roman settlement was the third settlement in Derby or Derventio which was a small town in the Roman province of Britannia. It lies 600m east of Derventio fort in Little Chester, on the outskirts of Derby, in the English county of Derbyshire. The Roman road from Derventio to Sawley on the River Trent passes the settlement. It is a scheduled National Monument.

== Description ==
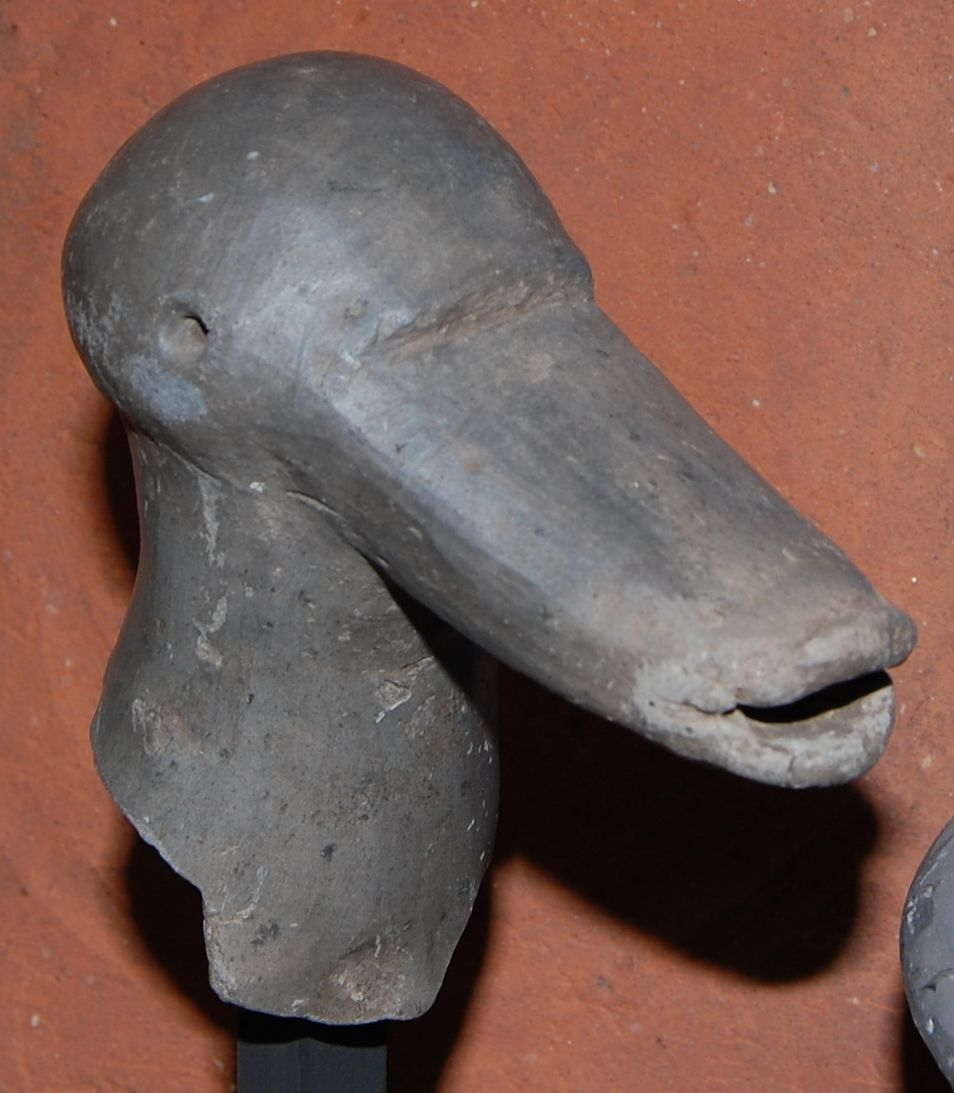
Roman spout in shape of a Duck's head, found at Derby racecourse and now at Derby Museum and Art Gallery

The first Roman fort in the area was built on the opposite bank of the River Derwent at Strutt's Park. It was replaced about AD 80 by a fort at Little Chester, but this only lasted about forty years, then decommissioned. The fort was later re-occupied and re-used for a further twenty five years then unoccupied until the late 3rd century when a stone wall was built around the town. There is evidence of extensive Roman activity in Little Chester. Derby Racecourse Roman settlement site was founded around AD 90. It is considered by English Heritage to be an import example of a fort-vicus. This was a civilian settlement attached to a Roman military fort- in this case Derventio. It is a mark that the Cornovii tribesmen were accepting the Roman way of life and integrating themselves into the Roman economy- i.e. Romanisation.

Pottery kilns have been discovered dating from AD90 to the mid second century when ironworking took place. The jug illustrated was fired at this settlement and is now in Derby Museum. There was also a large cemetery with five stone mausolea.

== History ==
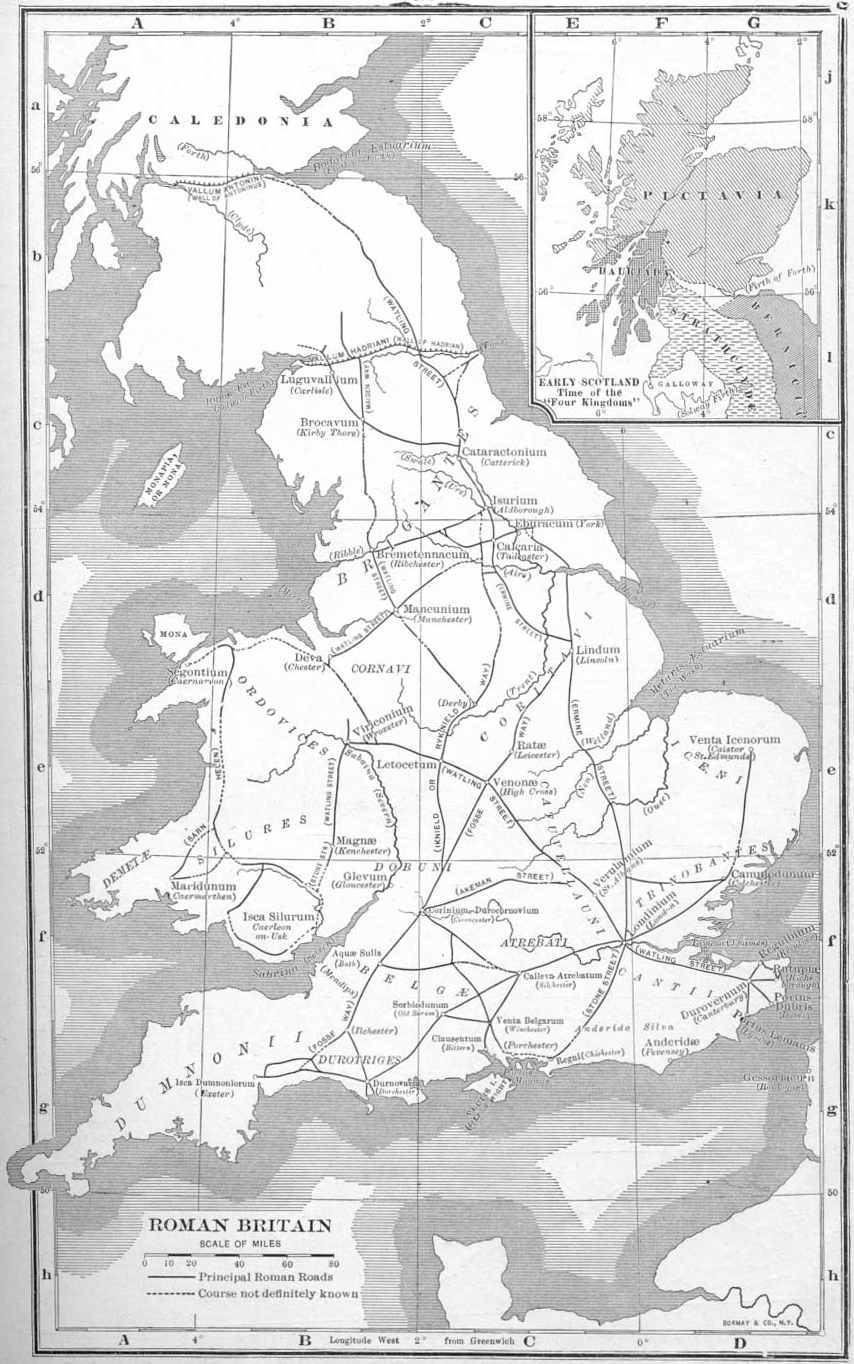

This part of Britannica was occupied by a tribe known as the Cornovii. In AD 46–47 the Roman Army under the direction of governor Aulius Plautius had probably occupied the lands to the south of the River Trent, so in AD 50 this was the front line. There is a shortage of written documentation about these years so reliance is made on archaeological excavations. Late in 47 the new governor of Britain, Ostorius Scapula, began a campaign against the tribes of modern-day Wales, and the Cheshire Gap. During these times Strutt's Park Roman fort, was one of the new forts built along the new supply road from Wroxeter to Rossington.

The campaign to conquer the Silures continued under the governor Quintus Veranius and his successor Gaius Suetonius Paulinus but by now Strutt Park's rôle was to maintain the peace. Around AD 74, the lands north of the River Mersey became unstable, when Queen Cartimandua had to ask for Roman assistance to fight off a rebellion. Then in AD78, Gnaeus Julius Agricola, made famous through the highly laudatory biography of him written by his son-in-law, Tacitus, was made governor. He consolidated the forts, improved the road infrastructure and led some now well documented campaigns- firstly in AD78, he reconquered North Wales, then in AD79 he conquered the Brigantes and Parisi taking all of Northern England up to the present Scottish border. Strutt's Park fort was vacated in AD 80 when Derventio was built.

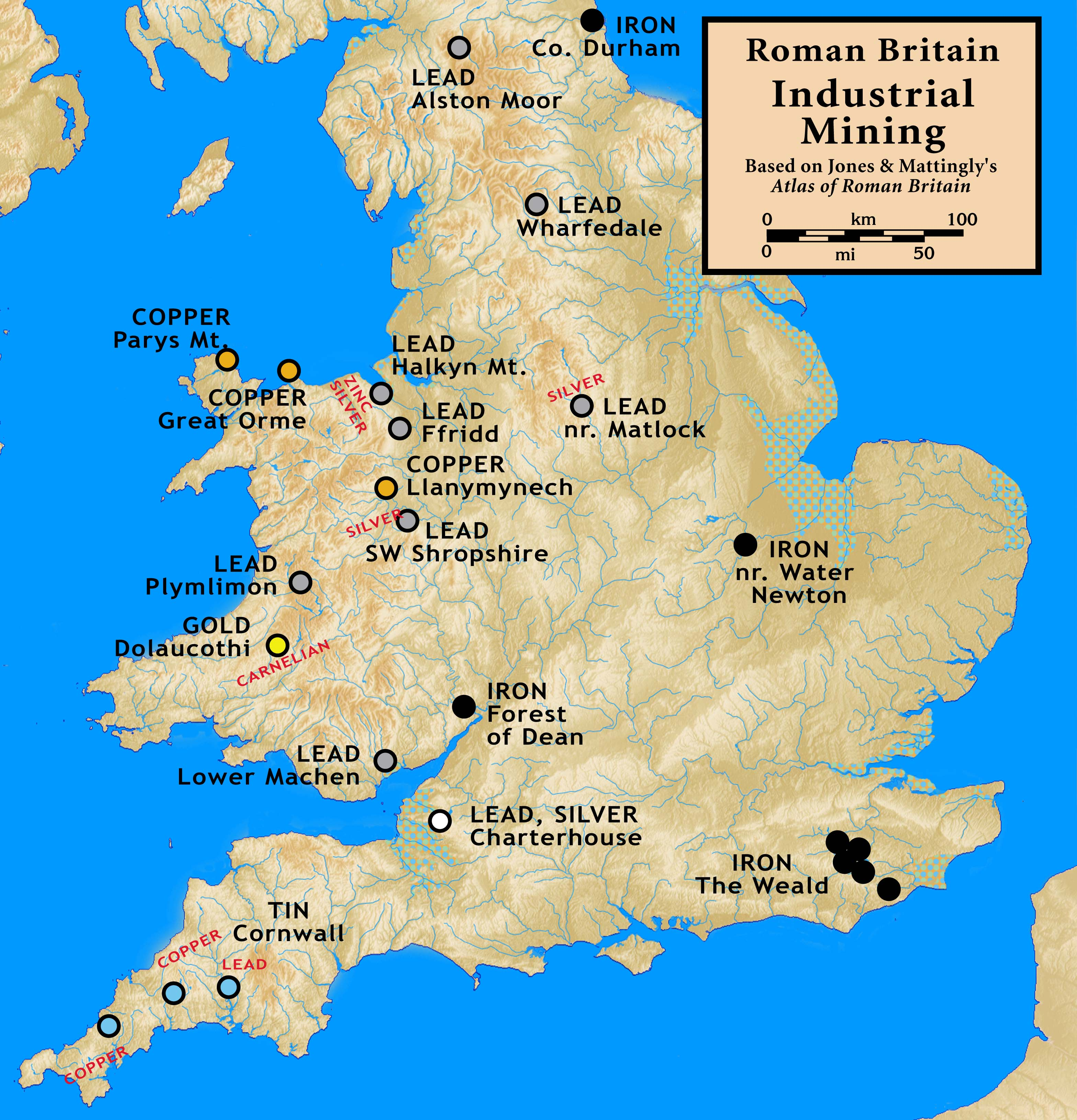

The Emperor Hadrian visited Britannia in AD120 and ordered his wall to be built. Though Britannia always had a large garrison, focus now changed to industrial production. Derby produced pottery and had access to the lead mining to the north in the Peak District, later it became a centre for metalworking. This continued for the next 200 years.

== Excavations ==
The site was excavated between 1968 and 1983.

== Bibliography ==
- M. Brassington (1971). "A Trajanic kiln-complex near Little Chester, Derby". Antiquaries Journal. 51: 36–69. doi:10.1017/s0003581500019144.
- M. Brassington (1981). "The Roman roads of Derby". Derbyshire Archaeological Journal. 101: 88–92.
- M. Dearne (1991). "The military vici of the South Pennines: retrospect and prospect". In R. Hodges, K. Smith (ed.). Recent Developments in the Archaeology of the Peak District. Sheffield: Sheffield University Press. pp. 69–84. ISBN 978-0-906090-38-1.
- J. Dool, H. Wheeler; et al. (1986). "Roman Derby - Excavations 1968–1983". Derbyshire Archaeological Journal. 105, 1985.
- J. Dool (1986). "Roman Derby - Excavations 1968–1983". Derbyshire Archaeological Journal. 105, 1985: 155–221. - "Derby Racecourse: Excavations on the Roman Industrial Settlement, 1974"
- Vivien G. Swan (1984). The Pottery Kilns of Roman Britain. London: Royal Commission on the Historical Monuments of England. ISBN 978-0-11-701203-5.
