= Long Lane =

Long Lane may be:

- Long Lane, Gdańsk, Poland
- Long Lane, City of London, England
- Long Lane, Finchley, London, England
- Long Lane, Southwark, London, England
- Long Lane, Shropshire, England
- The Long Lane (Derbyshire), England, a Roman road
- Long Lane, Leicestershire, England, a historical name for the area of Coalville
- Long Lane, Missouri, U.S.

== See also ==
- Longlane (disambiguation)
