= Longlane =

Longlane may be:

- Longlane, Berkshire a small settlement in Berkshire, England.
- Longlane, Derbyshire, England
- Longlane, Missouri a small unincorporated village in Missouri, approximate population of 50, located in Dallas County, 40 miles north of Springfield Missouri, United States

== See also ==
- Long Lane (disambiguation)
