= Strutt's Park Roman Fort =

- Map showing the location of Strutt's Park within Derbyshire.
- 52.9317°N 1.4830°W
- Type: Roman fort
- Associated with: 3rd Cohort of Bracara Augustani
- Location: High Peak, Derbyshire
- Region: East Midlands

History
- Built: 50
- Abandoned: 80

Strutt's Park Roman Fort was a Roman fort in Strutt's Park, a suburb of Derby in Derbyshire, England. It was built around the year 50 and replaced, probably between the years 75 and 80, by a new fort at Little Chester on the opposite bank of the River Derwent.

== The site ==
The site of the fort was under the present day Duffield Road and Belper Road; the first report of its existence appeared in 1967. Excavations in 1995 revealed terracing, stone wall footing and a cobbled pavement. Finds of pottery from the excavations are partly held by the Trent & Peak Archaeological Trust, partly at Derby Museum.

Its purpose was probably to protect an important river crossing: less than a mile to the south the north-south Roman road now known as Ryknild Street crossed the Derwent. A second road, known as The Long Lane, ran westward from this point in the direction of Wroxeter and Chester; a third, known as The Street, crossed the Peak District towards Buxton and Manchester.

== History ==
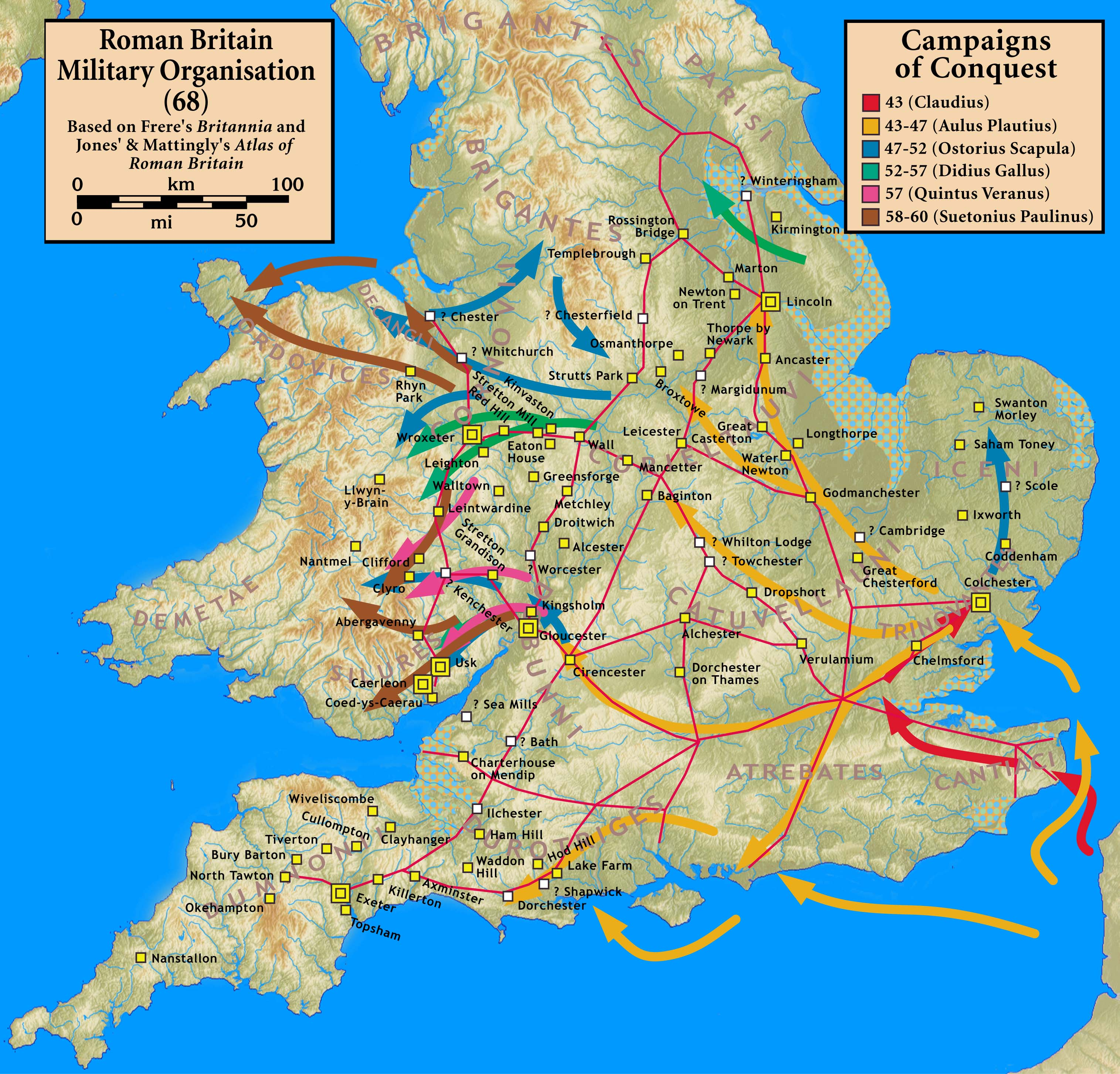
The campaigns of Ostorius Scapula

The general outline of the Roman conquest of Britain during the 1st century AD is recorded by historical sources; for the involvement of specific forts historians depend on archaeological excavations. This part of Britain was occupied by a tribe known as the Cornovii. In AD 46–47 the Roman Army led by governor Aulus Plautius had probably occupied the lands to the south of the River Trent. Late in 47 the new governor of Britain, Ostorius Scapula, began a campaign against the tribes of the western mountains (modern Wales). Caratacus, their leader, was defeated in battle in AD 50 and fled to the Brigantes who occupied the Pennines. Their queen, Cartimandua, came to terms with the Romans and handed Caratacus over to them. Ostorius died and was replaced by Aulus Gallus who brought the Welsh borders under control but did not move further north or west. It was at about this time that the fort at Strutt's Park was built. It probably lay not far south of the border between Roman territory and that held by the Brigantes, who were now an allied or subject kingdom.

The campaign to conquer the Welsh mountains continued under governor Quintus Veranius and his successor Gaius Suetonius Paulinus. Around AD 74 Queen Cartimandua asked for Roman assistance to defeat a rebellion, indicating possible unrest in the territories north of Strutt's Park. Then in 78, Gnaeus Julius Agricola, made famous through the highly laudatory biography of him written by his son-in-law, Tacitus, was made governor. He consolidated the forts, improved the road infrastructure and led some now well documented campaigns – firstly in 78 he reconquered North Wales, then in 79 conquered the Brigantes and also the Parisii of modern east Yorkshire, thus completing the annexation of what is now northern England. Strutt's Park, if intended as a defence of the river crossing against the Brigantes to the north, was perhaps no longer needed. It was at any rate replaced, at about this time, by a new fort at Little Chester, directly on the line of Ryknild Street and better placed to control the developing road network.

== Bibliography ==
- Barry C. Burnham, John Wacher (1990). The Small Towns of Roman Britain. London: Batsford. ISBN 978-0-520-07303-6.
- J. Dool (1986). "Roman Derby - Excavations 1968-1983". Derbyshire Archaeological Journal. 105, 1985. - "Excavations at Strutts Park, Derby, 1974"
- A. L. F. Rivet, Colin Smith (1979). The Place-Names of Roman Britain. London: Batsford. p. 334. ISBN 978-0-691-03953-4.
- H. Wheeler (1986). "Roman Derby - Excavations 1968-1983". Derbyshire Archaeological Journal. 105, 1985. - "Conclusion: The development of Roman Derby"
