= Icknield Street =

Roman road in England

- Ryknild Street
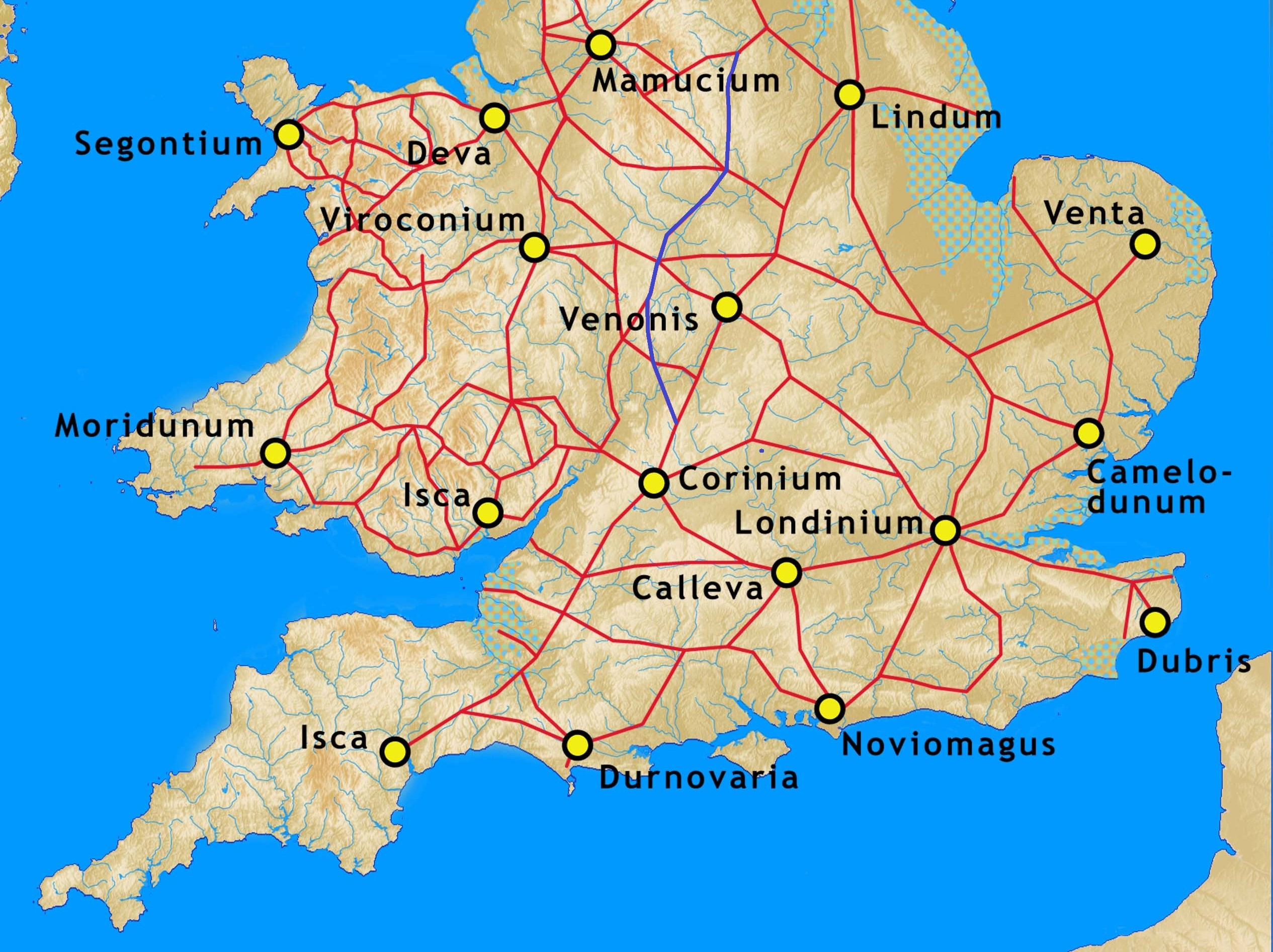
- Roman Icknield Street, indicated by the indigo line.

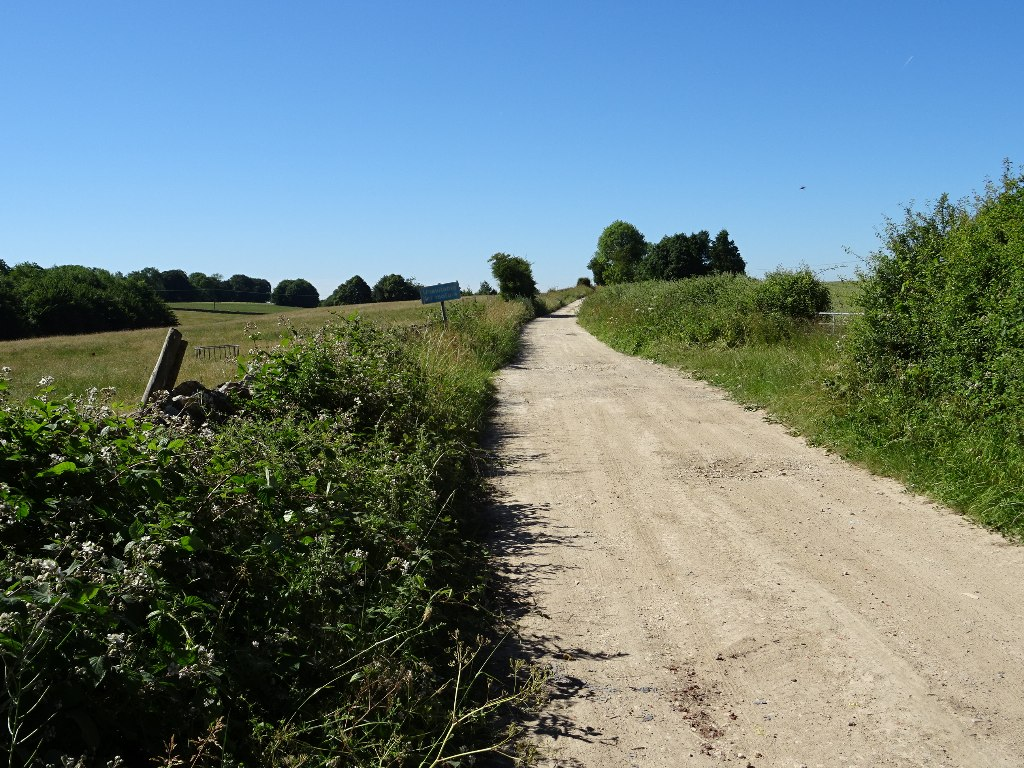
- Icknield Street close to its southern terminus - near Lower Swell, Gloucestershire.

Route information
- Length: 112 mi (180 km)
- Time period: Roman Britain to present
- Related routes: Fosse Way
- Margary number: 18

Major junctions
- Northern end: Templeborough, South Yorkshire
- Chesterfield, Derventio Coritanorum, Letocetum, Alcester
- Southern end: Bourton on the Water, Gloucestershire

Location
- Country: United Kingdom
- Constituent country: England

Road network
- Roman roads in Britannia

Icknield Street or Ryknild Street is a Roman road in England, with a route roughly south-west to north-east. It runs from the Fosse Way at Bourton-on-the-Water in Gloucestershire (51.888°N 1.767°W) to Templeborough in South Yorkshire (53.418°N 1.394°W). It passes through Alcester, Studley, Redditch, Metchley Fort, Birmingham, Sutton Coldfield, Lichfield, Burton upon Trent and Derby.

== Names ==
Four Roman roads having the King's protection are named in the Laws of Edward the Confessor: Watling Street, Ermine Street, the Fosse Way, and Hikenild or Icknield Street. Hikenild Strete is generally supposed to be connected with the country of the Iceni. Various forms of the name (the earliest in Anglo-Saxon charters are Icenhilde Weg or Icenilde Weg) designate other roads from the borders of Norfolk through Cambridgeshire, Bucks, Berks, Hants and Wilts into Dorset. These locations, however, would identify the route as Icknield Way an Iron Age trackway running from Norfolk to Dorset.

What is today referred to as the Icknield Street road acquired the name Ryknild Street during the 14th century, when it was named by Ranulf Higden, a monk of Chester writing in 1344 in his Polychronicon. Higdon gives the name as Rikenild Strete, which, he says, tends from the south-west to the north, and begins at St David's in Wales and continues across England to the mouth of the Tyne, passing Worcester, Droitwich, Birmingham, Lichfield, Derby, and Chesterfield. It has borne that name, or Rigning, Reenald or Rignall, from early times. In three of the four MSS of Higdon the name is given as Rikenilde or Rikenyldes, and in the fourth (which is said to be one of the earliest), Hikenil Street. Trevisa's English translation (1387) calls it Rykeneldes Strete. Harverfield, writing in the Victoria County History of Warwickshire doubted whether the road had any real and original right to either name, preferring Ryknild as no less correct (or no more incorrect), and being able to distinguish it from Icknield Street in Oxfordshire and Berkshire. It is now called Icknield or Ryknild Street to distinguish it from the older Icknield Way. In the 19th century it is also referred to in antiquarian literature with the spelling "Rykneld Street".

A preserved section of the Roman road can be seen at Sutton Park, now in the City of Birmingham.

== Route ==
George William Collen's book Britannia Saxonica (1833) concisely outlines the route, drawing on Leland's Itinerary:

... stated to have led from St. David's to Tynemouth. Its exact course [through Wales] is little known: it may, however, be traced from Gloucester to Norton; thence to a little east of Tewkesbury; thence to Ashchurch, Bekford, Aston-under-hill, to the west of Sedgebarrow in Worcestershire; thence to Hinton, a little east of Evesham, South Littleton, to Bitford in Warwickshire, through Wicksford to Alcester; thence near Coughton, Studley, and Ipsley; enters Worcestershire again near Beoley, passes near Egbaston in that county, and a little west of Birmingham crosses the [River] Tame at Woodford Bridge into Staffordshire; runs through Sutton Park and by Shenston, cuts the WAETLINGA-STRAETE (Watling Street) about a mile from Wall and Lichfield; thence to Streetley, crosses the [River] Trent at Whichnor; then taking Branston in its way, leaving Burton-upon Trent half-a-mile to the east, passes through Stretton, enters Derbyshire over Monk's Bridge near Egginton. The direction of this road cannot be traced further, although its course is said to have been through Derby, Chesterfield, York, and so to Tynemouth.

== Today's route ==
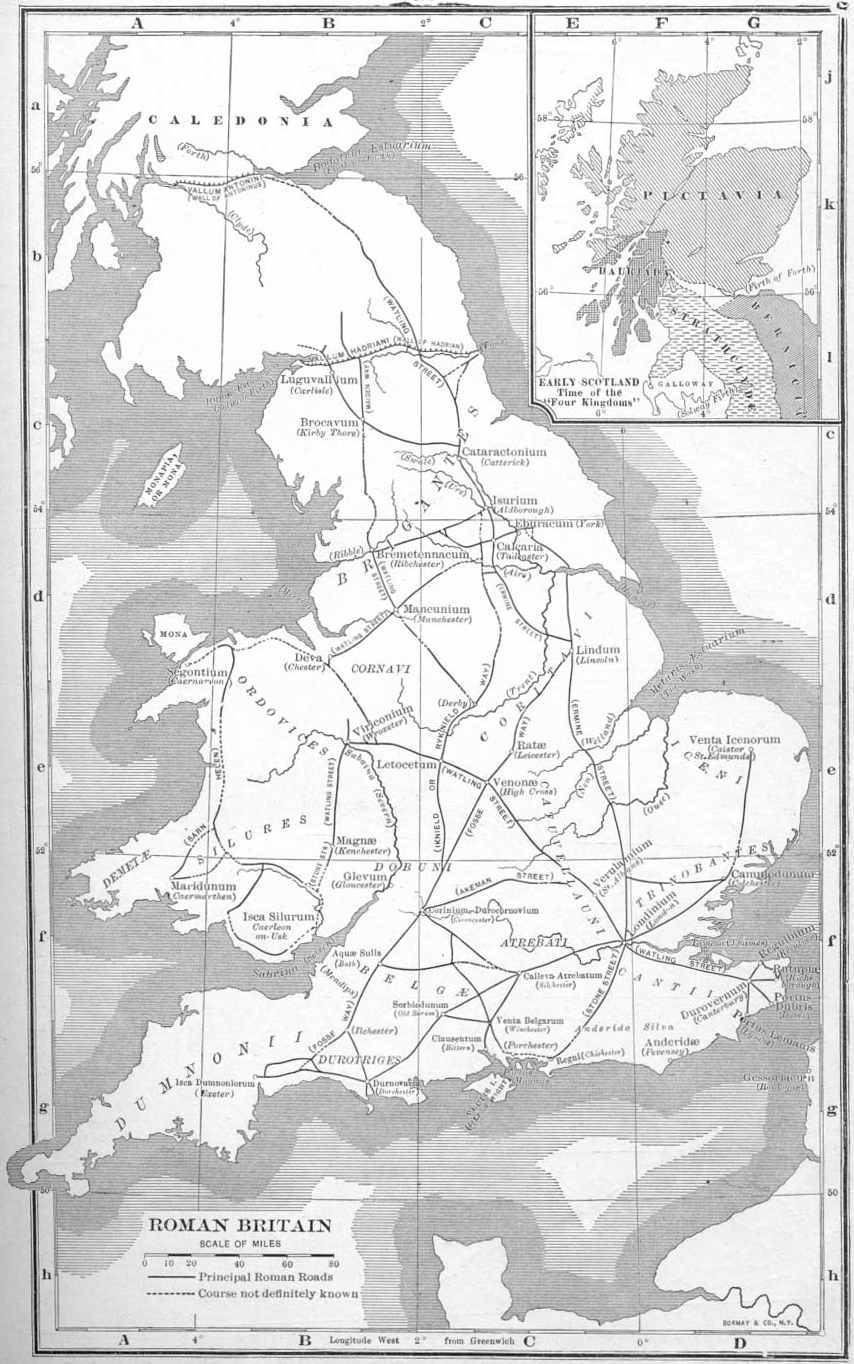

Much of the Midlands route of the Icknield Street is used by modern roads, most notably the A38 from Lichfield to Derby; and many sections retain the name "Icknield Street", but not always accurately as in Hockley, Birmingham and in Redditch, Worcestershire where there is also a road called Icknield Street Drive which stands near the course of the Roman road. Google Maps "Ryknild Street" is still in use in Lichfield and "Ryknild Road" in Derby.

=== Bourton-on-the-Water to Bidford-on-Avon ===
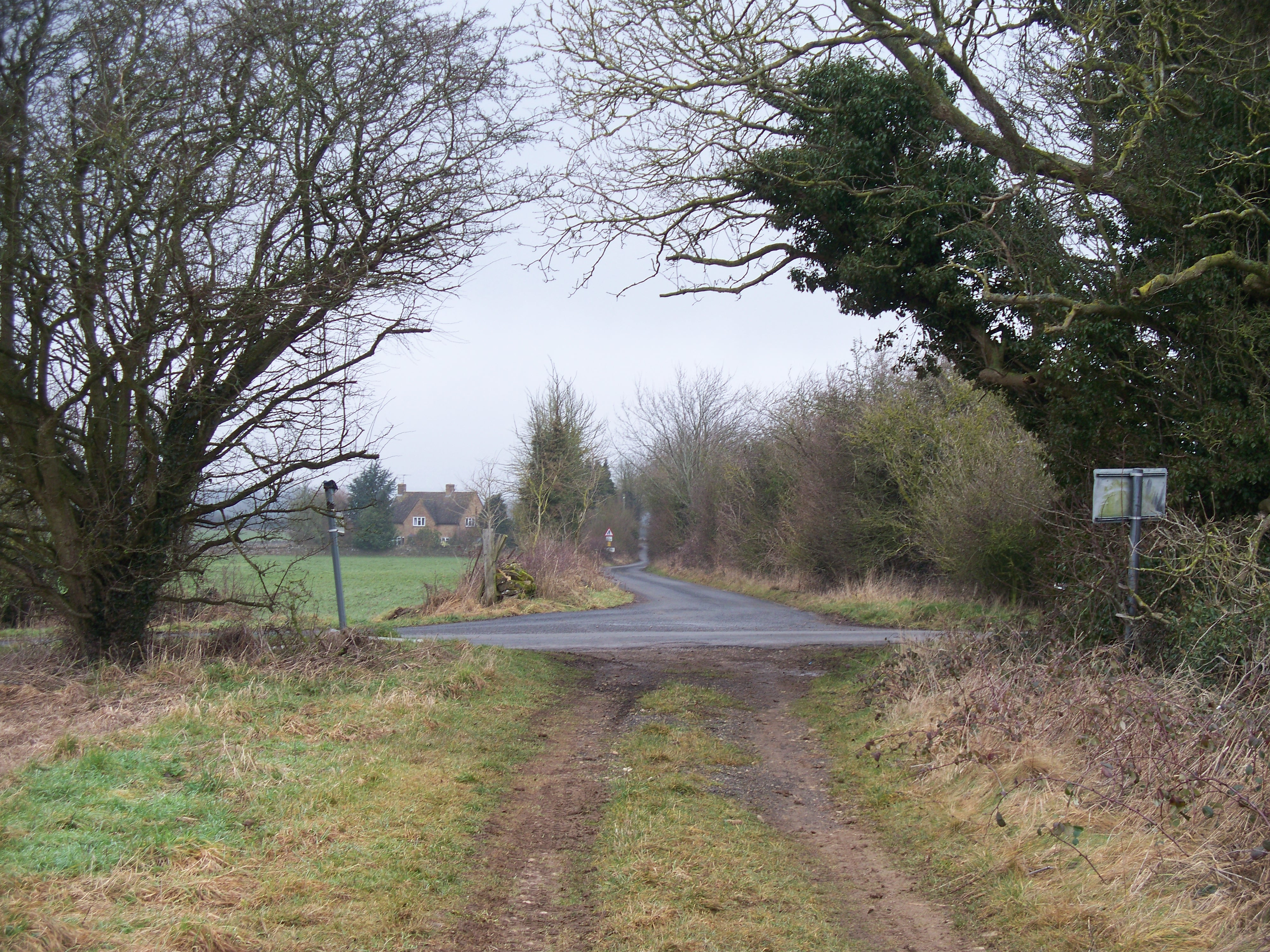
Condicote Lane, north of Bourton-on-the-Water.

The road appears to have joined the Fosse Way near Bourton-on‑the‑Water. Starting about two miles north of there, and two miles west of Stow-on-the-Wold, a lane (Condicott Lane) runs northwards in a straight line to Condicote and then Hinchwick. This lane appears to indicate the course of Icknield Street. It leads towards high ground, about 840 feet (260 m) on Bourton Down. It is not clear how the ascent of 250 feet (76 m) from Hinchwick to the Down was made, but on the Down a lane northwards from Springhill takes nearly the same line for 1.5 miles (2.4 km) to near the Evesham road 950 feet (290 m), from which a parish boundary over Saintbury Hill seems to mark the course down the north side. On the west side of Weston Park, a line seems to be taken up lying between high ground 940 feet (290 m), 2 miles (3.2 km) to the south, and Alcester, 12 miles (19 km) to the north. A road in this line, passing on the west of Weston-sub‑Edge, leads on to a highway with a parish boundary along it called Riknild or Icknield Street, which is crossed by the railway at Honeybourne Station. It continues northward under the name of Buckle Street to Staple Hill, one mile south of Bidford-on-Avon. This is probably the oldest version of the name being the modern form of a name Bucgan or Buggilde Street which appears in documents earlier than the Norman Conquest. As the road approaches Bidford there is a slight turn, and the modern road heads for the crossing point of the medieval bridge whereas the Roman ford is upstream of here and the road name preserved in a small road named Icknield Street on the northern bank. Evidence of a Roman causeway here confirms this as the Roman crossing point.

=== Bidford-on-Avon to Birmingham ===
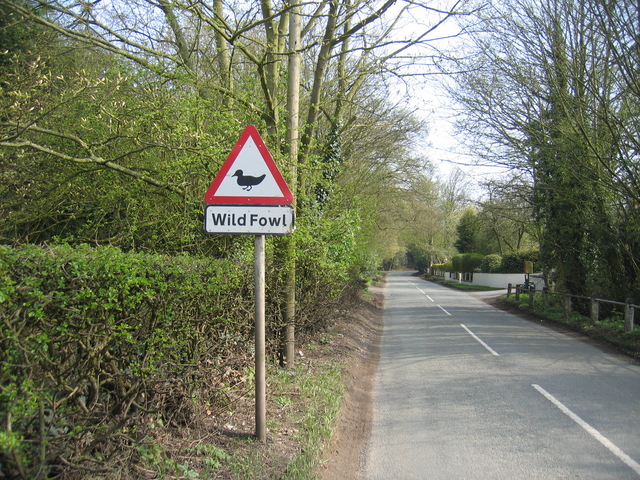
Near Beoley in Worcestershire

From Bidford following the named Icknield Street the line of the road then follows Waterloo Road through Bidford and then across country as the B4085. At Wixford by the Three Horse Shoes Inn the modern road turns west whilst the line of the road continues north in a hollow way to Saint Milburga's church where it becomes a track running along the ridge to the east of Ragley Hall heading towards Alcester. At Alcester the original crossing point has been lost due to changes in the course of the river and the development of the town but the line is recovered north of the town on the modern A435. Passing Coughton Court the road bears the local name of Headon or Haydon Way and proceeds through Studley and to one mile beyond, where the modern road turns off to the north-eastward. Heading north much of the route is lost, since Codrington wrote, in the development of Redditch, however Icknield Street Drive, Battens Drive approximates the route until a small road through the residential area of Churchill marked Ryknield Street on the modern 1:25,000 Ordnance Survey map, exactly in a line with Haydon Way, is reached. This line appears to point from Alcester to high ground about 480 feet (150 m), one mile east of Rowney Green, and 1.5 miles (2.4 km) north of Beoley. Now the B4497 the road heads north through Beoley crossing under the M42 motorway just south of Alcott Farm. It retains the name Icknield Street, climbing the high ground of Swans Hill between the Coach and Horses Public House at Weatheroak Hill and the Peacock Inn at the junction with Lea End Lane. Here, a hedge line and footpath run directly up the hill while the modern road deviates slightly to the east to accommodate the incline before rejoining the original route and continuing north until it enters the suburbs of Birmingham at Kings Norton adjacent to the Romano British settlement of Longdales Road. It then follows the course of Walkers Heath Road over the traffic roundabout at Parsons Hill, to Broadmeadow Lane, Lifford Lane, Pershore Road and Hazelwell Street, finally disappearing into residential developments at Stirchley by the swimming baths.

=== Across Birmingham ===
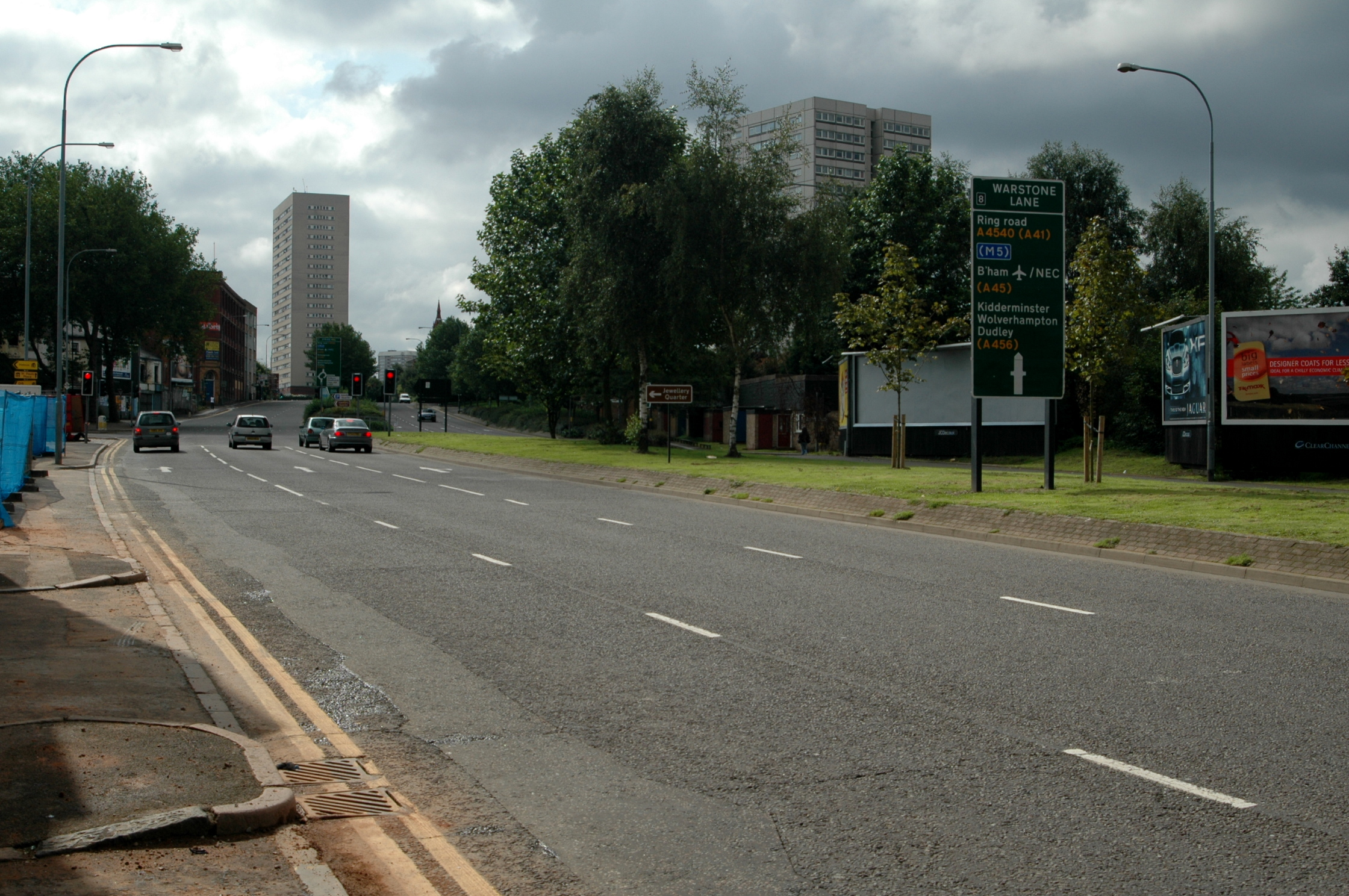
Birmingham's Middle Ring Road.

The 7 miles from Stirchley in the south of Birmingham to Perry Bridge at Holford in the north is a serious problem. It has long vexed Birmingham antiquaries and is perhaps insoluble. Hutton gave the course as "onwards by Stirchley Street, crossing the Bromsgrove road at Selly Oak, leaving Harborne a mile to the west, by the observatory in Lady Wood Lane, crossing the Dudley Road at Sandpits, and along Worstone Lane, passing five furlongs north of the Navigation Bridge in Great Charles Street, Birmingham. He saw the section of the road where the inhabitants attempted to pull it up for the sake of the materials, 20 yards wide, and one yard deep, filled up with stone cemented with coarse mortar," and he says that "the course was discoverable by its barren track through uncultivated meadows." Icknield Street or Icknield Port Road are not old names and cannot be traced in the city prior to 1825 and may have been introduced as a result of Hutton's theory. Birmingham and its suburbs now cover the old road. The line of Hazelwell Street sets the course of the road towards the next established point of the route at Metchley Fort in the grounds of the Queen Elizabeth Hospital. The fort was established about 48 AD by the Roman army as a base camp for its conquest of the Birmingham area and part of a network of forts across the Midlands linked by roads. It stood by Birmingham's earliest known road junction at the point where Icknield Street was met by Roman roads coming in from Droitwich and Penkridge. From here the road runs north to another fort at Wall, Roman Etocetum near Lichfield. The Perry Bridge of 1711 stands at its crossing of the River Tame in Perry Barr. However, Walker cast doubts on this orthodox view of the road's course in this area and resistivity surveys undertaken on sites either side of the crossing in 1992, showed that, although the line of the road is clearly indicated on old maps and aerial photographs, the site has been considerably altered this century by, among other things, the embankment of the M6. The one place where the road might have been detected proved inaccessible without considerable clearance of dense undergrowth (remnants of a hedge-line following the road?) and a 20-metre grid on adjacent open ground proved negative. The second site was on wasteland immediately south of the river. Here, the "Walker" road-line only shaved the top comer of this before disappearing under a modern industrial development (plot-holders in allotments to the south did not recall any finds during building work, nor were they able to identify any "hard" areas on their land, where the "Walker" line might be expected to continue). A series of complete and partial 20-metre grids laid down the fence line between the industrial estate and the wasteland and then right across the open area yielded nothing which could relate to the "Walker" line but did produce some low resistance features running parallel with the site's east boundary.

=== Birmingham to Lichfield ===
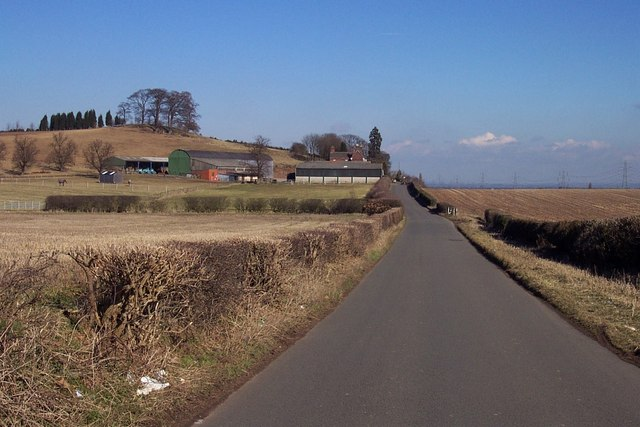
Knowle Lane near Knowle Farm.

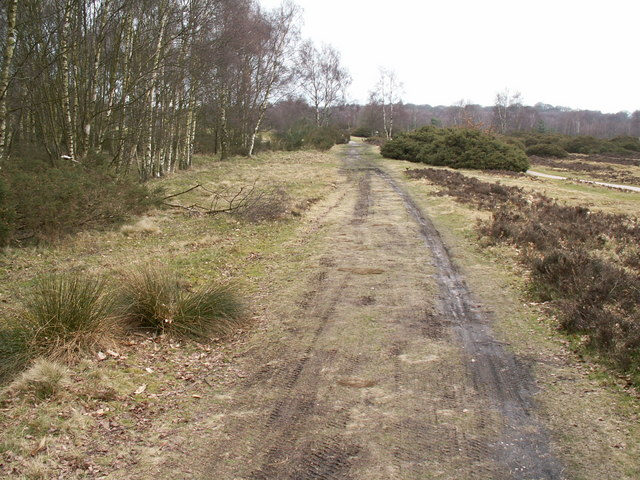
Icknield Street: a section preserved in Sutton Park

From Perry Bridge the road heads North, Coddrington describes the route as following a county boundary for a quarter of a mile and then a road, now the B4138, Kingstanding Road, until it enters Sutton Park close to the old Royal Oak Inn, now the Toby Carvery and Lodge. The course is preserved as it crosses the Western edge of the park, where the ridge appears very plainly, of a rounded profile, eight or nine yards wide over all, and three to four feet high in the middle. It has been described as presenting one of the best examples of a Roman road, 60 feet (18 m) wide with a ditch on each side. It has little claim to be so considered, and the ditches where they occur appear to be connected with modern drainage. To the north of the park, about half-a‑mile through the private residential estate Little Aston Park where it is named Roman Road, a short length of road north of Little Aston, Forge Lane, and another length to the west of Shenstone, mark the course of the road in a straight line from Streetley Hill to high ground 450 feet (140 m), on the north-east of Wall. From near Birmingham to Wall (Letocetum) for nine miles the road is not perceptibly out of a straight line, which may very well have been set out from intermediate points at Streetley Hill, and the high ground 500 feet (150 m), south of the old Royal Oak Inn. Icknield Street would appear to have crossed Watling Street on the east of Letocetum at the point where Ashcroft Lane crosses the A5. There is then a considerable change of direction to the north-east, and a straight course for nine miles to near Barton-under-Needwood. The alignment was sighted from Knowle Farm, as there is a slight bend at this point. Knowle Lane then follows the course of the old road leading into Cricket Lane, Quarry Hills Lane and on to a preservation of the name as Ryknild Street. This in turn leads to Austin Cote Lane, which crosses the Brittania Enterprise Park onto the Old Burton Road, joining the A38 at Streethay.

=== Lichfield to Derby ===
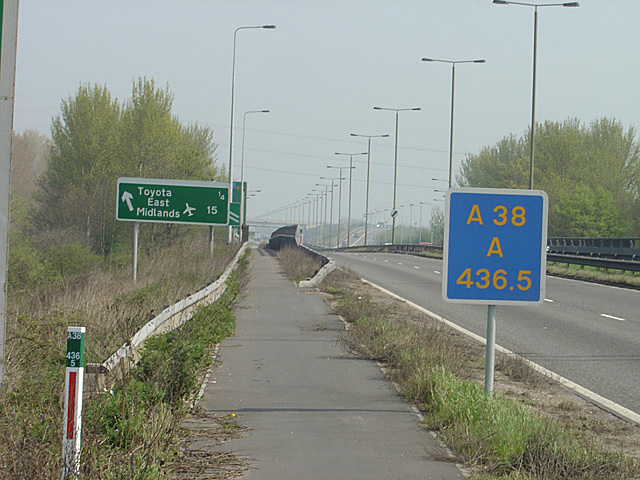
A38 between Burton and Derby.

The old road is still used, save a few local diversions, from the crossing with the main Birmingham-Lichfield road (A 38(T)), to Littleover on the outskirts of Derby and here the highway is very straight and well raised, by two to three feet in places, a fine example of a Roman road still in use. William Stukeley wrote that "part of Rigning Way north from Wall was very fair with a high straight bank" and that "upon the hill south of Littleover, Rigning is under the eye as far as Etocetum, and the hills beyond it." At Littleover the road turns to the east as the modern A5250, but named Rykneld Street and later Pastures Hill where a section of road has been examined adjacent to Derby High School and Pineview Gardens, 2 miles (4 km) south west of Derventio, the Roman fort at Little Chester. The buried remains of the Roman road are not visible above ground but include drainage features and construction pits flanked by shallow boundary ditches. Plough scars cutting the Roman road surface indicate that in the post-Roman period the site was used for arable land whilst in the 18th century, it formed part of the Birmingham to Derby turnpike but it is also possible that by this time, the main road had been diverted onto its present course at Pastures Hill. Archaeological excavation in 2003 by the Birmingham University Field Archaeology Unit identified the presence of a Bronze Age cremation cemetery in the area between the road and Pastures Hill. A Bronze Age cremation urn was recovered as well as evidence for Iron Age occupation indicating the area may have served as a long lived ritual landscape, including Bronze Age to Roman activity in the Roman road's alignment. It has been suggested that the Bronze Age cremations could have been laid out along the line of a Bronze Age trackway which continued to use into, or was returned to use, during the Roman period.

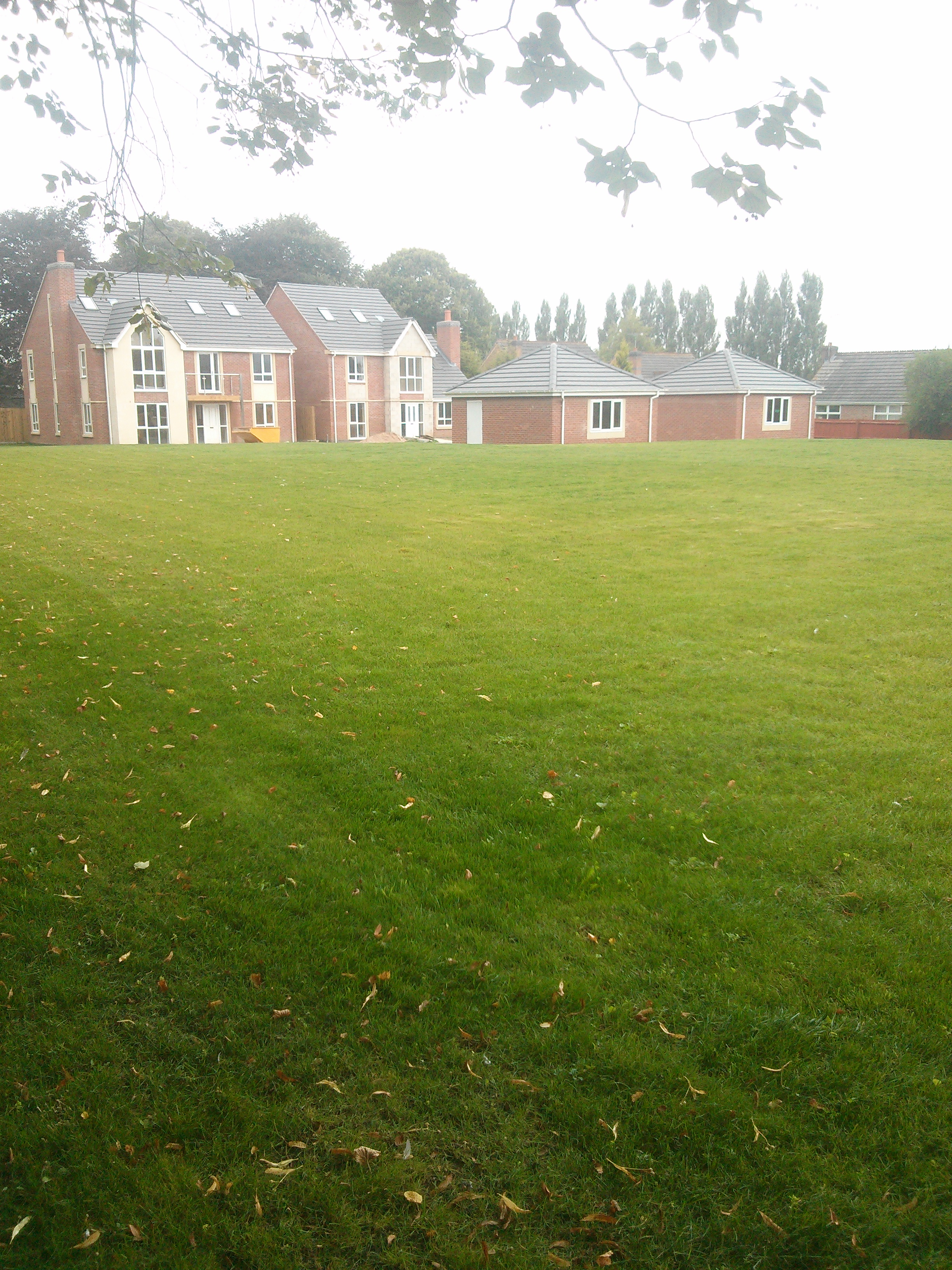
The section of Rykneld Street and the remains of Bronze Age cemetery at Littleover are lawned over and are an island in a development of new houses.

The course appears to have been on the west side of Derby passing close to a Roman fort, occupied in 50 AD, at Strutts Park (some finds of pottery from the excavations of the fort are in the collection of Derby Museum). Swan doubts that Ryknild Street went to Strutts Park, which was replaced around 80 AD by the fort at Chester Green on the other side of the River Derwent, the construction of Ryknild Street being contemporary with that of the later fort. Stukeley traced the track of the wall at Chester Green all round enclosing an area, according to his plan, 120 paces from east to west, and 100 paces from north to south, the foundation of the bridge he said could be felt with a staff. and Bishop Bennet in 1817 said that the piers of the bridge could be felt in a dry summer.

=== Derby to Chesterfield ===
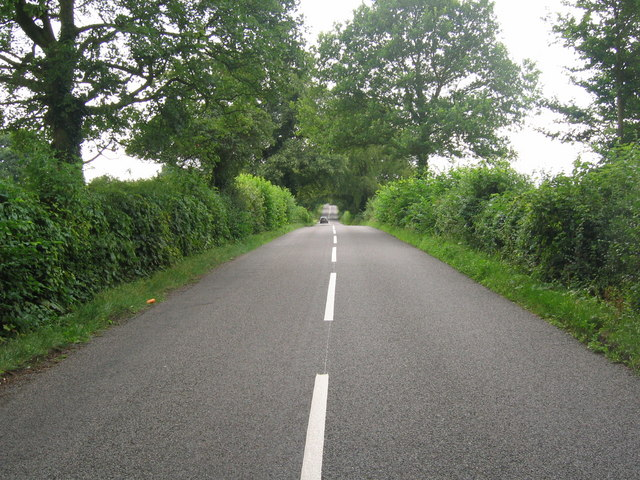
Moor Road near Breadsall.

From Little Chester to the countryside north of Derby, the route has not been determined. It is certain that a road left Derventio to the east which led to Sawley on the River Trent, Icknield Street branching from this to the North East. The course is well marked beyond Breadsall, one and a half miles from Little Chester, but the intervening length has not yet been ascertained, however, there is a Ryknield Hill in Denby, which may be part of the route.

== See also ==
- Roman Britain
- Roman roads in Britain
