= County Cricket Ground, Derby =

Cricket ground in Derbyshire, England

Coordinates: 52°55′39″N 1°27′40″W

The County Ground
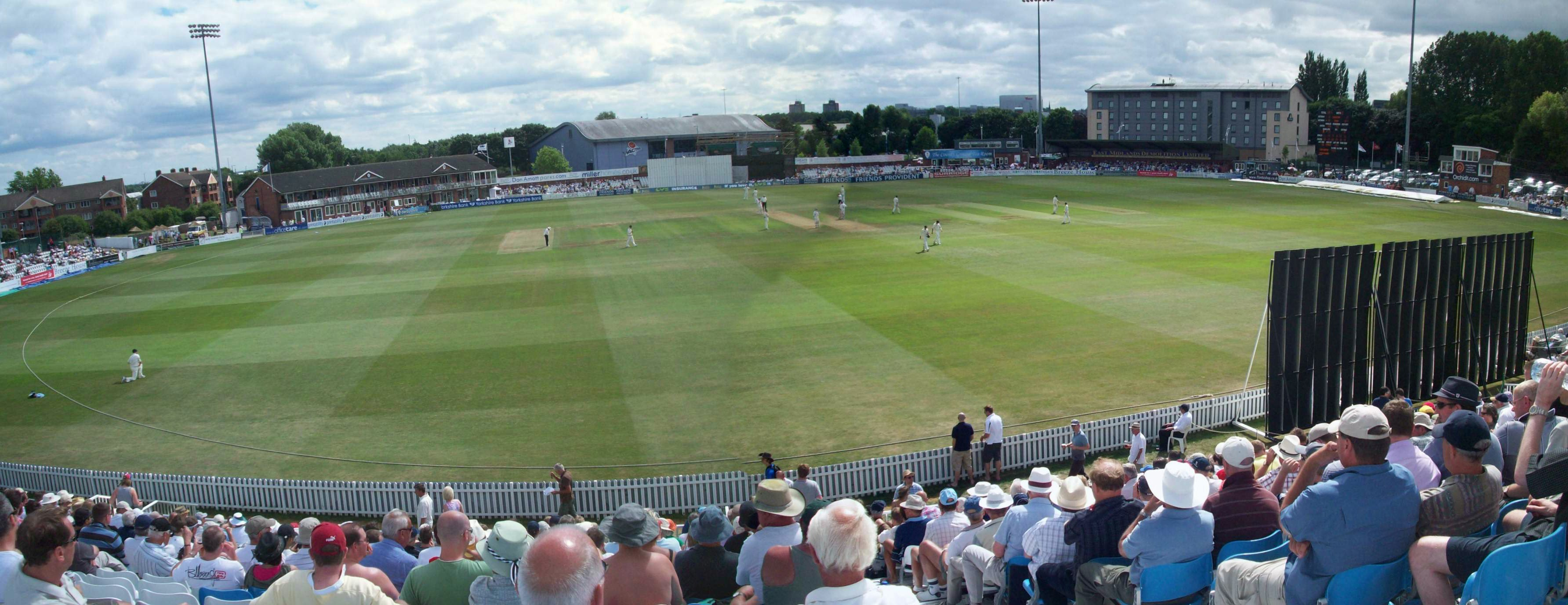
- Derbyshire v. Australia tour match, July 2010, taken from the position of the new media centre
- Interactive map of The County Ground

Ground information
- Location: Derby, Derbyshire
- Country: England
- County club: Derbyshire
- Establishment: 1863
- Capacity: 9,500
- End names
- Racecourse End Pavilion End

International information
- First men's ODI: 18 June 1983: New Zealand v Sri Lanka
- Last men's ODI: 28 May 1999: New Zealand v Pakistan
- First women's ODI: 15 July 1998: England v Australia
- Last women's ODI: 3 September 2026: England v Ireland
- First women's T20I: 5 August 2006: England v India
- Last women's T20I: 20 May 2026: England v New Zealand

Team information
Derbyshire	(1871–present)
Derbyshire Cricket Board	(2000)
Derbyshire Women	(2011–2013)
Loughborough Lightning	(2017)
- As of 23 May 2024; Source: CricketArchive

The County Cricket Ground (usually shortened to the County Ground, also known as the Racecourse Ground) is a cricket ground in Derby, England. It has been the home of Derbyshire County Cricket Club since 1871. The ground was first used by South Derbyshire Cricket Club in 1863 and was initially located within Derby Racecourse, although racing ceased after 1939. The ground has staged two One-Day Internationals: New Zealand against Sri Lanka during the 1983 ICC Cricket World Cup and New Zealand against Pakistan during the 1999 ICC Cricket World Cup. It was one of the venues for the 2017 ICC Women's Cricket World Cup, hosting one of the semi-finals.

The ground was also formerly used for football, and was the home of Derby County FC between 1884 and 1895. It staged the first ever FA Cup Final match played outside London, a replay of the 1886 Final, and hosted an international match between England and Ireland in 1895.

== History ==
The ground was first used by South Derbyshire Cricket Club in 1863 and was initially located within Derby Racecourse, although racing ceased after 1939.

It also held the games of Derby County Football Club until their move to the Baseball Ground in 1895. The first FA Cup Final outside London was held at the ground in 1886 when Blackburn Rovers beat West Bromwich Albion 2–0 in a replay. England played one football international here, beating Ireland 9–0 in the British Home Championship on 9 March 1895.

The playing area used to feature pitches laid on an east–west axis. Most first-class grounds feature pitches laid north–south to avoid problems with the light from the setting sun. Derbyshire re-laid the pitch on a north–south axis over the 2009/10 winter at a cost of £100,000, ready for the 2010 season. This involved moving some of the floodlights and the electronic scoreboard to suit the new alignment.

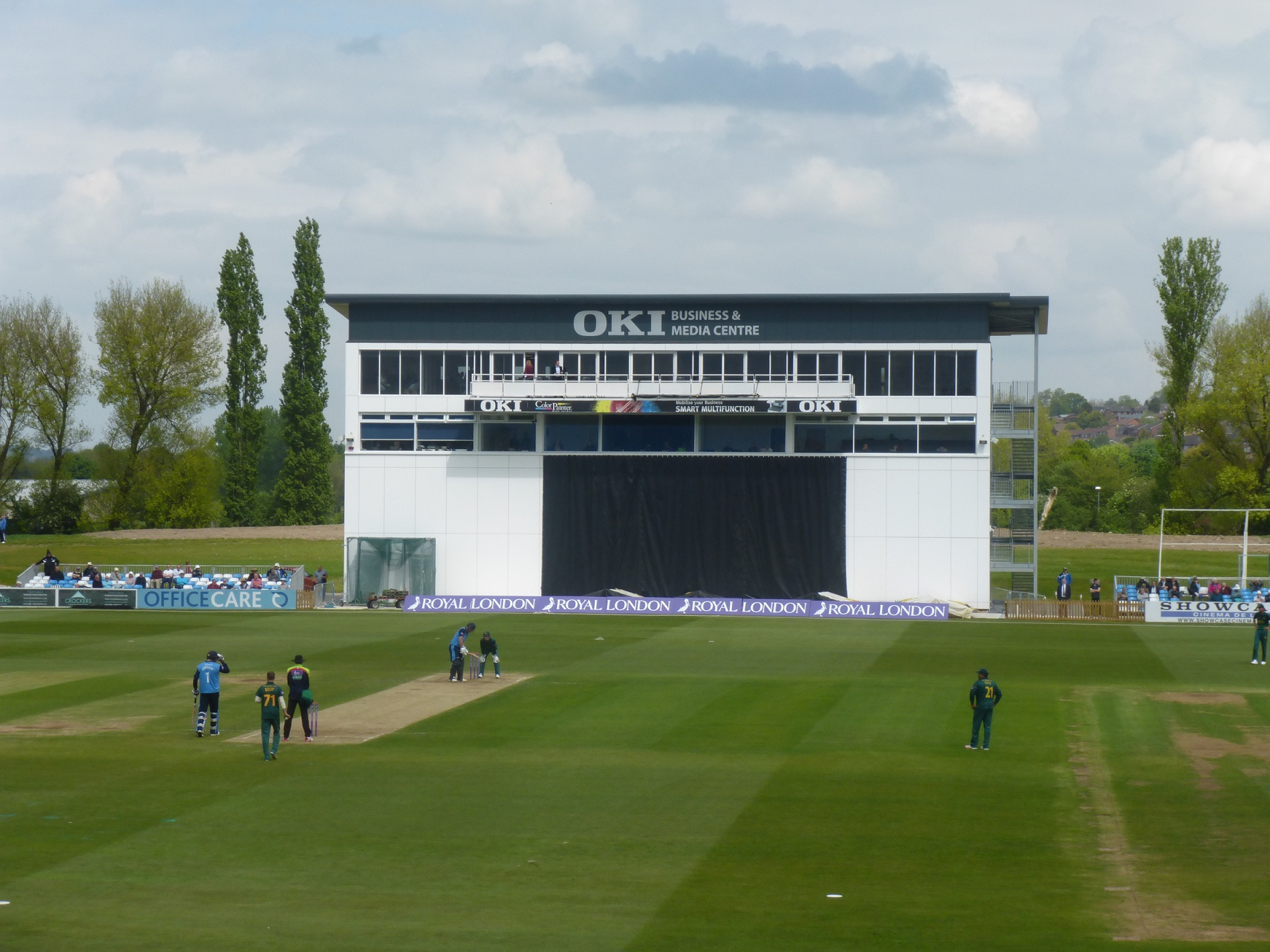
The new media centre - May 2017

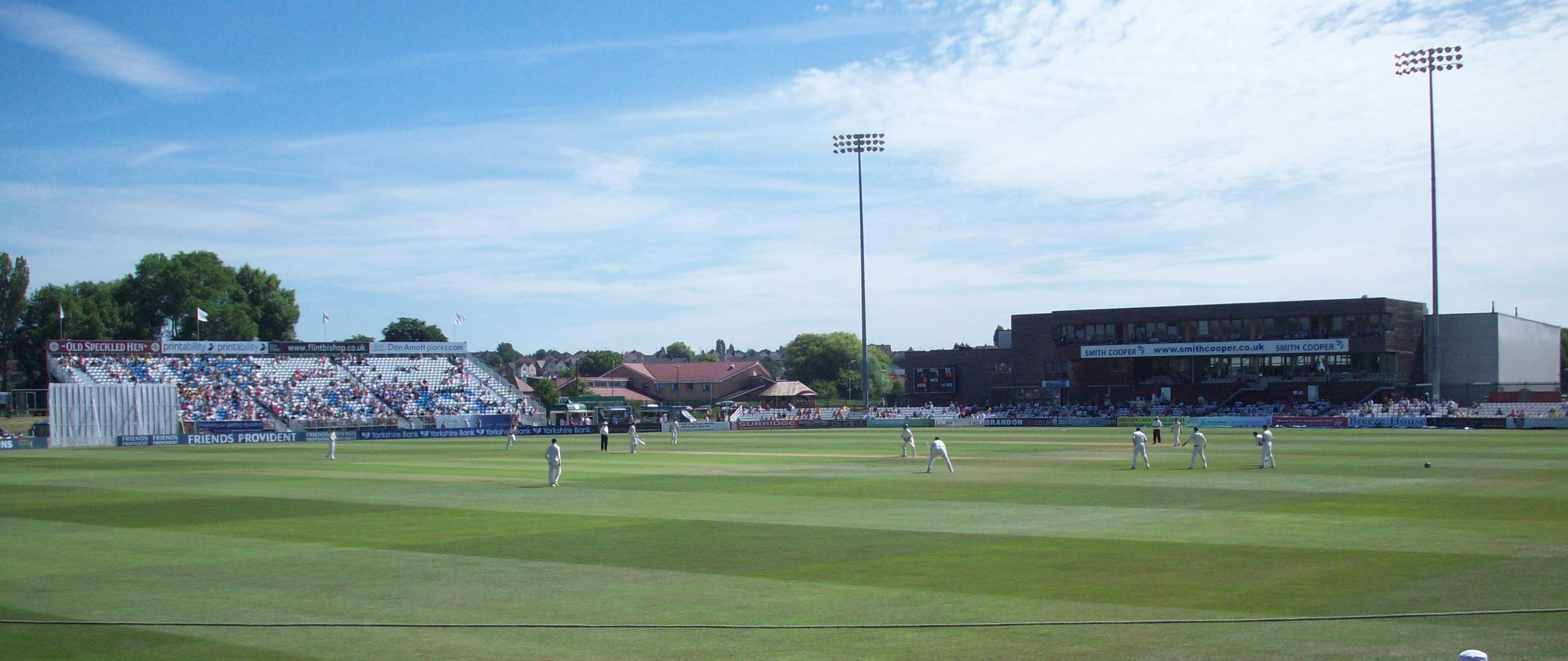
Derbyshire v. Australia tour match - July 2010

In early 2010 a large 1800 seat stand was erected at the Racecourse End of the ground. This stand was taken down in late 2015 in order to make way for a new £2.2 million four-storey media centre, which was completed and officially opened in September 2016. Some 1100 seats were immediately reinstated at the Pavilion End of the ground, with the remaining reinstated next to the new media centre. In February 2017 Derby Civic Society awarded a commendation in the category of Best New Build of 2016 to Derbyshire County Cricket Club for the new media centre.

A new marquee was also built in 2010, which is used for private functions and entertainment during match days.

In February 2016, it was announced that the County Ground would be one of the host venues for the 2017 Women's Cricket World Cup in England. Along with Bristol, Derby hosted one of the semi-finals of the tournament.

== Other events ==
Music concerts have been staged at the ground by Elton John and Boyzone, both in 2017, and Little Mix in 2018.

== See also ==
- List of cricket grounds in England and Wales
