= Perry Bridge =

Historic bridge in Birmingham, England

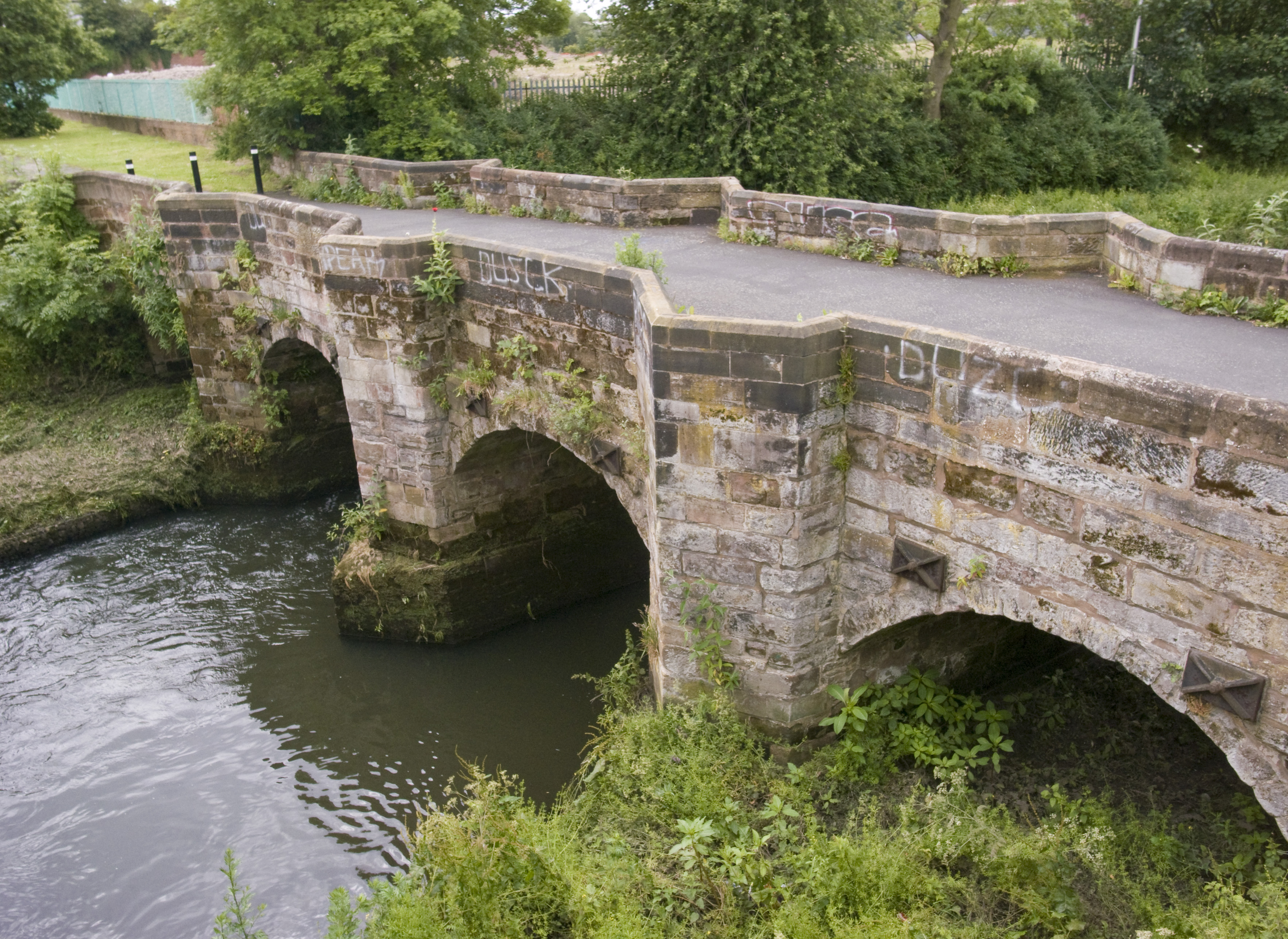
- Coordinates: 52.52534°N 1.89711°W
- Carries: Now only pedestrian
- Crosses: River Tame
- Locale: Perry Barr, Birmingham, England
- Maintained by: Birmingham City Council

Characteristics
- Total length: 50 metres (164 ft)
- Width: 4 metres (13 ft)

History
- Construction end: 1711

Location
- Interactive map of Perry Bridge

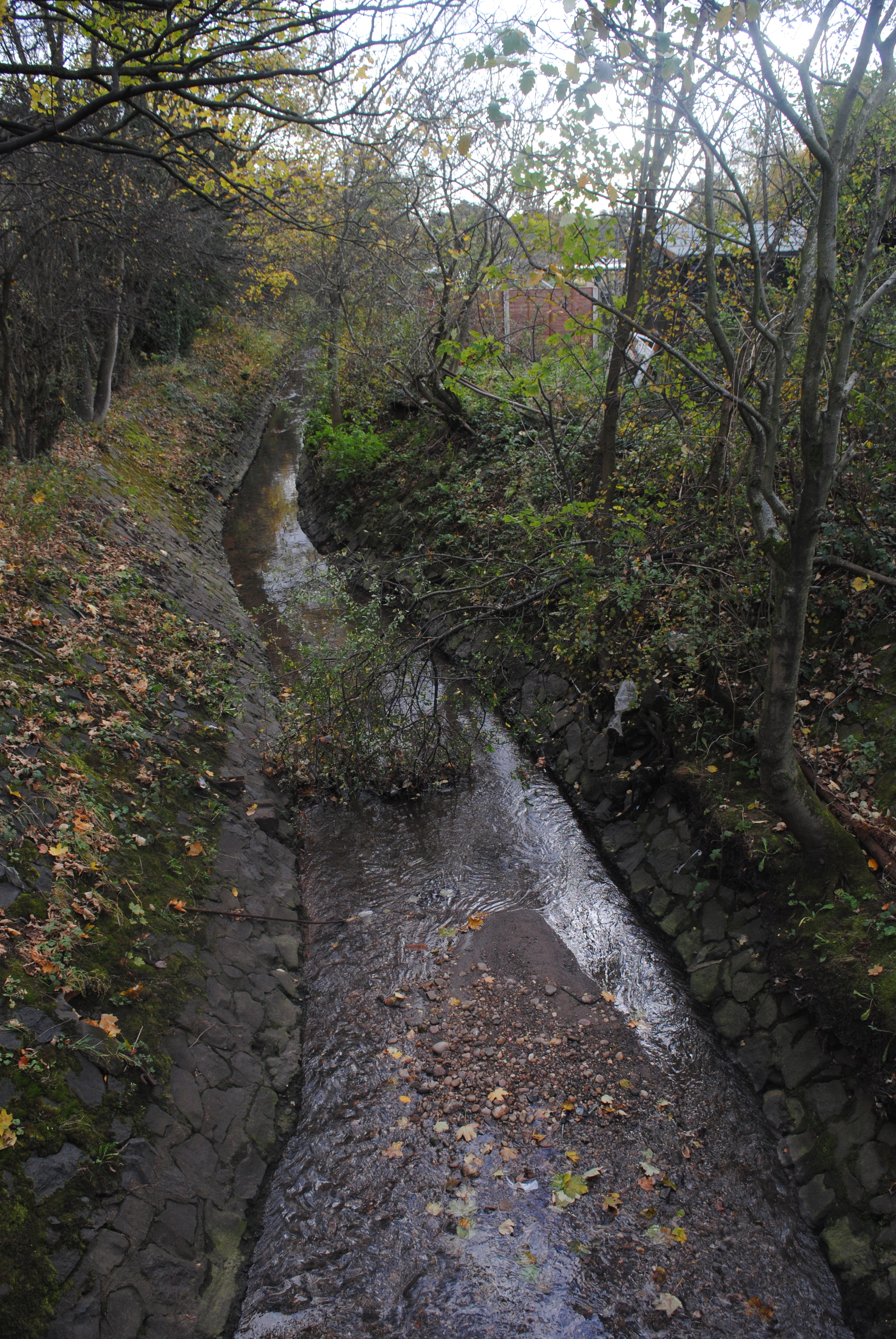
Holbrook flows near Perry Bridge (pictured here at Great Barr)

Perry Bridge, also known as the Zig Zag Bridge, is a bridge over the River Tame in Perry Barr, Birmingham, England. Built in 1711, it is a Grade II listed building and a scheduled monument. The bridge is constructed of red sandstone in a packhorse style.

The river crossing may well have been in use from prehistoric times. It is believed that it is the bridge built by order of the Staffordshire Quarter Sessions, held in 1709, to take the place of a 'wood horse bridge' (Perry Barr was in Staffordshire until 1928). It is said to have been built by Sir Henry Gough of nearby Perry Hall. A crossing has been on the spot since Roman times as this was the exact spot where Ryknild Street (today's Aldridge Road) crossed the river, giving rise to the local placename, "Holford". A stream, "Holbrook", joins the river adjacent to the bridge.

Written evidence of this crossing date back to as early as 1509 when there was mention of a field, named "Bridge Meadow", being located nearby.

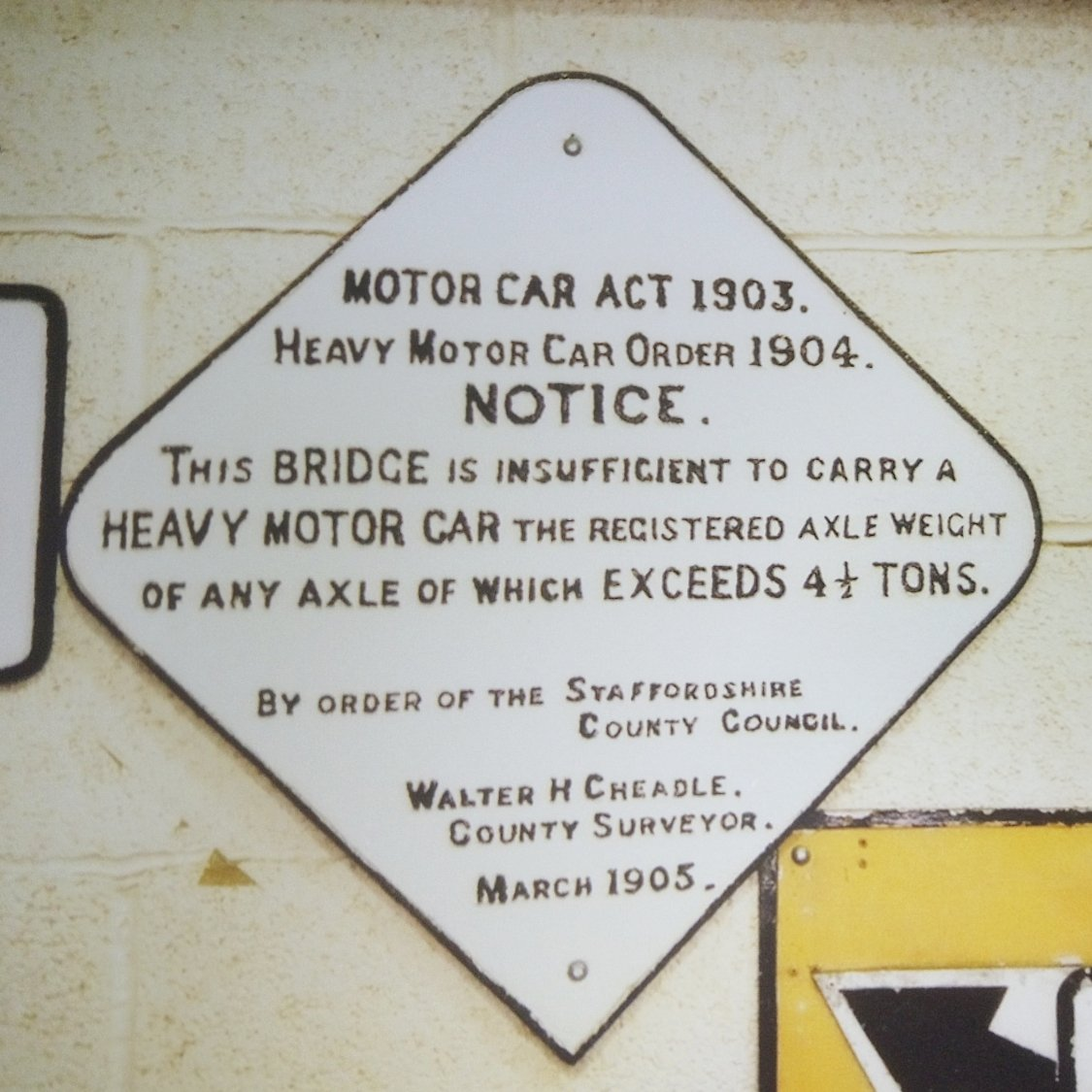
Sign that was erected near the bridge circa 1905 and removed when the new bridge opened in 1932

The bridge is 50 feet (15 m) in length and 13 feet (4 m) wide. The parapets on each side rise nearly 3 feet (1 m). It is now open only to pedestrian traffic.

A replacement bridge, in Art Deco style, built in 1932, stands alongside, and carries vehicular traffic on the route.

== Bridge Trust ==
The Bridge Trust was set up in 1612 when John Hogetts, owner “The Grove” in Grove Lane, Handsworh made an endowment of 50 acres of land in order to maintain and repair the bridges in the parish. At the time there were three footbridges and five carriage bridges, all wooden. Any surplus was to be applied for charitable purposes within the parish of Handsworth.

In 1802, responsibility for the bridge repair passed to the County of Stafford allowing the Trust to build a substantial surplus much of which was applied to the foundation of schools in Handsworth.

Schools founded by trustees of the Handsworth Bridge Trust included the Handsworth National School in 1812–13, built for £800. The Bridge Trust School was set up by the Trust in 1862, subsequently becoming Handsworth Grammar School and then King Edward VI Handsworth Grammar School for Boys. The school badge depicts the Staffordshire knot over the Perry Bridge.
