= The Long Lane (Derbyshire) =

Roman road in Derbyshire, England

The Long Lane is the medieval and modern name of the Roman road that ran almost due westwards from Derventio, the Roman fort and vicus in the suburbs of modern Derby, through Derbyshire to Rocester (where there was a Roman settlement) and Draycott in the Moors. From that point onwards the same road – no longer called "The Long Lane" – continued through Staffordshire to Chesterton near Newcastle-under-Lyme. Its destination was Middlewich (Latin Salinae), from which the important city of Chester (Latin Deva) was in easy reach.

== Bibliography ==
- "Roman Antiquities" in Daniel Lysons, Samuel Lysons, Derbyshire: a general and parochial history of the county (Magna Britannia. 1817) pp. 203–218
- M. Brassington, "The Roman roads of Derby" in Derbyshire Archaeological Journal vol. 101 (1981) pp. 88–92doi:10.5284/1066436
- Ivan Donald Margary, Roman Roads in Britain. 3rd ed. London: John Baker, 1973. ISBN 0-212-97001-1
