= Derventio Coritanorum =

Town in Roman Britannia, near Derby

Derventio
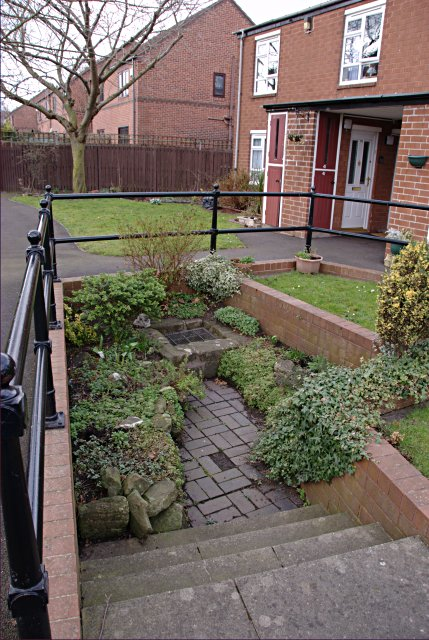
- This Roman well dates back to the late 3rd century, Derventio lies behind the houses

- Map showing the location of Derventio within Derbyshire.
- 52.933735°N 1.473586°W
- Type: Roman fort
- Location: Derby, Derbyshire
- Region: East Midlands
- Part of: Icknield Street

History
- Built: about AD 80
- Abandoned: about AD 120 (but settlement continued)

Site notes
- Website: Derventio (Coritanorum) at Roman Britain

Derventio was a small town in the Roman province of Britannia. Today the area is known as Little Chester, on the outskirts of Derby, located in the English county of Derbyshire.

== Description ==
The first castra in the area was built on the opposite bank of the River Derwent at Strutts Park. It was replaced about AD 80 by a fort on the present site, but this only lasted about forty years, then was decommissioned. There was extensive Roman activity prompted by the fort, which was connected westward by a road to the Icknield Street, and to the east by a road to Sawley on the River Trent. A fort-vicus which manufactured pottery and worked iron was founded 600m to the east on the Sawley Road. The fort was later re-occupied and re-used for a further twenty five years. The defensive bank and timber palisade were now remodelled and stone gates built. Then it lay unoccupied until the late 3rd century when a stone wall was built around the town. It did not outlive the end of the 4th century.

The modern Old Chester Road bisects the site of the fort, and in the nineteenth century the south east corner was cut by a line of the Great Northern Railway.

== History ==
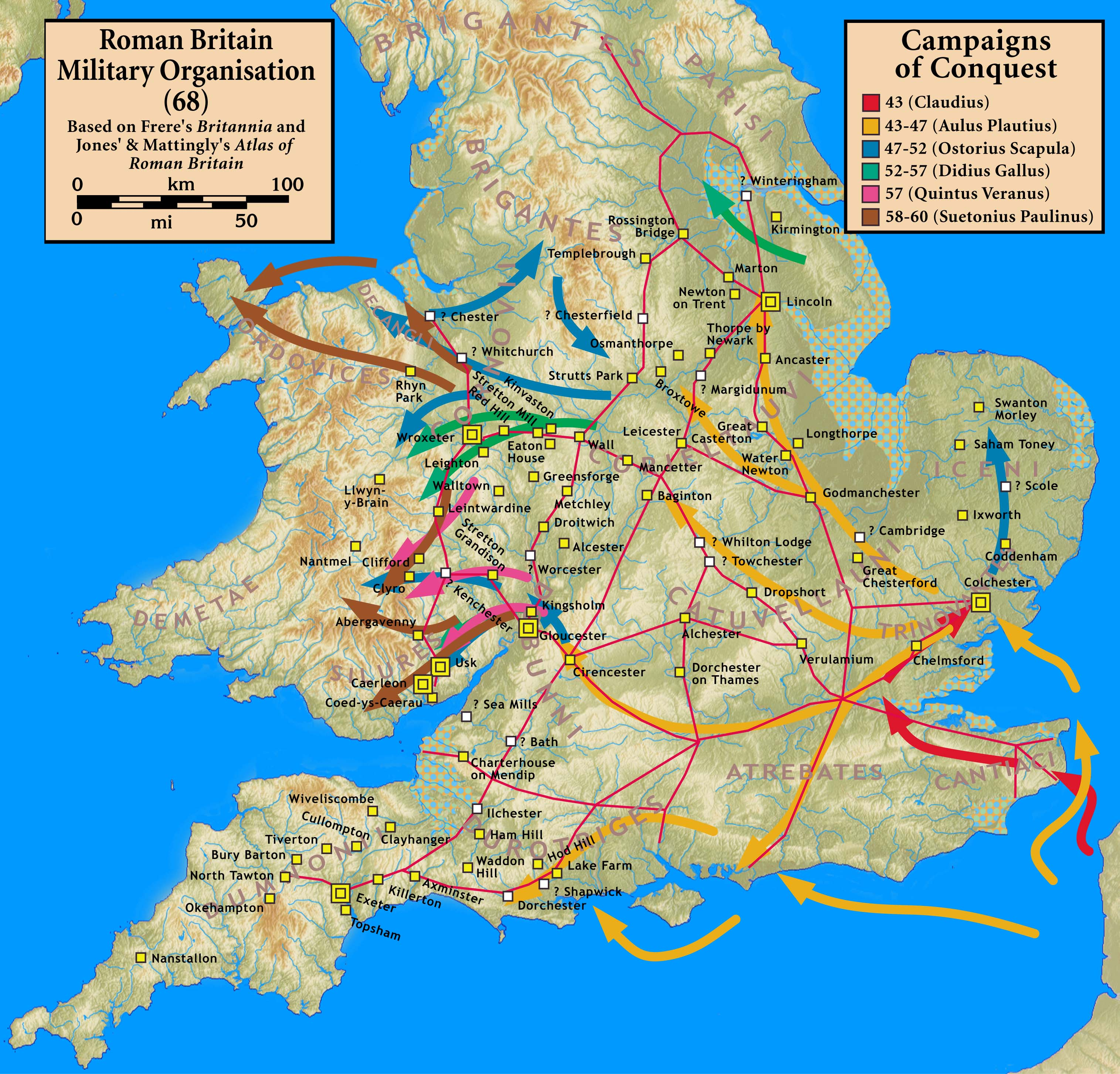
The campaigns of Ostorius Scapula

It is not known which tribal group occupied the area of Derby, though the Corieltauvi and Cornovii are the most likely. In AD 46-47 the Roman Army under the direction of governor Aulius Plautius had probably occupied the lands to the south of the River Trent, so in AD 50 this was the front line. There is a shortage of written documentation about these years so reliance is made on archaeological excavations. Late in 47 the new governor of Britain, Ostorius Scapula, began a campaign against the tribes of modern-day Wales, and the Cheshire Gap. During these times Strutt's Park Roman fort was one of the new forts built along the new supply road from Wroxeter to Rossington.

The campaign to conquer the Silures continued under the governor Quintus Veranius and his successor Gaius Suetonius Paulinus but by now Strutt’s Park's rôle was to maintain the peace. Around AD 74, the lands north of the River Mersey became unstable, when Queen Cartimandua had to ask for Roman assistance to fight off a rebellion. Then in AD78, Gnaeus Julius Agricola, made famous through the highly laudatory biography of him written by his son-in-law, Tacitus, was made governor. He consolidated the forts, improved the road infrastructure and led some now well documented campaigns – firstly in AD78, he reconquered North Wales, then in AD79 he conquered the Brigantes and Parisii, taking all of Northern England up to the present Scottish border. Strutt's Park fort was vacated in AD 80 when Derventio was built.

Derventio was occupied for 40 years until around 120AD. To put this in context, the Emperor Hadrian visited Britannia in AD120 and ordered his Wall to be built. Though Britannia always had a large garrison, focus now changed to industrial production. Derby produced pottery and had access to the lead mining to the north in the Peak District; later it became a centre for metalworking. This continued for the next 200 years.

== Bibliography ==
- "Exploratory excavations at Little Chester, Derby" in Derbyshire Archaeological Journal vol. 102 (1982) pp. 74–83
- M. Brassington, "The Roman roads of Derby" in Derbyshire Archaeological Journal vol. 101 (1981) pp. 88–92
- M. Brassington, "Little Chester, Derby: The 1926 excavations" in Derbyshire Archaeological Journal vol. 113 (1993)
- Barry C. Burnham, John Wacher, The Small Towns of Roman Britain. London: Batsford, 1990
- J. D'Arcy, A City within a City. Little Chester, Derby AD 80 - AD 2000. Derby, 2005
- M. Dearne, "The military vici of the South Pennines: retrospect and prospect" in R. Hodges, K. Smith, eds, Recent Developments in the Archaeology of the Peak District (Sheffield: Sheffield University Press, 1991) pp. 69–84
- J. Dool, H. Wheeler and others, Roman Derby - Excavations 1968-1983. 1986. (Derbyshire Archaeological Journal vol. 105, 1985)
- R. Langley, C. Drage, "Roman Occupation at Little Chester, Derby: salvage excavation and recording by the Trent and Peak Archaeological Trust 1986-1990" in Derbyshire Archaeological Journal vol. 120 (2000)
- A. L. F. Rivet, Colin Smith, The Place-Names of Roman Britain (London: Batsford, 1979) p. 334
- C. B. Sherwin, "Roman Remains at Little Chester" in Derbyshire Archaeological Journal vols 46/47 (1924/1925)
- C. Sparey Green, "Excavations on the south eastern defences and extramural settlement of Little Chester, Derby, 1971-2" in Derbyshire Archaeological Journal vol. 122 (2002)
- D. F. Williams, Roman amphorae from Derby, Little Chester. London: English Heritage, 1991 (AML Report, 28/91)
