= Hinchwick =

Village in Gloucestershire, England

Coordinates: 51.96829°N 1.79035°W

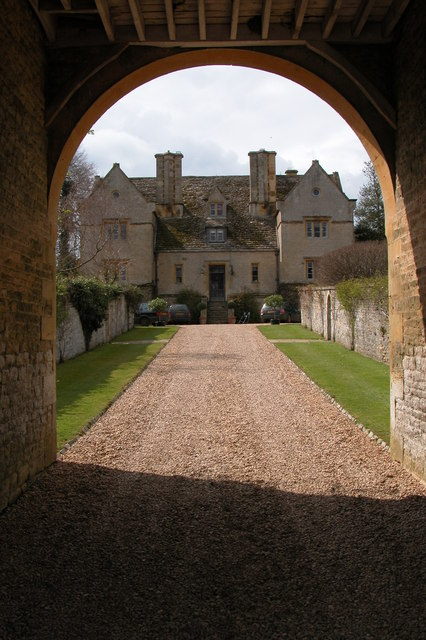
Hinchwick Manor (photo Philip Halling)

Hinchwick is a small village in Gloucestershire, England at grid reference SP145300.

Hinchwick Manor was built by architect Charles Robert Cockerell in 1826.
