= Little Chester =

Suburb of Derby, England

Coordinates: 52.9313°N 1.47257°W

Little Chester: Chester Green
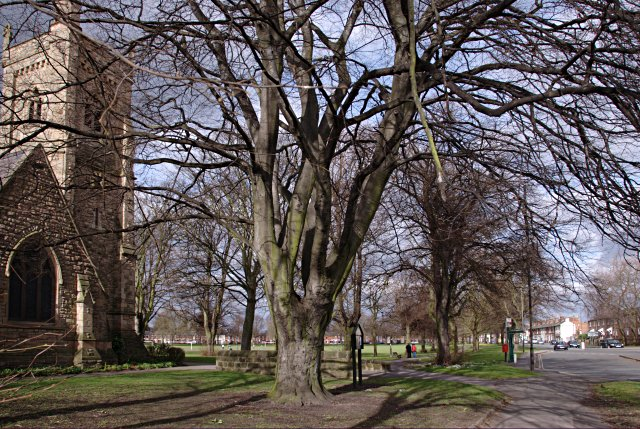
- Chester Green and St Paul's Church

- Location within Derbyshire
- OS grid reference: SK355372
- Unitary authority: Derby
- Ceremonial county: Derbyshire
- Region: East Midlands
- Country: England
- Sovereign state: United Kingdom
- Post town: DERBY
- Postcode district: DE1
- Dialling code: 01332
- Police: Derbyshire
- Fire: Derbyshire
- Ambulance: East Midlands
- UK Parliament: Derby North

Little Chester, also known as Chester Green after the area of open parkland at its centre, is a suburb of the city of Derby, in Derbyshire, England. It is located approximately 0.6 miles (0.97 km) north of the city centre, on the east bank of the River Derwent. It forms part of the Darley ward along with Darley Abbey and the West End. Little Chester is the oldest inhabited part of Derby, having been the location of a fortified Roman settlement called Derventio.

== History ==
=== Roman times ===
It is the most historic area of Derby, the location of a large fortified Roman settlement, which they called Derventio. This fort, which later became a town, was not only protected the river crossing, but also stood at the junction and gave protection to five Roman roads. The most important was Ryknield Street, which connected Gloucester and the West Country with Yorkshire and the North East.

Little of the Roman settlement remains at Little Chester today, apart from two Roman wells, one on Marcus Street and the other in the garden of the vicarage of St Paul's Church. However, a series of excavations in the last fifty years have established both its importance and prosperity, including the discovery of an underfloor heating system on Parker's Piece and an abundance of coins.

=== Later times ===
The district has been continually inhabited since the departure of the Romans, next being settled by Angles. Chester Green, the open land which is the centrepiece of the area, is first referred to by name in written records dating back to 1495, and has been a public park since 1866. In modern times the name Chester Green, applied to the district as a whole, seems to have overtaken the "correct" name in popular usage.

Little Chester was formerly a township in the parish of St Alkmund, in 1866 Little Chester became a separate civil parish, on 26 March 1898 the parish was abolished and merged with Derby. In 1891 the parish had a population of 966. It is now in the unparished area of Derby, in the Derby district.
