= Chester Road =

Chester Road can mean:

- Part of the A183 road from South Shields to Chester-le-Street
- The A452 road in England. It runs from Leamington Spa, Warwickshire to Brownhills in Staffordshire, following the line of the ancient drover's road called the Welsh Road
- The main road out of Manchester towards Chester, making up part of the A56
- Chester Road North Ground, a cricket ground in Kidderminster
- Chester Road railway station, on the Redditch/Bromsgrove-Birmingham New Street-Lichfield Cross-City Line in the West Midlands
- A residential street in the Whitehall area of Bristol
