= Dodford =

Dodford may refer to:

- Dodford, Northamptonshire, England
- Dodford, Worcestershire, England
