= A445 road =

Road in Warwickshire

Coordinates: 52.32213°N 1.51201°W

A445

Route information
- Length: 9.3 mi (15.0 km)

Major junctions
- North end: Ryton on Dunsmore
- A45 A452 A429
- South end: Warwick

Location
- Country: United Kingdom

Road network
- Roads in the United Kingdom; Motorways; A and B road zones
← A444	→ A446

The A445 road is a road in Warwickshire, England. It runs between the town of Warwick and the A45, also passing through the north of Leamington Spa. The road provides the major link between Leamington/Warwick and north-east Warwickshire, including Rugby and the M45/M1 motorways. The M45/M1 provided the major route to London until the early 1990s but have now been superseded by the M40, which passes to the south of the Leamington/Warwick conurbation.

== Route ==
The A445 begins in central Warwick at a junction with the A425 as Smith Street, and the first part of it is single carriageway. A shared use footway / cycle track is parallel to the road. It then merges into the A429 very briefly before heading towards Leamington. It forms the main road from Warwick to Leamington, crossing into the latter town at the Portobello Bridge over the River Avon near that river's junction with the River Leam. Just east of the bridge the A445 has a junction with the B4099 with the B route heading into central Leamington and the A445 skirting the north of the town.

Following a short multiplexed section with the A452 in the Lillington area of Leamington the A445 has a junction with the B4453. It turns north for a short distance until reaching the edge of Leamington. It returns to its ruling north-easterly direction through the village of New Cubbington, and then heads out into open countryside. It only passes through two more villages, Bubbenhall and the small settlement of Stretton-on-Dunsmore, where it meets the A423. A short distance after this junction the A445 ends at its junction with the A45. This junction was formerly notorious as an accident blackspot but it has been considerably reprofiled and made safer. From there, the eastbound A45 leads to the A4071 into Rugby and also the M45/M1 to Northampton, London and the South East England.
