= Stonebridge, West Midlands =

Junction between the A45 and A452 roads in England

Coordinates: 52°26′44″N 1°41′13″W

Stonebridge (AKA Stonebridge Island or Stonebridge Roundabout) is a flyover–and–roundabout junction of the A45 and A452 roads in West Midlands, England. The A45 crosses the River Blythe at this point. Stonebridge lies on the former Welsh Road, a drover's road connecting North Wales to South East England; parts of the A452 roughly follow the Welsh Road. The A45 is the primary east–west connecting road between Coventry and Birmingham. It seems possible that Stonebridge, as the crossing-point of two historic major roads, was formerly an inhabited place, of which little or no trace now remains. The former Stonebridge Railway ran via Stonebridge, though there was apparently no station there. Stonebridge road junction was planned to be modernised in the first half of 2016, at a cost of £500,000. Stonebridge Highway is the official name for a section of the A45 where it nowadays bypasses Coventry to the south.
