= A45 road =

Major road in England

A45

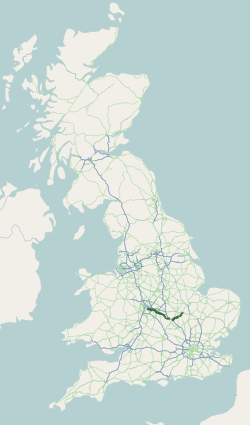

Route information
- Maintained by Birmingham City Council, Solihull Metropolitan Borough Council, Coventry City Council, Warwickshire County Council, West Northamptonshire Council, North Northamptonshire Council, National Highways
- Length: 75.2 mi (121.0 km)

Major junctions
- West end: A4540 in Birmingham

- M42 in Birmingham; A46 near Coventry M45 near Dunchurch; A5 near Weedon Bec; M1 near Upper Heyford; A43 near Northampton; A6 in Higham Ferrers

- East end: A14 / A605 in Thrapston

Location
- Country: United Kingdom
- Counties: West Midlands, Warwickshire, Northamptonshire
- Primary destinations: Birmingham, Birmingham Airport, Coventry, Northampton, Wellingborough

Road network
- Roads in the United Kingdom; Motorways; A and B road zones

The A45 is a major road in England. It runs east from Birmingham past the National Exhibition Centre (NEC) and the M42, then bypasses Coventry and Rugby, where it briefly merges with the M45 until it continues to Daventry. It then heads to Northampton and Wellingborough before running north of Rushden and Higham Ferrers and terminating at its junction with the A14 in Thrapston.

Prior to the construction of the M6 motorway, it was the main route from the Midlands to Ipswich and to the Haven ports. When the A1-M1 link road section of the current A14 opened in 1994, most of the A45 to the east of Cambridge was re-designated as the A14 and some sections to the west were downgraded to B-roads (including the B645 between Higham Ferrers and St Neots).

== History ==
The original (1923) route of the A45 ran from Birmingham to Ipswich. The road was extended to Felixstowe in 1935, replacing the A139. Around the same time, the A45 was rerouted around the south of Coventry when the city's southern bypass was completed.

Initially, the A45 passed through Ipswich on its way to Felixstowe; when the Ipswich bypass was completed in 1985, the road was diverted to pass over the Orwell Bridge which opened in 1982.

A bypass for the village of Eltisley was built in 1972, along with a bypass on the B1040 road. The 3-mile (4.8 km) £8 million St Neots bypass opened in December 1985 on what was then the A45.

=== Bypasses and realignments ===
- Small Heath (now bypassed to the south)
- Meriden (now bypassed to the north)
- Coventry (an early bypass to the south)
- Daventry (the route now follows the ring road)
- Weedon Bec and Flore (bypassed to the north)
- Northampton (bypassed, the former route being A4500)
- Higham Ferrers (bypassed to the west of the town)
- Birmingham Airport (realigned to the south to allow expansion of the runway)

=== Re-designation ===
When the new A14 link road between the A1 near Huntingdon and the M1 (at its junction with the M6) was opened to traffic in the mid-1990s, the Cambridge-to–Felixstowe stretch of the A45 was re-designated as the A14 (and many of the villages the route went through were bypassed) and the St Neots–to–Cambridge section became part of an extended A428. The route through Felixstowe at the end of the A14 is now the A154.

== Route ==
=== Birmingham to Dunchurch ===
The road starts on the A4540 Birmingham Ring Road, bypassing Small Heath and crossing the B4145. It passes over the River Cole and meets the A4040 at a grade-separated junction at the Swan Shopping Centre in Yardley. It meets the B425 at traffic lights in Sheldon, then enters the borough of Solihull. The section of the A45 from Birmingham city centre to the M45 is all dual carriageway – urban dual carriageway with traffic lights until Birmingham Airport, then rural grade-separated between the airport and Coventry. The Bickenhill Junction (grade-separated) intersects with the B4438, a dual carriageway access road for the airport, the NEC and Birmingham International railway station. In December 2024 the new A4545 opened, replacing part of the southern section of the B4438, providing an alternative direct link to the M42. There is another grade-separated junction with the M42 junction 6 (three level grade separation with roundabout). On this junction, there is also access to the National Motorcycle Museum. The road meets the A452 at Stonebridge at a grade separated junction and passes over the River Blythe where the road briefly enters Warwickshire. Meriden is bypassed to the north. The Heart of England Way passes under the road, and the road enters the borough of Coventry.

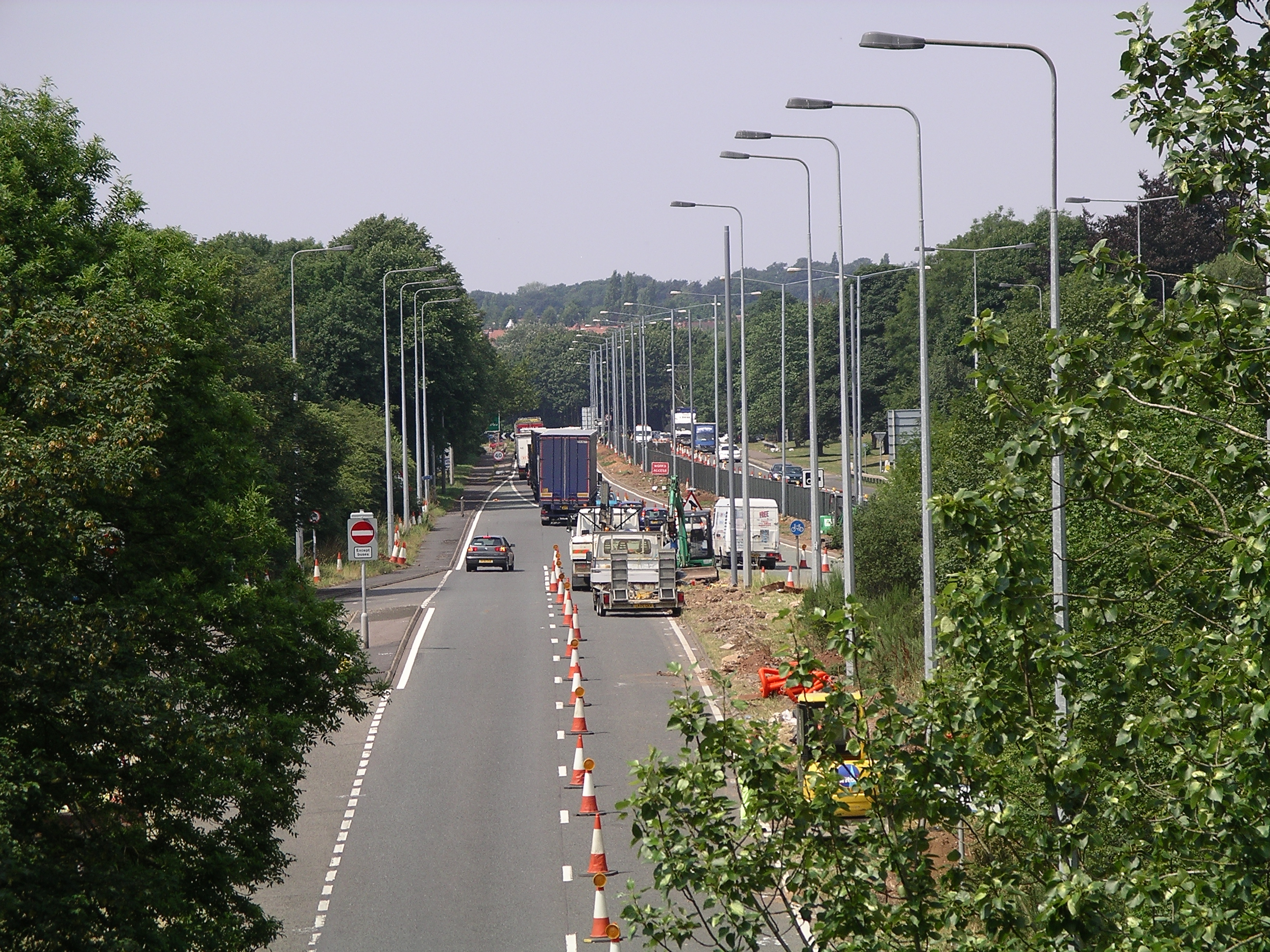
A45 in south Coventry (road works July 2006)

The A45 becomes an urban road and skirts the south side of Coventry, crossing the A4114 near Allesley Park, the B4101 at Tile Hill, West Coast Main Line, A429 and B4113. Beyond here the road takes a more rural nature, with a grade-separated junction with the A46 and the A444 (three level roundabout with underpass for the A46 and the A444, and an overpass for the A45). Between here and the next junction, the A45 runs concurrent with the A46. The Tollbar End roundabout was one of the busiest in the Midlands. It had exits for the A46 north / Coventry Eastern Bypass, Coventry Airport and B4110. In early 2017, the Tollbar End roundabout was upgraded and the junction is now a roundabout interchange with an underpass for the A46. Crossing the River Avon, the road re-enters Warwickshire. The A423 exits to the south-east at a (grade-separated) forked junction near the former Peugeot factory. The A445 crosses at a roundabout near Ryton on Dunsmore, followed by the War Memorial Roundabout with the B4455 Fosse Way. This Portland stone memorial obelisk on the roundabout just north of Stretton-on-Dunsmore commemorates King George V's review of the 29th Division before they were sent to Gallipoli. There is a further grade-separated junction with the A4071 and B4453 towards Rugby. The final roundabout on this section is the start of the M45 and the B4429. For 2 miles (3.2 km), the A45 runs concurrent with the M45 until a fairly new junction beyond Dunchurch. The B4429 carried the A45 until the new junction was built.

=== Dunchurch to Thrapston ===
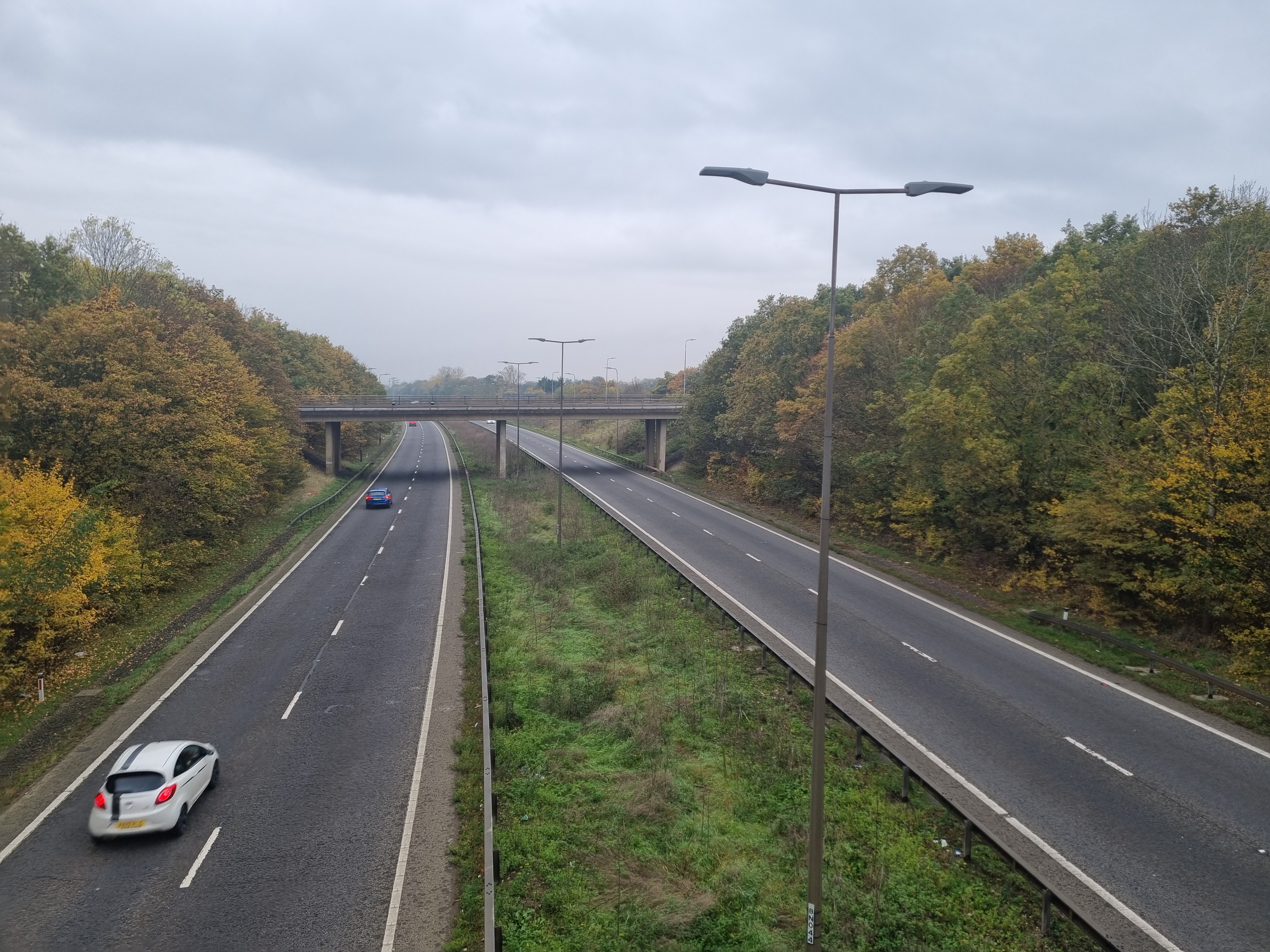
A45 in south of Northampton.

Heading towards Daventry, the road is single carriageway. The road passes two prisons: HMP Onley and HMP Rye Hill. After Willoughby, the road enters Northamptonshire, where it crosses the Oxford Canal and Grand Union Canal near Braunston. The Jurassic Way crosses the road here. The road enters Daventry and briefly runs concurrent with the A425 heading to Leamington Spa, then heads south-east on the Daventry bypass, here called the Stefen Way. The road meets the B4038 at a roundabout where the A425 exits. The road heads west past Dodford and then bypasses Weedon Bec, crossing the West Coast Main Line and Grand Union Canal and then meets the A5 at a roundabout constructed as part of the Daventry Development Link Road realignment which opened on 15 November 2018. This road also bypasses Flore, before meeting the grade-separated M1 junction 16, briefly running concurrent with the M1.

The A45 resumes at M1 Junction 15 as a dual carriageway, heading around the south side of Northampton. It then meets the older route (made of sections of the A5076 and A4500) at the A45 / A508 grade-separated junction, near Northampton High School. It then crosses the River Nene and Nene Way, and after that, there is a large grade-separated junction with the A428 and the A5095). This section is concurrent with the A43, which exits at a grade-separated junction near Weston Favell. The grade-separated junction with the end of the A5076 is also the exit for Billing Aquadrome. The road has a grade-separated junction with the B573 near Earls Barton. The road then meets the Wellingborough bypass (A509) at a roundabout, although there is a segregated turn lane for westbound traffic wishing to continue on the A45. It runs concurrently with the A509 to the grade-separated junction near the bridge over the River Nene, where the A509 exits south near Irchester Country Park. East of Wellingborough, the road crosses the Midland Main Line. There is a grade-separated junction for the A5001 into Rushden and the route runs alongside the River Nene, offering a second turning to Rushden at a roundabout with the A5001 again; at this second junction, the original route to the A1 has been reclassified the B645. At the roundabout with the A6 near Higham Ferrers, it starts the follow the former route of the A605. The section of dual carriageway from the M1 now ends at the next roundabout and the route from there is now single carriageway. This is the start of the Raunds bypass. The next roundabout is with the B663. The route bypasses Ringstead and the A45 finishes at a grade-separated junction with the A14 (roundabout with overpass for the A14) near Thrapston.

== Junction list ==
County	Location	mi	km	Jct	Destinations	Notes
West Midlands	Birmingham	0.0	0.0		A4540 / B4128 to Coventry Road / M5 / M6 / A38(M) – Small Heath	Western terminus
West Midlands	Birmingham	2.8– 3.1	4.5– 5.0		A4040 – Acocks Green, Yardley	Grade-separated junction
West Midlands	Bickenhill	7.0– 7.6	11.3– 12.2		B4438 – Solihull, Hampton, Bickenhill, Catherine-de-Barnes	Grade-separated junction
West Midlands	Bickenhill–Hampton in Arden boundary	7.8– 8.3	12.6– 13.4		M42 to M6 / M1 / M40 / M5 – Solihull, Lichfield	Grade-separated junction; destinations signed westbound only; M42 junction 6
West Midlands	Bickenhill–Hampton in Arden boundary	8.7– 9.3	14.0– 15.0		A452 – Brownhills, Leamington A452 to A4177 – Brownhills, Warwick, Chelmsley Wood, Coleshill, Balsall Common, Kenilworth	Grade-separated junction; Leamington signed eastbound only, To A4177 and other destinations signed westbound only
West Midlands	Great Packington–Meriden boundary	9.9– 10.6	15.9– 17.1		To B4102 – Fillongley, Maxstoke, Meriden	Grade-separated junction; To B4102 and Fillongley signed eastbound only
West Midlands	Coventry	14.1– 14.5	22.7– 23.3		A4114 south-east – Coventry	North-western terminus of A4114
West Midlands	Coventry	17.4	28.0		A429 (Kenilworth Road) – City centre, Earlsdon, Kenilworth	
West Midlands	Coventry	18.8– 19.3	30.3– 31.1		A46 south to A444 north / A452 / M40 / A4114 – Leamington, Warwick, Banbury, Coventry, Kenilworth, Whitley	Grade-separated junction; A444, to A114 and Coventry signed westbound only, Banbury and Kenilworth eastbound only; western terminus of A46 concurrency
West Midlands	Coventry	19.6– 19.9	31.5– 32.0		Coventry Airport	Grade-separated junction; no eastbound exit
West Midlands	Coventry	20.1– 20.6	32.3– 33.2		A46 north to M6 / M69 – Leicester, Coventry (north & east); B4110 (London Road) – Willenhall	Eastern terminus of A46 concurrency
Warwickshire	Ryton-on-Dunsmore	20.9– 21.1	33.6– 34.0		A423 south – Southam	Grade-separated junction; eastbound exit and westbound entrance; northern terminus of A423
Warwickshire	Ryton-on-Dunsmore	22.5	36.2		A445 south (Leamington Road) / Wolston Lane to A423 – Southam, Wolston	Northern terminus of A445
Warwickshire	Thurlaston	26.5	42.6		A4071 north-east to B4453 – Rugby, Princethorpe	Grade-separated junction; To B4453 and Princethorpe signed westbound only
Warwickshire	Thurlaston	27.4	44.1		B4429 (Coventry Road) – Dunchurch, Thurlaston	Information signed eastbound only; western terminus of M45 concurrency; western terminus of M45
Warwickshire	Dunchurch	28.9– 29.4	46.5– 47.3		M45 east to M1 south – London, Northampton; B4429 – Dunchurch, Southam, Banbury	No access from A45 west to M45 east or from M45 west to A45 east; Southam and Banbury signed westbound only; eastern terminus of M45 concurrency
Northamptonshire	Daventry	35.4	57.0		A361 north (Drayton Way) to M1 north / M6 – Kilsby	Western terminus of A361 concurrency
Northamptonshire	Daventry	36.0	57.9		Braunston Way (A4256 east) – Town centre, Drayton	Western terminus of A4256
Northamptonshire	Daventry	36.8	59.2		A425 west / Browns Road – Leamington, Staverton, Southam	Western terminus of A425 concurrency
Northamptonshire	Daventry	37.4– 37.6	60.2– 60.5		A361 south – Banbury, Banby	Grade-separated junction; eastern terminus of A361 concurrency
Northamptonshire	Daventry	38.4	61.8		South Way (A425 east) / London Road (B4038) / M1 / M5 / A361 – Town centre	To M1 and M5 signed eastbound only; eastern terminus of A425 concurrency
Northamptonshire	Dodford–Weedon Bec boundary	41.8	67.3		A5 (Watling Street) to M40 – Hinckley, Nuneaton, Milton Keynes, Oxford, Weedon	To M40 and Oxford signed eastbound only, Weedon westbound only
Northamptonshire	Upper Heyford	45.1	72.6		M1 north to M6 – The North, Birmingham, Coventry, Leicester A4500 east – Northampton	Coventry signed eastbound only; western terminus of M1 concurrency; western terminus of A4500; M1 junction 16
Northamptonshire	Hunsbury Meadows–Rothersthorpe boundary	48.4– 48.9	77.9– 78.7		A43 south to M40 – Oxford, Northampton (west)	Northampton signed westbound only; western terminus of A43 concurrency; M1 junction 15A
Northamptonshire	Milton Malsor–Grange Park boundary	50.9– 51.2	81.9– 82.4		M1 south – London, Milton Keynes A508 south / Saxon Avenue – Stony Stratford, Grange Park	Eastern terminus of M1 concurrency; western terminus of A508 concurrency; M1 junction 15
Northamptonshire	Grange Park	51.6– 51.9	83.0– 83.5		Grange Park	Grade-separated junction; westbound exit and entrance
Northamptonshire	Wootton–East Hunsbury boundary	52.1– 52.4	83.8– 84.3		Collingtree Park, East Hunsbury, Wootton	Grade-separated junction; no westbound entrance
Northamptonshire	Northampton	53.1– 53.4	85.5– 85.9		Town centre (A508 north), Sixfields, Hunsbury, Hardingstone	Grade-separated junction; Town centre signed eastbound only; eastern terminus of A508 concurrency
Northamptonshire	Hardingstone–Northampton boundary	54.0– 54.7	86.9– 88.0		Brackmills	Grade-separated junction
Northamptonshire	Northampton	54.6– 55.1	87.9– 88.7		A428 – Town centre, Bedford, Brafield, Abington	Grade-separated junction
Northamptonshire	Northampton	56.4– 56.9	90.8– 91.6		A43 north to A508 – Kettering, Market Harborough, Billing, Weston Favell	Grade-separated junction; eastern terminus of A43 concurrency
Northamptonshire	Billing–Northampton boundary	57.7– 58.2	92.9– 93.7		Cogenhoe, Billing	Grade-separated junction
Northamptonshire	Earls Barton	60.0– 60.5	96.6– 97.4	10	Earls Barton, Grendon, Castle Ashby, Whiston	Earls Barton signed eastbound only, Whiston westbound only
Northamptonshire	Earls Barton–Great Doddington boundary	61.8	99.5	11	B573 – Great Doddington, Earls Barton	
Northamptonshire	Great Doddington–Wellingborough boundary	63.1	101.5		A509 north (Wilby Way) / Bourton Way to A6003 – Kettering, Wellingborough (west), Corby, Wilby	Western terminus of A509 concurrency
Northamptonshire	Wellingborough	64.1– 64.4	103.2– 103.6	14	A509 south – Wellingborough, Milton Keynes, Newport Pagnell, Little Irchester, Great Doddington	Little Irchester and Great Doddington signed westbound only; eastern terminus of A509 concurrency
Northamptonshire	Irchester–Rushden boundary	66.4	106.9	16	A5001 east – Rushden, Irchester	Eastbound exit and westbound entrance
Northamptonshire	Rushden	67.5	108.6	17	A5001 east / B645 (Northampton Road) – Rushden, Higham Ferrers	Roundabout; western terminus of A5001
Northamptonshire	Higham Ferrers	69.1	111.2		A6 / A5028 south (Station Road) to A43 – Kettering, Corby, Bedford, Higham Ferrers, Finedon, Irthlingborough, Rushden	Northern terminus of A5028
Northamptonshire	Thrapston	75.2	121.0		A14 – Kettering, Huntingdon, Cambridge A605 east – Peterborough, Thrapston, Titchmarsh, Oundle	Eastern terminus; southern terminus of A605; A14 junction 13
1.000 mi = 1.609 km; 1.000 km = 0.621 mi: Concurrency terminus; Incomplete access
