= A446 road =

Road in Birmingham

Coordinates: 52.54917°N 1.72966°W

A446

Route information
- Length: 11 mi (18 km)

Major junctions
- South end: Coleshill
- M6 J4 M42 J9 A452 A4097 A4091 A453; A38
- North end: Sutton Coldfield

Location
- Country: United Kingdom

Road network
- Roads in the United Kingdom; Motorways; A and B road zones
| ← A445 | → A447 |

The A446 is an A road in Zone 4 of the Great Britain numbering scheme.

== History ==
The 1922 route of the A446 was Leamington – Kenilworth – Coleshill – Lichfield, which over the years has been curtailed to its current route.

== Route ==
=== Stonebridge – Bassets Pole ===
The A446 starts as a dual carriageway south of Coleshill off the A452. It crosses the M6 at junction 4, almost immediately the road takes the course of the Coleshill bypass, the former route going through the centre of the town. There are 2 roundabouts on the bypass, one of which is the former route of the A47. North of Coleshill the route becomes single carriageway and runs parallel to the M42, eventually crossing it at junction 9. From here to Bassets Pole, the route is single carriageway, running alongside the M6 Toll. The road terminates at the Bassets Pole roundabout, meeting the A38 and A453.

== Former routes ==
=== Bypasses and Realignments ===
- Coleshill (Now bypassed by a dual carriageway to the West)

=== Downgrading ===
- Bassets Pole – Lichfield (Now part of A38)
