= A452 road =

Road in the West Midlands

Coordinates: 52.38881°N 1.64819°W

A452

Route information
- Length: 40 mi (64 km)

Major junctions
- South end: Royal Leamington Spa
- M40 J13/14 A425 A445; A46 A429 A4177; A45 A446; M6 J5; A47; A38 A5127 A453 A4041 A454 A461 A4124; A5
- North end: Brownhills

Location
- Country: United Kingdom
- Primary destinations: Royal Leamington Spa, Kenilworth, Birmingham, Brownhills

Road network
- Roads in the United Kingdom; Motorways; A and B road zones
← A451	→ A453

The A452 is a road in England, which runs from Royal Leamington Spa, Warwickshire to Brownhills in the West Midlands. It is the major link to the M6 motorway for both Leamington and Warwick in addition to serving as Leamington's link to the M40 motorway and to Coventry. This road runs all the way to Chester, if you stay on it long enough.

Between Brownhills and Kenilworth it follows the line of the ancient drover's road called the Welsh Road, which probably has pre-Roman origins.

== Route ==
The A452 starts south of Leamington Spa with two separate spurs running to junctions 13 (southbound) and 14 (northbound) of the M40 motorway. The road leading to J14 was originally part of the A41. These meet and the road heads into Leamington along Europa Way, a road newly created at the same time as the M40 extension in that area. The road into Leamington is signed as a primary route but most maps show it as non-primary. After running up the western edge of the town centre, the road crosses the A425 and then heads north. Just before Kenilworth, the A452 crosses the A46, the major dual carriageway linking the M40 to Coventry. The A452/A46 is thus the principal route between Leamington and Coventry.

Beyond the A46 junction, the A452 passes through Kenilworth and then on towards Balsall Common, although the signed route to Balsall deviates from the official A452 at this point, instead directing drivers along the B4103 past Kenilworth Castle. Halfway between Kenilworth and Balsall Common the road meets the A4177 from Warwick.

Exiting north from Balsall Common, the road becomes a dual carriageway. It then arrives at a major roundabout known as Stonebridge, where it crosses the A45 between Coventry and Birmingham. In recent years a flyover for the A45 has been built to alleviate traffic congestion on the roundabout. The A452 continues as dual carriageway for a short while, but then exits with the dual carriageway section continuing as the A446 up to M6 motorway, junction 4.

Having left the main dual carriageway the A452 runs through Chelmsley Wood, right on the eastern edge of the Birmingham conurbation and then loops around the outside of Castle Bromwich, running parallel and adjacent to the M6 at that point. It then crosses the M6 (at junction 5), before heading northeast through Pype Hayes, Erdington, New Oscott and the semi-urban areas of Streetly and Shire Oak, between Walsall and Sutton Coldfield, before terminating at a junction with the A5 in Brownhills.
