= Warwickshire Beer Company =

Brewery in Cubbington, Warwickshire, England

The Warwickshire Beer Company is a microbrewery company based in Cubbington, Warwickshire, England. The company, which is based in the old village bakery, began life in late 1998 after the closure of the Warwickshire Brewery a few miles away in Kenilworth. Much of the brewing equipment is second hand (standard practice in small companies) the hot liquor tanks came from a Scottish and Newcastle brewery, the fermenters are old dairy tanks. The company started with six barrels but currently have around 26.

At present there are eight types of bottled beer produced by the brewery along with the capability to produce bespoke beverages, that is brewed to the purchaser's liking. One of the best known examples of this was Brakes Fluid made to celebrate Leamington F.C.'s (nickname The Brakes) FA Cup run in 2005. In 2003 a special brew Old Warwick was produced to raise money for Guide Dogs for the Blind something which is now an ongoing process. Nine beers are available in barrels. All WBC drinks are approved of by CAMRA the British Campaign for Real Ale.

There are currently three pubs run by the company, the first of which was purchased in 2000 and the second in 2004. The first two are both called The Market Tavern. One of these is located in Southam and the other in Atherstone. The third pub currently called Bodaceas is in Atherstone and was taken over in 2007, followed by The Jolly Brewer in Rugby. In 2008 two major national stores also stock certain WBC beers, a significant milestone in the development of the brewery.
