= Bassetts Pole =

Coordinates: 52.578709°N 1.774807°W

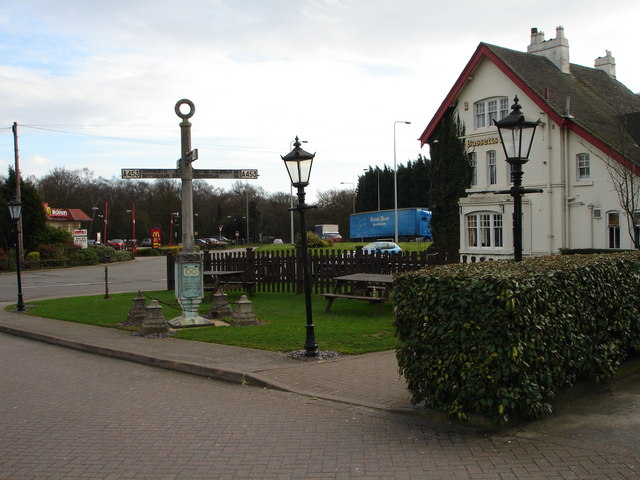
- Bassett's Pole Public House and signpost; the post marks the boundary between the counties of Staffordshire and Warwickshire

- Location within Warwickshire
- OS grid reference: SP153979
- District: North Warwickshire
- Shire county: Warwickshire
- Region: West Midlands
- Country: England
- Sovereign state: United Kingdom
- Post town: SUTTON COLDFIELD
- Postcode district: B75
- Dialling code: 0121
- Police: Warwickshire
- Fire: Warwickshire
- Ambulance: West Midlands
- UK Parliament: Sutton Coldfield

Bassetts Pole is an area at the Staffordshire–West Midlands–Warwickshire tripoint. Population details can be found under Middleton, Warwickshire. It is sited on the A446 London Road at its junction with the A38.

== History ==
The name derives from a marker post set up by the Bassett family - owners of the Drayton Estate (hence the nearby village of Drayton Bassett). This delineated the boundary with the Middleton estates of the De Frevilles/Willoughbys/Grazebrooks and the Shenstone estates of the Grazebrooks.

== Transport ==
The site is located on the A446, with easy access to the A38; the Sutton Coldfield bypass and Junction T3 of the M6 Toll motorway. The nearest railway station is Four Oaks, approximately 4 miles (6.4 km) away.
