= Bubbenhall =

Village in Warwickshire, England

Coordinates: 52°20′52″N 1°28′04″W

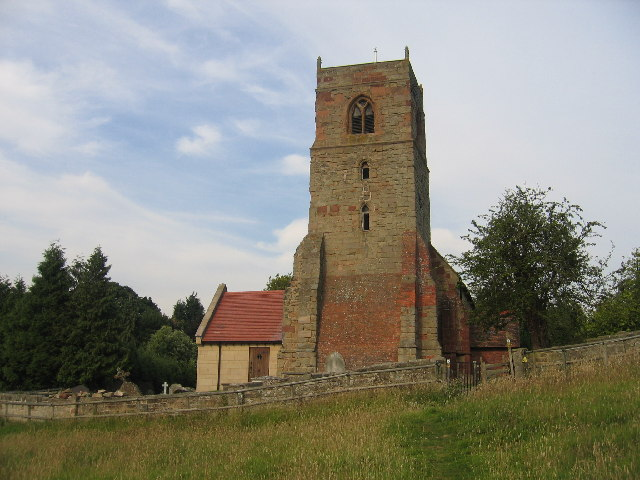
St. Giles's Church in Bubbenhall

Bubbenhall is a village and civil parish in the Warwick district of Warwickshire, England.

The village lies off the A445 road, about 5 miles (8 km) north-northeast of Leamington Spa and 5.5 miles (9 km) southeast of Coventry. According to the 2021 Census it had a population of 650 residents. It has two pubs, The Three Horseshoes and The Malt Shovel and a sports field with a village hall.

Just to the east of the village is Ryton Pools Country Park and to the south is Weston and Waverley Wood. Nearby villages include Ryton-on-Dunsmore, Stretton-on-Dunsmore, Baginton, Stoneleigh and Weston under Wetherley.

St. Giles Church was built in 1153 and enlarged in 13th & 14th century.
