= St Mary's Church, Cubbington =

Historic church in Cubbington, Warwickshire, England

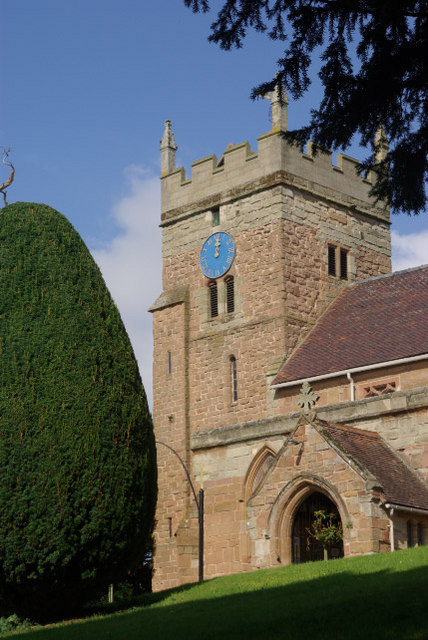
- Interactive map of St Mary's Church, Cubbington
- Location: Cubbington, Warwickshire, England
- Coordinates: 52.31211°N 1.49697°W

Listed Building – Grade I
- Official name: Church of St Mary
- Designated: 11 July 1967
- Reference no.: 1364926

St Mary's is the parish church of Cubbington, Warwickshire, England. Denominationally it is part of the Church of England.

The original church building was constructed in the early 12th century with many alterations taking place since. The building is Grade I listed.
