= A429 road =

Road in England

A429

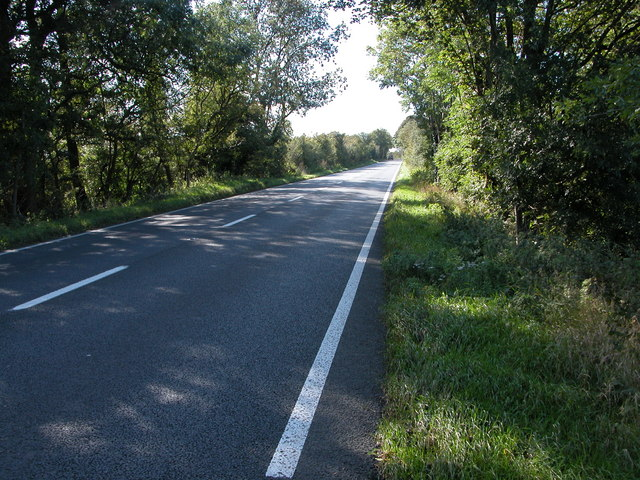
- The A429 near Northleach, Gloucestershire

Route information
- Length: 66.6 mi (107.2 km)

Major junctions
- South end: Chippenham; 51.5163°N 2.1217°W
- M4 A350 A433 A419 A435 A417; A40 A436 A424; A44 A3400 A422; A46 M40 A4189 A425 A445 A452; A45 A4053
- North end: Coventry; 52.4034°N 1.5139°W

Location
- Country: United Kingdom
- Primary destinations: Cirencester; Warwick

Road network
- Roads in the United Kingdom; Motorways; A and B road zones
← A428	→ A430

The A429 is a main road in England that runs in a north-northeasterly direction from junction 17 of the M4 motorway (4 miles (6.4 km) north of Chippenham in Wiltshire) to Coventry in the West Midlands.

== Route ==
For much of its length, the A429 follows the route of the Roman Fosse Way. It links the M4 in Wiltshire to Coventry in the West Midlands, by way of Malmesbury (bypassed), Crudwell, Cirencester, Stow-on-the-Wold, Moreton-in-Marsh, east of Stratford-upon-Avon, Warwick, and Kenilworth.

== History ==
When first designated in 1922, the A429 ran from Chippenham to Warwick.

In the 1970s the route was extended from Warwick to Coventry on the old route of the A46.

In the 1990s the dual carriageway between Chippenham and the M4 motorway became part of the extended A350.

Heading northeast, the road meets the Fosse Way near the southwestern outskirts of Cirencester. Until circa 1937 this junction was some 2.6 miles (4.2 km) further south, near Jackaments Bottom; when RAF Kemble (now Cotswold Airport) was built, the A429 was diverted south of the airfield to follow an upgraded existing road through Kemble village, and the section of the A429 north of the airfield became a continuation of the A433.

The road breaks at the A46 junction north of Warwick and resumes some 3 miles (4.8 km) further north at a junction with the A452, in the north of Kenilworth.

The section between Warwick and Kenilworth was declassified shortly after the opening of the A46 Kenilworth Bypass to encourage traffic to use the A452 or A46 instead.

== See also ==
- British road numbering scheme
- A roads in Zone 4 of the Great Britain numbering scheme
