= A453 road =

Road in the Midlands

A453

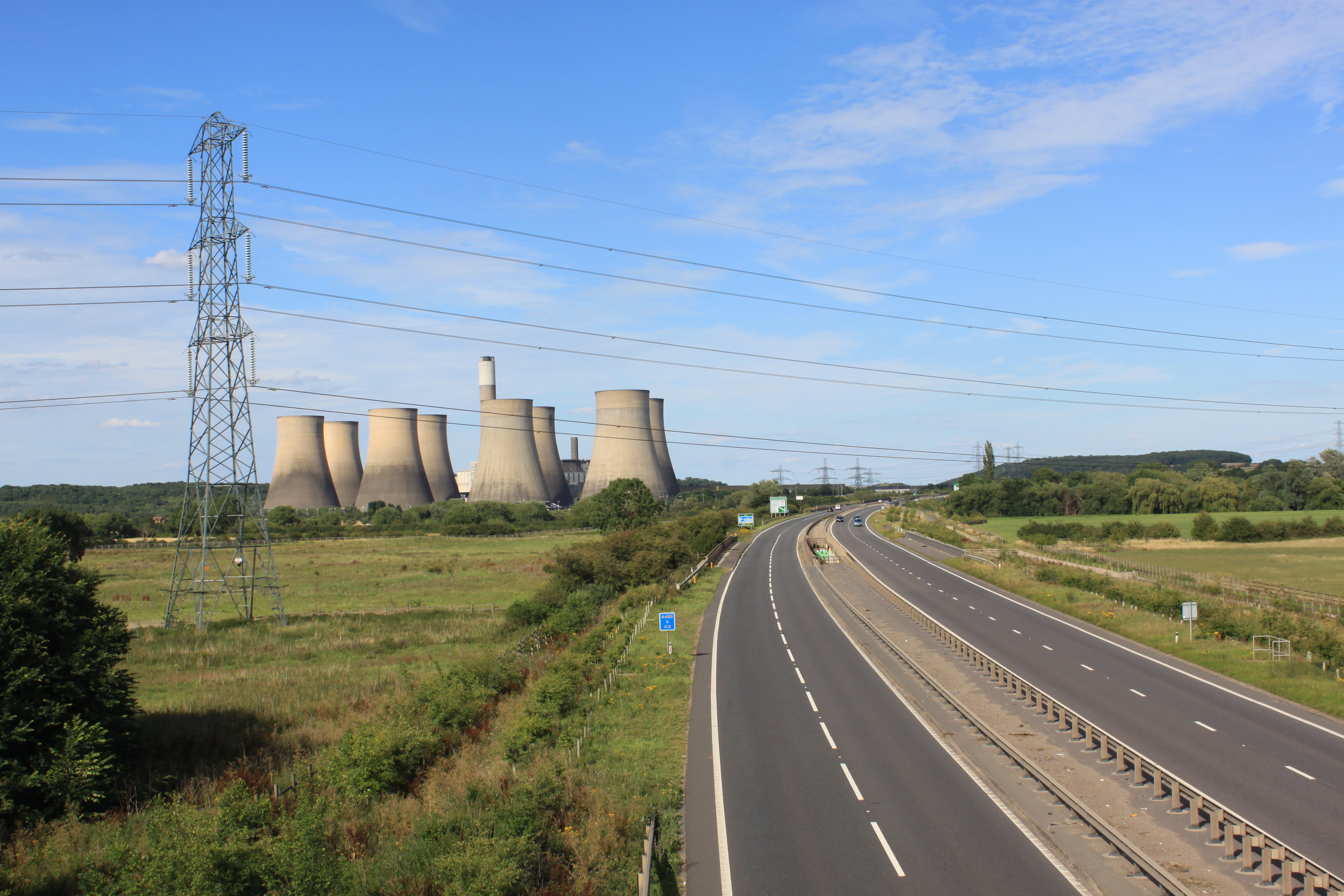
- The A453 "Remembrance Way" dual carriageway between the M1 motorway and Nottingham

Birmingham-Tamworth
- Length: 12.4 mi (20.0 km)
- southwest end: 52.5168°N 1.9013°W
- Major intersections: A34 A452 A5127; A38; A5; A51
- northeast end: 52.6290°N 1.7050°W

Castle Donington-Nottingham
- Length: 16.4 mi (26.4 km)
- southwest end: 52.7977°N 1.3700°W
- Major intersections: A42 J23a & 24 → M1 motorway A50; A6; A52
- northeast end: 52.9453°N 1.1532°W

Location
- Country: United Kingdom

Road network
- Roads in the United Kingdom; Motorways; A and B road zones
← A452	→ A454

The A453 road was formerly the main trunk road connecting the English cities of Nottingham and Birmingham. However, the middle section of this mainly single-carriageway road has largely been downgraded to B roads or unclassified roads following the construction of the parallel M42-A42 link around 1990. The M42 was originally meant to pass further north than it does, and to join the M1 at Sandiacre in Derbyshire. The M42/A42 does not enter Derbyshire, but instead joins the M1 closer to the A453 junction at Kegworth. The A42 shadows the former A453 from Appleby Magna to Castle Donington. The road historically connected the East Midlands with the West Midlands.

== Route ==
=== Perry Barr to Tamworth ===
The southern stretch of the existing A453 runs as a non-trunk route from the A34 in north Birmingham under the M6 motorway to the A452 road, and on through Sutton Coldfield. Historically this section was classified as the B4139 and was upgraded in 1935. It starts at the point where the A34 crosses the Chase Line at Perry Barr railway station. On the right hand side is Birmingham City University and the road passes through Witton. As Aldridge Road it becomes a dual carriageway and crosses the River Tame to the right of the old zig zag Perry Bridge. To the left is Perry Park, and it passes under the M6, becoming College Road. It crosses the Tame Valley Canal, and there is a left turn for the dual-carriageway Kingstanding Road (B4138) in Perry, the former Roman road Ryknild Street. In Upper Witton there is a roundabout and Perry Barr fire station is on the left next to Perry Common library, with The College High School on the right, and there are a crossroads and roundabout, with left turns for Kingstanding, and the road passes through Perry Common. On the right is St Mary's College, Oscott, a Roman Catholic seminary of the Archdiocese of Birmingham, and the road meets Chester Road (A452) at a crossroads.

In Boldmere the road continues after the crossroads as College Road, but becomes Jockey Road where the B4149 meets from the left at a roundabout at New Oscott. It crosses the Cross-City Line with Sutton Coldfield Grammar School for Girls on the left. Near St Peter's Church in Maney and the Horse and Jockey pub it runs concurrently with the A5127 through the town centre of Sutton Coldfield, splitting in two one-way sections at a roundabout, and passing Sutton Coldfield railway station. It passes over and under two railway lines, then passes the police and fire station, with Birmingham Metropolitan College (former Sutton Coldfield College) and Bishop Vesey's Grammar School on the right.

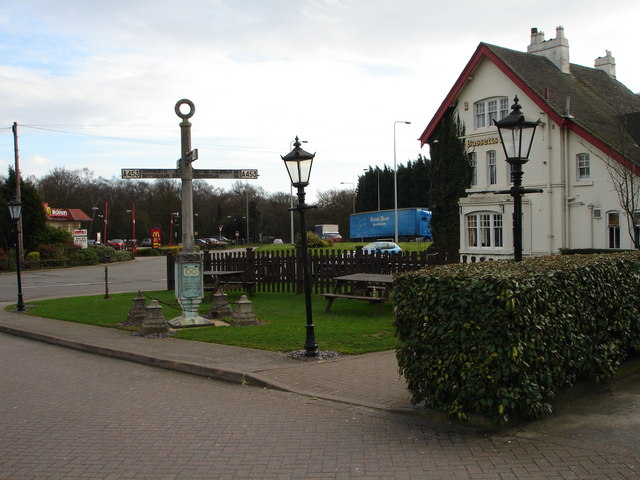
Bassetts Pole

The original route of the A453 separates from the A5127 at the Tamworth Road junction at Doe Bank, passing under the Cross-City Line. It passes a crossroads, with Moorhall Golf Club to the left, and Whitehouse Common Road (B4148) to the right. It crosses the M6 Toll, then Collets Brook, where it enters Staffordshire, and the district of Lichfield at Hints. When the A38 was dualled, the A453 was moved to the west, to meet at the Bassetts Pole roundabout. This was not only the meeting point of the Birmingham to Nottingham road, and the A38 (former A446), but is also the meeting point of Warwickshire, Staffordshire and the former West Midlands county. At the roundabout is the Bassetts Pole Harvester, and a McDonald's. As a dual-carriageway trunk road at Carroway Head, it meets the B4151 from the left (for Roughley), and becomes the parish boundary between Hints and Drayton Bassett, and a single carriageway, as Sutton Road. It is only a trunk road for 3 miles (4.8 km) until it meets the A5, after crossing the Heart of England Way, Bourne Brook and the former A5, now the B5404, at Mile Oak, Fazeley.

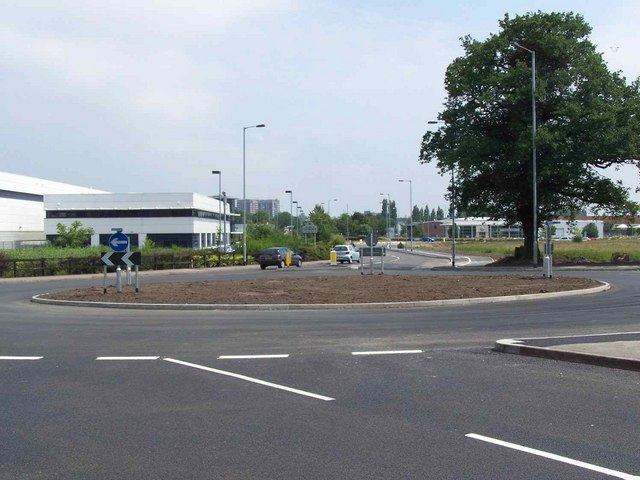
Entering Tamworth

As the non-trunk Bonehill Road it crosses the Birmingham and Fazeley Canal, where it enters the district of Tamworth. It meets the A51 at a large roundabout, and continues as the dual-carriageway Riverdrive, concurrent with the A51, meeting the A4091 (for Drayton Manor Theme Park) to the south, then crosses the River Tame. The A51 leaves to the south at a large roundabout-shaped junction, partly Ankerdrive and Bolebridge Street, known as The Egg which straddles the River Anker, and passes the Tamworth Odeon. It continues northwards as Saxondrive, an inner ring road for Tamworth, with a roundabout for Tamworth railway station then continues westwards as Offadrive to meet its former route through Tamworth (partly the B5493), where it meets the A513 near the bridge over the West Coast Main Line. King Offa was the King of Mercia, a Saxon kingdom, with its capital as Tamworth. Previously the A453 continued along Bonehill Road then across Lady Bridge and along Aldergate in Tamworth town centre.

=== Former route through Ashby de la Zouch ===
The downgraded former middle section continued through Tamworth and Ashby-de-la-Zouch to the M1 motorway. Prior to the construction of the M42 the road was north of its current route, running through Castle Donington, Long Eaton and Beeston. The section through Castle Donington is now unclassified south of the A50, north of the A50 it is the B6540, and from Long Eaton to Nottingham is part of the A6005.

=== Breedon on the Hill to Kegworth ===
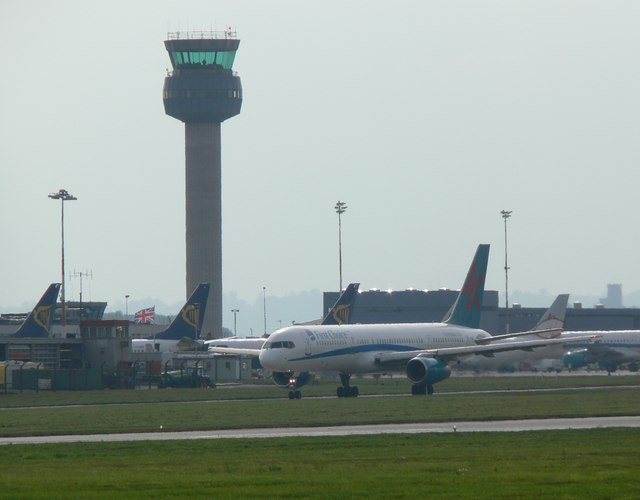
East Midlands Airport

The only part of the section between Tamworth and the M1 now designated as the A453 is a short new link west from the limited-access A42 junction 14] to the old route in North West Leicestershire. From the A42, the downgraded section of the proposed M42, it follows Moor Lane as a non-trunk road. This route was formerly the A447, and continued southwards to Swannington, its present terminus. The A447 also went through Tonge. It meets the former route of the A453 at a T junction, which it follows for one mile. It passes through Isley Walton (Isley cum Langley) as Walton Hill. The Donington Park motor circuit is close to the north and there is a left turn for Castle Donington, which is the former route. The road is dual carriageway for a short section and meets a roundabout. The route follows the southern edge of East Midlands Airport, along the former B5400 to Charnock Hill. There are two right turns for Diseworth, and at Long Whatton and Diseworth it leaves the former B road (which would have passed through one of the terminal buildings, across the airfield, to Kegworth), and continues on a new section of road when the airfield was extended from the former RAF Castle Donington in the mid-1960s. Continuing as Ashby Road, there is a roundabout for the Pegasus Business Park, home of Central Networks East (former East Midlands Electricity, owned by PPL Corporation since April 2011. This section also serves several large hotels associated with the airport.

=== Kegworth to Nottingham ===
The A453 becomes trunk road again just north of M1 junction 23A where it joins a spur of the A42 at a roundabout on the parish boundary of Kegworth, which was built when the A42 opened. Later the Donington Park services were added in July 1999. It runs parallel to the motorway to M1 junction 24, to link to the motorway and the A50 road. On the opposite side of the M1 from Molehill Farm, on 8 January 1989, the Kegworth air disaster took place. There is a right turn (Ashby Road) for Kegworth, which is the continuation of the former B road route across the airfield. This section of the A453 from junction 24 of the M1 to the airport was opened as the £250,000 Kegworth Link Road on 3 September 1975 by a local county councillor, Mrs Kathleen Wildsmith. The road was built by Galliford and Sons. Previously traffic went straight through Kegworth. There are plans to bypass Kegworth from the south, to join the A453 roundabout at the Donington Park services roundabout.

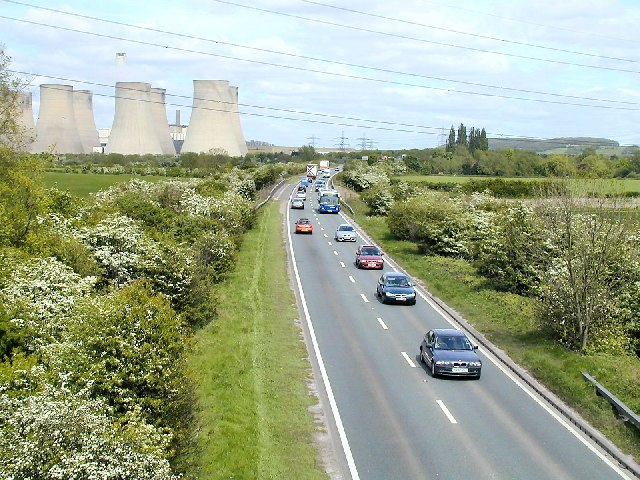
In the Nottingham direction with Ratcliffe-on-Soar Power Station

The A453 then continues as a trunk road from the M1 for the remaining 11 miles (18 km) to Nottingham, with most of its traffic originating from the A50, and the rest from the A42. This section of the road follows the route of the former B679. When the M1 11-mile section opened, from Markfield to the Lockington Interchange, on Friday 3 December 1965, the main route to Nottingham was nothing more than this narrow B-road.

A new section of road was built from junction 24 of the M1 to Ratcliffe-on-Soar Power Station (which opened in 1968), as the Link road from Ratcliffe Power Station to M1. The 1.8 mile section started construction in 1965, to take 19 months, to cost around £680,000, and the CEGB paid 55% of the total cost. It was difficult to build a bridge over the railway near the power station. Only two railway tracks could be closed, at a time, only on Sundays. The road section was designed to be dualled 'at a later date', with three lanes in each direction. The M42 was originally planned, in 1966, to meet the M1 at Lockington. The eventual A42 would meet the M1 at Lockington. The consulting engineers were CS Allott and Son, and it was built by Cubar Construction. One fifth of the route is in Nottinghamshire, and the rest was in Leicestershire.

The section opened as the A648 on the afternoon of Monday 13 February 1967. Right from the start, it was a dangerous road, one of the worst in Nottinghamshire. Vehicles went much too fast, notably motorbikes, resulting in collisions with stationary vehicles turning right, at the power station junction.

The whole section became the A648 when fully completed in 1970, extending along the present B679 to West Bridgford, then the A453 in 1978, when it was diverted from its Long Eaton route. Between 1922 and 1953 the A648 was the road from Brighouse to Denholme, now the A644.

At Ratcliffe-on-Soar it crosses the River Soar, where the road enters Nottinghamshire and the district of Rushcliffe. It crosses the Midland Main Line, and there is a left turn for East Midlands Parkway railway station, which opened in January 2009. The railway from here to Nottingham railway station directly shadows the A453, to the north. There is a left turn for the power station, owned by E.ON UK, and Thrumpton. After Thrumpton the road follows a former unclassified road (Green Street) to Clifton. There are two left turns for Barton in Fabis. The road ascends the top of Brands Hill and Mill Hill, where it enters the City of Nottingham as Barton Lane.

A new roundabout gives access to the Clifton South Park & Ride site that is linked to central Nottingham by the Nottingham Express Transit (NET) tramway. The road then meets Nottingham Road from Gotham (the former main road to Kegworth, the B679) at a roundabout, with the Crusader (former Hungry Horse and before that, Hardy & Hanson's pub) on the left. It passes the site of the now demolished (March 2012) Man of Trent on the right. It passes Clifton police station on the right, then the Clifton campus of Nottingham Trent University on the left, as Clifton Lane. The road here became a dual carriageway in the early 1970s when the Clifton Bridge was dualled, with an exit for the B679 (the former route), for West Bridgford, and meets the A52 at an interchange. The interchange was built when the bridge was dualled in 1972. It crosses the Trent concurrently with the A52, then exits to the east as Queens Drive where it is no longer a trunk road. This section of road opened as the B679 when the first Clifton Bridge was opened in May 1958. It later became the A6019 (now a shorter road next to the railway station), and took a course slightly to the east. The road was dualled in the late 1970s.

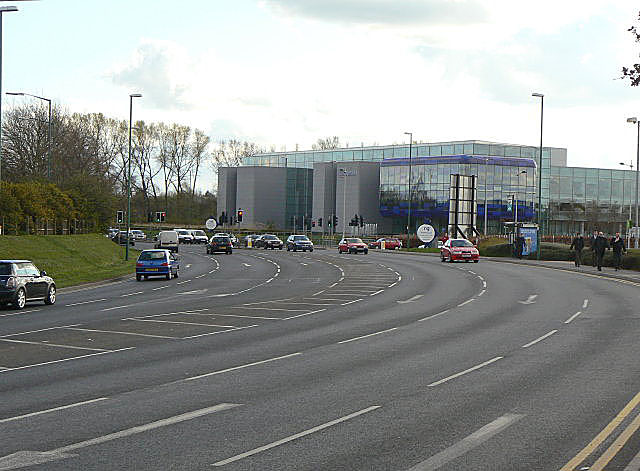
Experian on Queens Drive

To the left, on the side of the Trent, is the Restaurant Sat Bains, one of only two Michelin-starred restaurants in Nottingham. The Trent Valley Way crosses at the bridge. The main road previously into Nottingham from the south was the B680 (Queens Walk). There is a Park and Ride to the south, the Queen's Drive Retail Park to the north, and the Pork Farms factory is to the left. The road leaves the side of the River Trent, and heads north, where it widens and passes Landmark House of Experian, to the left, at the junction of Enterprise Way (former King's Meadow Road, for Castle Marina Park, the headquarters of Speedo International Limited and the ng2 business park). There is a left turn for Castle Bridge Road and the Castle Marina Retail Park), and it passes the Riverside Retail Park on the left. The road widens again, and at traffic lights Waterway Street West (A6019) leaves to the right, which is the direction for through-traffic. The road ahead, the terminus of the A453, crosses the railway line, then the Nottingham Canal, passing HMRC on the left, and meets Castle Boulevard (the former A453, now A6005) next to the former Nottingham Post building.

== Upgrades ==
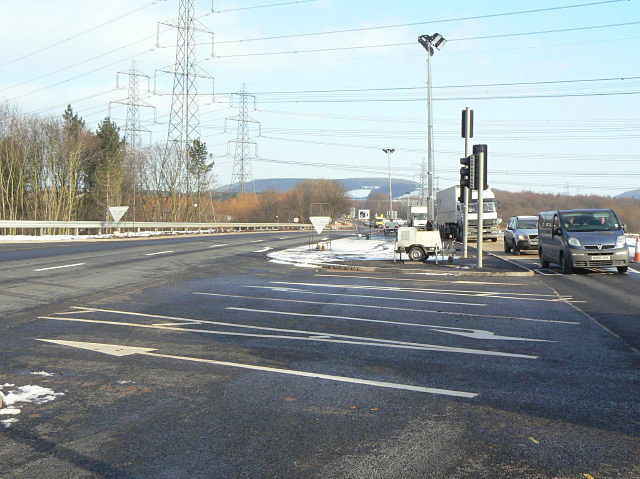
The only dual-carriageway section between the M1 and Clifton next to the power station

As of 2007 the section between the M1 motorway and Nottingham city centre required a major upgrade as it could no longer cope with the volumes of traffic that used it. From the morning peak until around 1100am, the traffic could often back up from the Nottingham Trent University Clifton campus right the way back to the Ratcliffe on Soar power station adding around 10 to 15 minutes to the journey time along this route. The problems are worse in term time where the light controlled pedestrian crossing at the university can stop traffic so often that the long tailbacks described are caused. There is a marked difference to the levels of traffic on this section outside term time.

In March 2006 the Highways Agency announced plans for a £90m upgrade to this road including the construction of a dual-carriageway section between the M1 and the Crusader Public House island (near Clifton) to ease traffic congestion. Draft Orders and an Environmental Statement for the scheme were published on 29 January 2009, with the forecast cost rising to £168m. Construction would have started in 2010, with the road open to traffic in 2012/13. However, due to national fiscal constraints, the project was postponed in May 2010. In March 2012, the Secretaries of State for Transport and Communities and Local Government approved the proposals with some minor modifications. Work was expected to start in early 2013 and, in January 2013, a Highways Agency press release confirmed that work had begun.

The 2011 Autumn Statement announced planned investment of £160m in widening the road between Nottingham, the M1 and East Midlands Airport, one of a series of supply-side measures which the government was undertaking "to rebalance and strengthen the economy in the medium term".

Parts of the A453 between the M1 and Clifton Bridge were due to be closed in July and August 2013, but work has been postponed until late August as it clashed with the closure of Nottingham railway station for major track and signalling replacement.

These upgrade works were completed in June 2015 and the road is now two lane dual carriageway from the M1 to the junction for the Clifton park and ride and then four lane single carriageway through the suburb of Clifton to where the road meets the A52.

== Safety ==
- On 8 January 1989, British Midland Flight 92, a Boeing 737-400 aircraft crashed onto the embankment between the A453 and the M1, whilst attempting an emergency landing at East Midlands Airport in Leicestershire. There were no ground casualties nor vehicular damage on the roads as a result of the crash, however 47 passengers on board the aircraft were killed and a further 74 passengers and crew members were seriously injured.
- In June 2008 the Road Safety Foundation announced that a 5 kilometres (3.1 mi) single carriageway stretch of the A453 between the A38 and Tamworth was the most improved road for fatal and serious injury accidents. With an 88% reduction in crashes resulting in death and disabling injuries was rated as Green by the Foundation. Staffordshire County Council have undertaken a number of measures to upgrade the road including traffic lights, speed limit reduction, village gateway treatment, central islands and improved pedestrian facilities. These resulted in a reduction in fatal and serious collisions from eight in 2001–3 to one in 2004–6.

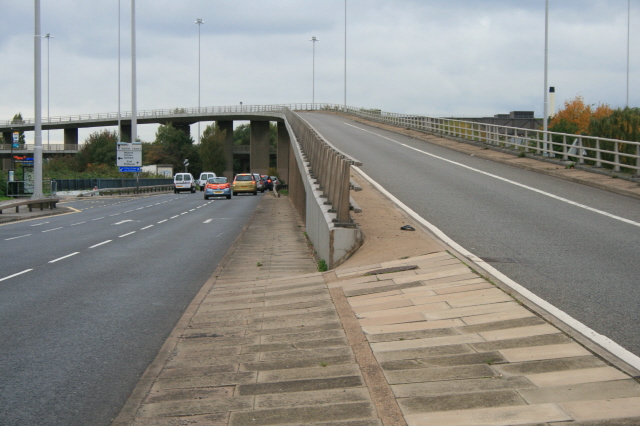
Flyover at the A52 in Lenton

== Remembrance Way ==
As of March 2015 the dual carriageway section between the M1 J24 and the Clifton park & ride is known as "Remembrance Way" in honour of the 453 British servicemen and women who at that time had lost their lives in Afghanistan.
