= Dodford, Northamptonshire =

Village in Northamptonshire, England

Coordinates: 52.23°N 1.10°W

Dodford
- Dodford within Daventry District

- Location within Northamptonshire
- Population: 203 (2011 Census)
- OS grid reference: SP613605
  - London: 73.6
- Unitary authority: West Northamptonshire
- Ceremonial county: Northamptonshire
- Region: East Midlands
- Country: England
- Sovereign state: United Kingdom
- Post town: Northampton
- Postcode district: NN7
- Dialling code: 01327
- Police: Northamptonshire
- Fire: Northamptonshire
- Ambulance: East Midlands
- UK Parliament: Daventry

Dodford is a village in West Northamptonshire, England. Prior to local government changes in 2021 it was within the Weedon Ward of Daventry District. The village is just north of the A45 road 1 1/2 miles (2.4 km) west of Weedon. The population of the civil parish at the 2011 Census was 203. It is 3 1/2 miles (5.6 km) east of Daventry and 10 miles (16 km) west of Northampton. It is also close to junction 16 of the M1 motorway. The parish consists of some 1,384 acres (560 ha) and is bounded on the east by the A5 trunk road which is the old Roman road of Watling Street. Most of the village and parish sits astride the valley of an east-flowing stream which is a tributary of the River Nene.

== Medieval history and later ==
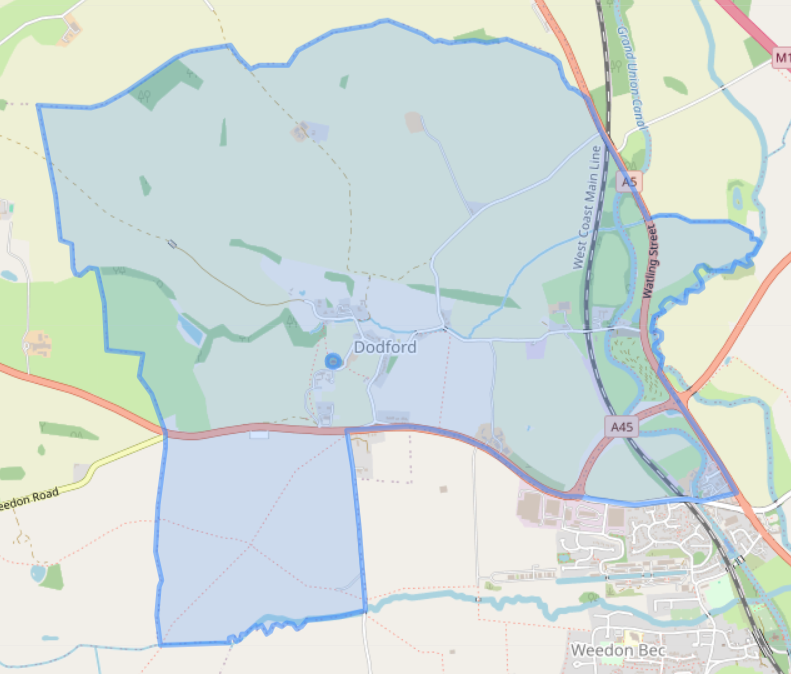
Dodford ancient parish boundaries (the blue circle marks the location of St Mary's Church)

The village's name means 'Dodda's ford'.

There are considerable earthworks around the village on the northern side of the stream, which indicate that Dodford was a larger settlement than it is today. Many of these earthworks have been ploughed out in recent years, but the evidence has been recorded of their existence. These earthworks suggest that there was a large scale de-population or a considerable movement of the village. Dodford is mentioned in an Anglo-Saxon charter of 944. The village is recorded in the Domesday Book of 1086 as a manor of three hides belonging to Robert, Count of Mortain (who was the half-brother of William the Conqueror), with a recorded population of 22 including a priest. In 1222 the manor of Dodford was acquired by William de Keynes, who enclosed much of the land including a deer park which lay to the south of the village, between it and what is now the A45 between Daventry and Weedon. In 1673 it is recorded that 39 people paid Hearth Tax. By the early part of the 18th century, there were 21 dwellings in the village, and a map dated 1742 shows the layout of the village much as it is today. In 1801 the village is recorded as having 205 residents.

== St Mary the Virgin church ==
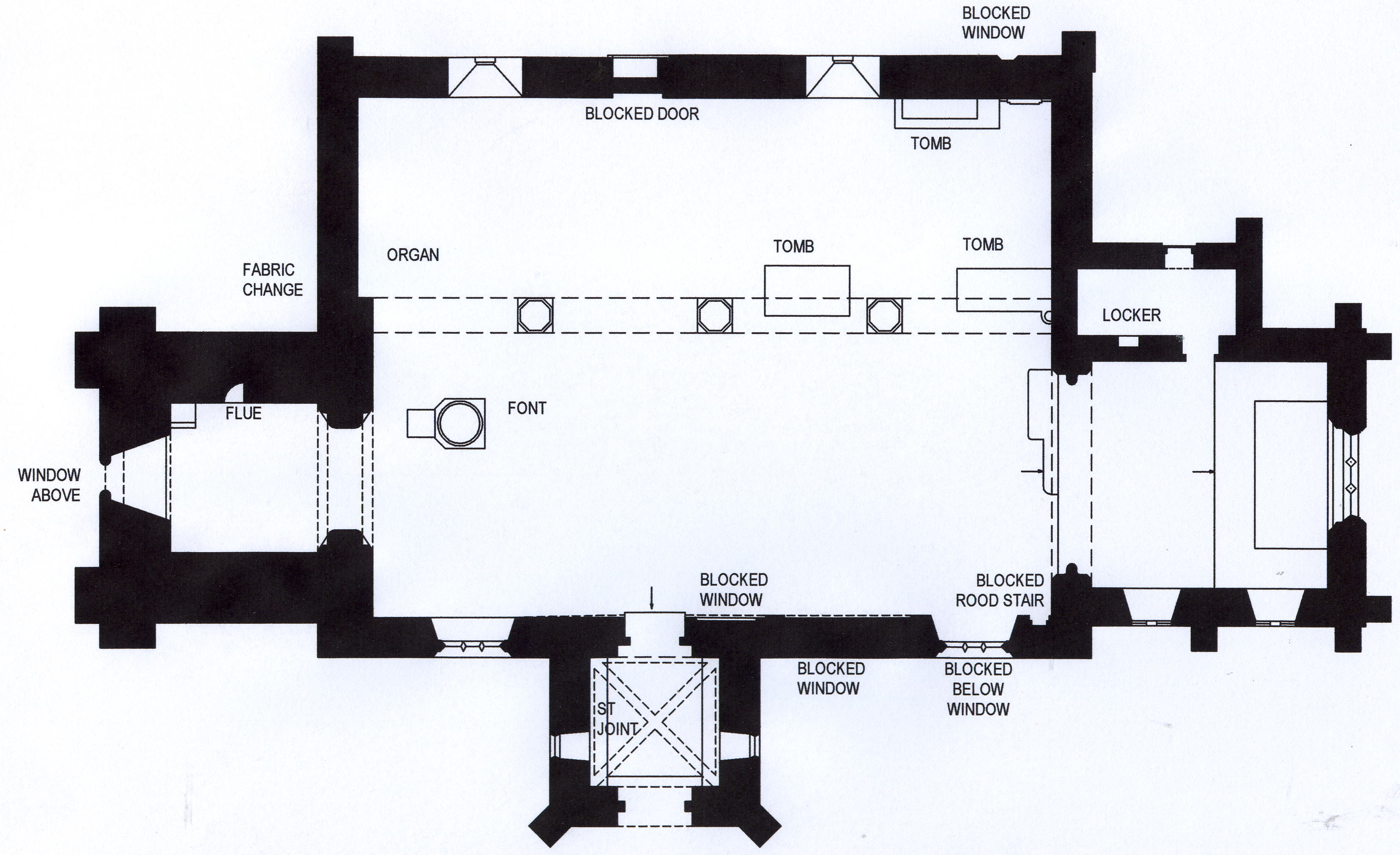
Plan of Dodford Church

Dodford has a Grade I listed parish church, called St Mary the Virgin. It was founded by the Normans in 1066, rebuilt by Ralph de Keynes in 1100, and the tower and north chapel were added by William de Keynes in 1221. St Mary's has a nave with a north aisle and a clerestory on the north side only. The arcade, of four bays, is 14th century. The south wall of the nave has two plain 12th-century splayed windows, of which the west one is now blocked, and part of the plain arch of a doorway; on the exterior there is much herringbone masonry. The south porch is of two storeys. The chancel was rebuilt in the 19th century. The church contains an elaborately carved 12th-century font.

Dodford church has the distinction of being the first church that the antiquary Elias Ashmole (founder of the Ashmolean Museum) is known to have visited with the aim of recording its inscriptions, armorial bearings etc. Ashmole visited Dodford church on 15 April 1657, and his handwritten notes are now in the Bodleian Library in Oxford.

There is a tall 13th-century west tower which was structurally crumbling until major repairs in the late 20th century. It contains a ring of six bells, each of which was cast in a different year between 1614 and 1907. The bells hang in a timber frame placed diagonally in the tower. This is a weak layout and the bells remained neglected and unringable for several decades until essential frame strengthening was carried out in 2007.
