= Welsh Road =

The Welsh Road, also known as the Welshman's Road or the Bullock Road, was a drover's road running through the English Midlands, used for transporting cattle from North Wales to the markets of South East England.

Drovers and their herds would follow the line of Watling Street from Shrewsbury and over Cannock Chase to Brownhills, from where the Welsh Road ran through Stonnall, Castle Bromwich, Stonebridge, Kenilworth, Cubbington, Offchurch, Southam, Priors Hardwick, Boddington, Culworth, Sulgrave, Syresham, Biddlesden, and Buckingham.

The age of the route is not known. The parish records of Helmdon record money being given in 1687 "to a poor Welshman who fell sick on his journey driving beasts to London", but many lengths of the road coincide with parish or manorial boundaries, suggesting that it probably formed an ancient trackway dating to the pre-Roman era.

The northern section of the route from Brownhills to Stonebridge was made a turnpike by the Broughton, Chester and Stonebridge Turnpike Trust in 1759, becoming better known as the Chester Road. This part of the route is now broadly followed by the A452. South of Kenilworth the route remained unturnpiked and is now largely followed by minor roads and footpaths, often still referred to as the "Welsh Road".

The A550, running 6 miles from Eastham to Queensferry, is also called the Welsh Road. It links the conurbations of Merseyside in England and Deeside in Wales.

== Bibliography ==
- Bonser, Kenneth J. (1970), The drovers: who they were and how they went: an epic of the English countryside, Macmillan, ISBN 0-333-10301-7
- Colyer, Richard J. (1974), "Welsh Cattle Drovers in the Nineteenth Century - Part 2", National Library of Wales Journal, XVIII (3): 312–44, ISSN 0011-4421
- Colyer, Richard J. (1976), The Welsh cattle drovers: agriculture and the Welsh cattle trade before and during the nineteenth century, University of Wales Press, ISBN 0-7083-0592-X
- Drew, John H. (1967), "The Welsh Road and the drovers", Transactions & Proceedings, Birmingham Archaeological Society, 82: 38–43
- Duignan, William Henry (1912), Warwickshire place names, Oxford University Press, pp. 122–123, hdl:2027/umn.319510020569861
- Elrington, C. R. (1957), "Communications", in Stephens, W.B. (ed.), The City of Birmingham, The Victoria History Of The County Of Warwick, vol. VII, Oxford: Oxford University Press, pp. 25–42
