= Cubbington =

Village in Warwickshire, England

Coordinates: 52.312°N 1.498°W

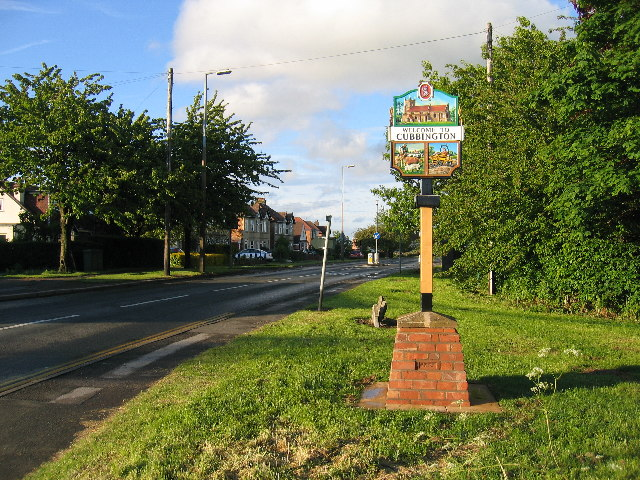
- Village sign on the boundary with New Cubbington at the top of Windmill Hill

- Location within Warwickshire
- Population: 3,929 (2011 census)
- OS grid reference: SP 340 685
- Civil parish: Cubbington
- District: Warwick
- Shire county: Warwickshire
- Region: West Midlands
- Country: England
- Sovereign state: United Kingdom
- Post town: Leamington Spa
- Postcode district: CV32
- Dialling code: 01926
- Police: Warwickshire
- Fire: Warwickshire
- Ambulance: West Midlands
- UK Parliament: Kenilworth and Southam

Cubbington is a village and civil parish with a population of 3,929, adjoining the north-eastern outskirts of Leamington Spa, Warwickshire, England, approximately 3 miles from the town centre. Welsh Road, running through the village crossroads, was an old sheep drovers' route connecting London and Wales. Since the 1950s when the village expanded there have been two parts to the village: Cubbington proper which was the old village core, and New Cubbington which is to the west, although both are referred to as Cubbington. Topographically the highest point of the village sits about 100 metres (330 ft) above sea level while its lowest is about 60 metres (200 ft). For many years the electorate for Cubbington was represented in government by the MP for Warwick and Leamington but for the 2010 UK Elections it moved to the new Kenilworth & Southam constituency.

== Cubbington history ==
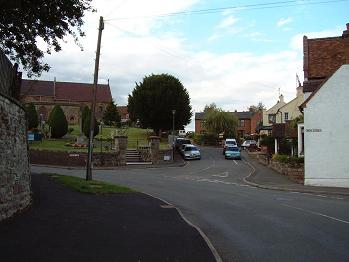
Queen Street, Cubbington with The Kings Head and St Mary's parish church

The place-name 'Cubbington' is first attested in the Domesday Book of 1086, where it appears as Cobintone and Cubintone. The name means 'the town or settlement of Cubba's people'. A related name is the source of the name of the village of Cublington to the southeast in Buckinghamshire. In early November 1605 a group of men, including Robert Catesby, who were involved in the Gunpowder Plot, passed through the village. They were fleeing from London after the arrest of Guy Fawkes. They were on their way to Wales (via Warwick Castle to steal fresh horses), after a meeting at Dunchurch, near Rugby.

Apart from the parish church, Cubbington's notable former landmark was the windmill which stood at the top of Windmill Hill, the section of Welsh Road which crosses the road to Rugby. The first mention of the windmill was in 1355 in a dispute between the Prior of Kenilworth and the Abbot of Stoneleigh. No mention of it was made again however until it appeared on a map of Warwickshire over 400 years later in 1789. The sails of the windmill could be turned using a wheel to face in the optimum direction in relation to the prevailing wind.

Cubbington Manor House is said to be haunted by a young girl who starved to death when her mentally-ill father locked them all in the house and refused to speak to the outside world. Until the mid-1820s the population of Cubbington was larger than that of Leamington Spa, which now dwarfs Cubbington. Cubbington men served in the First World War and Second World War. In the First World War 139 men served their country, 31 of whom lost their lives. In the Second World War 10 men lost their lives. Although the village never received direct hits from Luftwaffe bombers, two bombs landed in Cubbington Woods near the village after a raid on Coventry about 10 miles (16 km) to the north.

=== New Cubbington ===
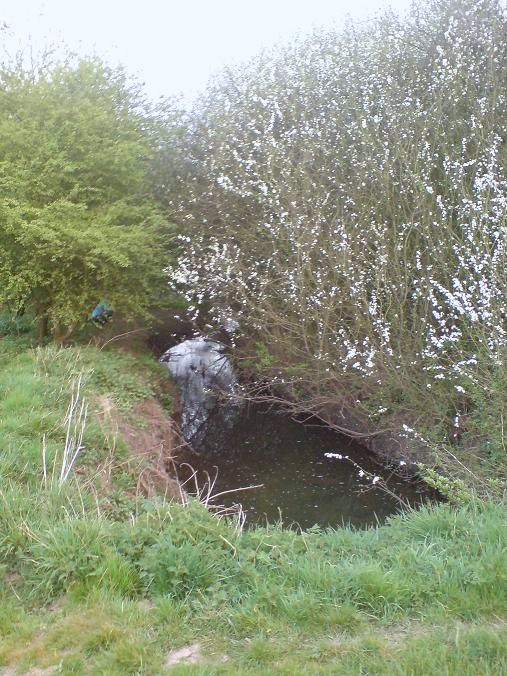
Pingle Brook

New Cubbington is a part of the village. It links the old village of Cubbington with Lillington, a suburb of Leamington Spa. The first buildings in the area were along the main village road, the Rugby Road. Most of the area was developed as a planned housing estate after the Second World War. Plans were drawn up in 1946 and a mixture of medium to large semi-detached houses, detached houses and bungalows were built in the 1950s. The land was originally owned by Baron Leigh, then owner of Stoneleigh Abbey, and many of the roads are named after towns in Scotland such as Dunblane Drive and Stirling Avenue.

The Rugby Tavern public house existed long before the houses and was originally some 330 feet (100 m) east of where it now stands. It was opened for the first time where it now stands by Arthur Savage and his family on King George V's Silver Jubilee in 1935. They ran the pub for many years all living above the premises. His granddaughter Micheline Julie Warnier born there in 1944, her mother Betty Savage worked behind the bar and was married to Gilbert Victor Julian Warnier; the family left for another public house around 1961. It was renovated in the early 2000s after being gutted by a fire.

As a planned estate, it contains a variety of local shops including two hairdressers, a bicycle shop, two off-licences, a pet shop, traditional and ethnic takeaways, and a grocery. A post office that existed for many years in Kelvin Road was closed in January 2004. There is one open space for children's recreation that has swings and two football goals. Telford Infant and Junior Schools are the nearest schools to the area. The 67A bus linking old Cubbington with Leamington Spa runs through New Cubbington which then follows through to Hatton Park, and the 67 bus to Leamington runs close by Telford School.

== Geography ==
Pingle Brook, which flows south-westwards through the village, is a 1.4 miles (2.3 km) long tributary of the River Leam. It is normally mostly invisible within the village due to the sheltered nature of its course and its size. Heavy rains in July 2007 caused the brook to burst its banks, flooding streets in the village with over two feet of water, and the event was reported in the local and national press and television networks. South Cubbington Wood and North Cubbington Wood are ancient woods in the parish, outside the village.

== Churches ==
The Church of England parish church of Saint Mary has a documented chronology of vicars dating from 1346. The church was originally a chapelry of Leek Wootton and was granted to St Mary's Abbey at the priory's foundation by Geoffrey de Clinton in 1122. By 1331 it had become a separate parish and was appropriated by the monastery; a vicarage with house, mortuaries, altarage and small tithes being granted in 1345. The building of the present church was probably started by the Augustinians canons at Kenilworth in the early 12th century and when finished consisted of the nave, chancel, south aisle and western tower. The parish magazine is called Contact and is distributed throughout Cubbington and New Cubbington.

Jane Austen's brother James was vicar of Saint Mary's between 1792 and 1820, but never visited Cubbington as he lived in Hampshire where he was vicar of Steventon and another parish, where he took services every Sunday. Because of the distance between Hampshire and Warwickshire, he employed a curate to perform the vicar's duties at Cubbington. Cubbington has a Methodist church. The original Wesleyan chapel had been outgrown by 1843. A second was in use between 1844 and 1888, which was the year when the present building was erected. A church hall was added in 1965.

== Education ==
The earliest known record of a school in Cubbington is from 1780, on a different site from any of the schools now in existence. The first buildings on the site of the present Cubbington School were erected in 1846. Extensions to the school were made in 1893 and the 1960s. Our Lady and St Teresa's School was opened in 1961 on a site overlooking much of the surrounding countryside. Telford School in nearby Lillington is also attended by children from Cubbington. Secondary education is provided by North Leamington Community School and Arts College just under 2 miles (3.2 km) from the village. There is an equestrian school on the edge of the village, near the allotments.

== Transport ==
Cubbington is served by several bus routes with destinations to Birdingbury, Hatton Park, Kenilworth, Leamington Spa, Lillington, Stratford upon Avon and Warwick via several parts of the village. The nearest railway station is in Leamington Spa about 2.5 miles (4 km) south-west of the village. In 2010 the Department for Transport announced that the proposed High Speed 2 railway would pass the northern edge of the village in a 66 feet (20 m) wide, 1.2 miles (2 km) long railway cutting. In January 2011 The Tree Register of the British Isles identified a wild pear tree (the Cubbington Pear Tree) in the parish near Cubbington Woods as the largest on record in Britain. The tree was estimated to be 200–250 years old, which may have made it the oldest in Britain. It was in the path of the proposed HS2 route and was felled on 20 October 2020.

== Economy ==
Local employers include Thwaites since 1937, a manufacturer of dumper trucks that are sold throughout the United Kingdom and across Europe, and the Warwickshire Beer Company which was founded in 1998 in the former village bakery.

== Activities and sport ==
The original Cubbington Silver Band was formed in 1900, before disbanding in 1965, having played events such as Kenilworth Carnival. The current iteration of Cubbington Silver Band was re-formed in 1995, as a result of an idea by Ken Lindop, who was then the vicar of St Mary's parish church, and plays all around Warwickshire, and the Midlands.

In March 2007, the band won the 4th Section of the Midland Area Brass Band Championships. This resulted in qualification for the National Brass Band Championship of Great Britain, in Harrogate, where the band represented the Midlands Area and finished 13th. In March 2009 the band won the Midlands Area again, this time as 3rd Section Champions, and another trip to Harrogate to compete against the other top bands in the country resulted in the band finishing in 3rd place. The band won the 2015 4th Section Midland Area Brass Band Championships and again competed at the National Finals (which has since moved to Cheltenham) in September 2015, finishing in 17th place. In March 2026 the band were again 4th Section Midlands Area Champions, qualifying for the National Finals, taking place in York, September 2026.

The village hall is used for various projects including the Cubbington OAP group, and performances by the Cubbington Players, an amateur dramatic group. Behind the Victorian Methodist church is a large hall which is also used for groups including Cub Scouts and Beaver Scouts, a youth club, a ladies' fellowship and a small Junior Church.

== Popular culture ==
The village was used for some scenes in the BBC Television comedy series Keeping Up Appearances starring Patricia Routledge and Clive Swift. The children's television programme ChuckleVision has also filmed scenes in the village.

== Sources ==
- Peppitt, G.F. (1971). Cubbington. Kenilworth: The Pleasaunce Press. ISBN 0-902372-03-3.
- Pevsner, Nikolaus; Wedgwood, Alexandra (1966). Warwickshire. The Buildings of England. Harmondsworth: Penguin Books. p. 284.
- Salzman, L.F., ed. (1951). A History of the County of Warwick, Volume 6: Knightlow hundred. Victoria County History. pp. 74–78.
- Warwickshire Federation of Women's Institutes (1993). Warwickshire Within Living Memory. Newbury: Countryside Books. p. not cited. ISBN 1-85306-252-9.
