= Drovers' road =

Route for driving livestock on foot

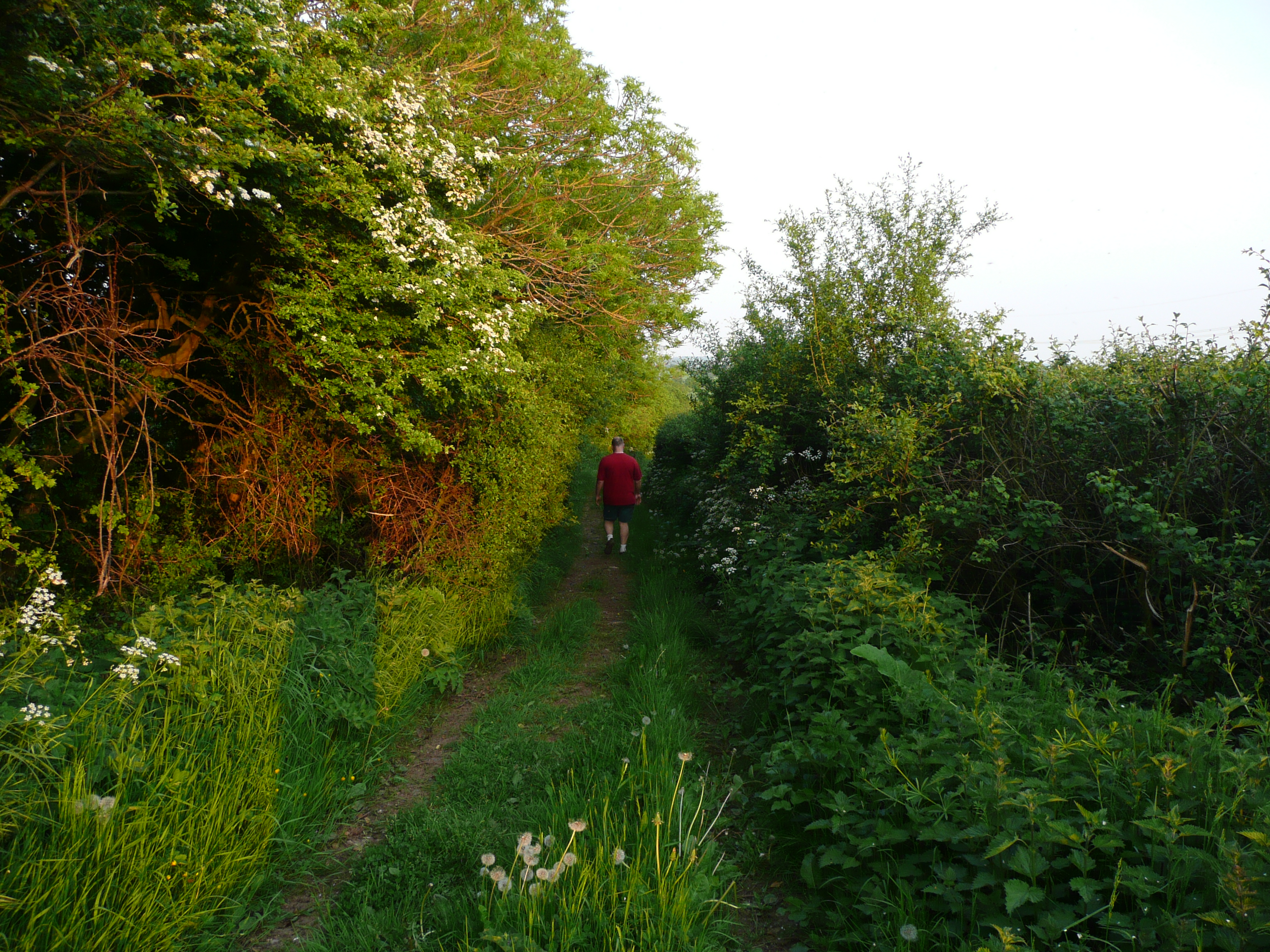
Drover's Road near Latteridge, South Gloucestershire, England.

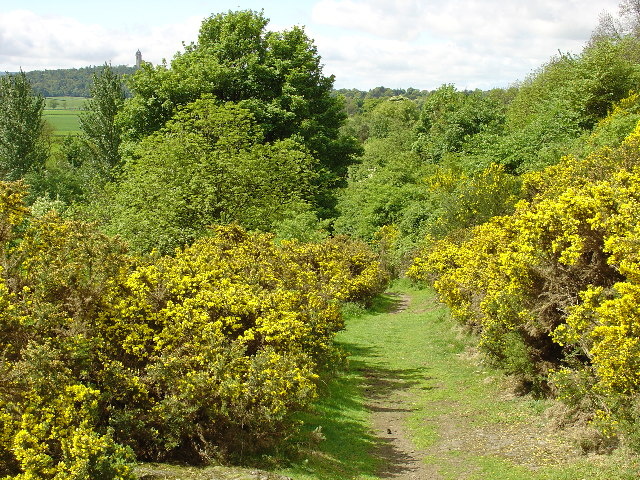
A section of drover's road at Cotkerse near Blairlogie, Scotland

A drovers' road, drove road, droveway, or simply a drove, is a route for droving livestock on foot from one place to another, such as to market or between summer and winter pasture (see transhumance). Many drovers' roads were ancient routes of unknown age; others are known to date back to medieval or more recent times.

== Description ==
Drovers' roads are often wider than other roads, able to accommodate large herds or flocks. Packhorse ways were quite narrow as the horses moved in single file, whereas drove roads were at least 40 feet (12 m) and up to 90 feet (27 m) wide. In the United Kingdom, where many original drovers' roads have been converted into single carriageway metalled roads, unusually wide verges often give an indication of the road's origin. In Wales, the start of many droveways, drovers' roads are often recognisable by being deeply set into the countryside, with high earth walls or hedges. The most characteristic feature of these roads is the occasional sharp turn in the road, which provided cover for animals and men in severe rain or snow. Some drovers' roads crossed mountains.

It is likely that the so-called Roman Steps in the Rhinogydd in Wales is an example of a drove road.

== Drovers ==
Drovers (those droving or driving livestock) accompanied their livestock either on foot or on horseback, travelling substantial distances. Rural England, Wales and Scotland are crossed by numerous drove roads that were used for this trade, many of which are now no more than tracks, and some lost altogether. The word "drover" (porthmon in Welsh) is used for those engaged in long-distance trade – distances which could cover much of the length of Britain or other world regions where droving was used – while "cattle driver" was used for those taking cattle to local markets.

Drovers used dogs to help control the stock, and these would sometimes be sent home alone after a drove, retracing their outward route and being fed at inns or farms the drove had 'stanced' at; the drover would pay for their food on his next journey.

A newspaper reported that the dogs mostly used in London for droving to the outlying butcheries and depots were principally collies, but in this show were a few of the old English bob-tailed animals seldom seen in London except on show, and not so often seen in the country as was the case thirty or forty years ago.

Controlling herds of three or four hundred animals on narrow roads, keeping them healthy, and feeding them en route over several weeks or months required expertise and authority. There was licensing under legislation introduced in 1563 intended to control "badgers" of grain and drovers of cattle, although it seems to have been less rigorously applied to drovers.

Whereas several Persons have of late used and carried on the Business of a Drover of Cattle, and of a common Badge Carrier, Buyer and Seller of Com and Grain, butter and Cheese, within the County Palatine, of Durham, without, being thereunto licenced according to the Statute in that Behalf made and provided: These are to give Notice, that every Person offending against the said Act of Parliament, forfeits the Sum of Five Founds for every Offence, and that if any Person shall from hence- forth presume to use or carry on the said Business of a Drover or Badger, within the said County of Durham, without a proper Licence, he will be prosecuted according to Law.

— Newcastle Courant

Drovers' dogs were also licensed.

DOG LICENCE DUTY The CHANCELLOR of the EXCHEQUER. In reply to Mr. Mark Stewart, said that the present exemption from dog licence duty in favour shepherds' and farmers' dogs applied only to dogs exclusively employed and kept on farms. He could not extend the exemption to cattle and sheep drovers’ and cattle and sheep drovers and cattle dealers' dogs. — Londonderry Sentinel

They were also exempted from the Disarming Acts of 1716 and 1748, which were passed after Jacobite risings. They were not necessarily literate but were respected as experts in their trade.

== Early history ==
Some form of drovers' roads existed in Romano-British times and certainly throughout the Early Middle Ages. For example, the old east–west drovers' road connecting the Dorset/Exeter region with London and thence Suffolk is along a similar alignment to the Roman road of the same route. Many lengths of the Welsh Road through the English Midlands coincide with manorial or parish boundaries, suggesting that it predates them and probably had pre-Roman origins as an ancient trackway.

== Medieval drovers' roads ==
In Great Britain, Drove as a placename can be traced to the early 13th century, and there are records of cattle driven from Wales to London and sheep from Lincolnshire to York in the early 14th century. Drovers from Scotland were licensed in 1359 to drive stock through England. These may be simply the earliest records of a more ancient trade. There is increasing evidence for large-scale cattle-rearing in Bronze Age and Iron Age Britain. Cattle and sheep were part of the Romano-British economy. By the Anglo-Saxon period there was long-distance movement of cattle, including stolen stock.

What is certain is that during the medieval period there was a substantial trade in cattle out of Wales into England, to which cattle from Ireland were added. These were driven across Somerset, Wiltshire and Berkshire to feed the growing population of London. The drovers made use of ancient ridgeways, including the Ridgeway over the Berkshire Downs, and ridgeways still known as the Old Shaftesbury Drove and the Ox Drove leading from Shaftesbury and Blandford to Salisbury.

Medieval drovers' roads were wide by medieval standards, 20 metres across, with wide grazing verges on either side, the "long acre".

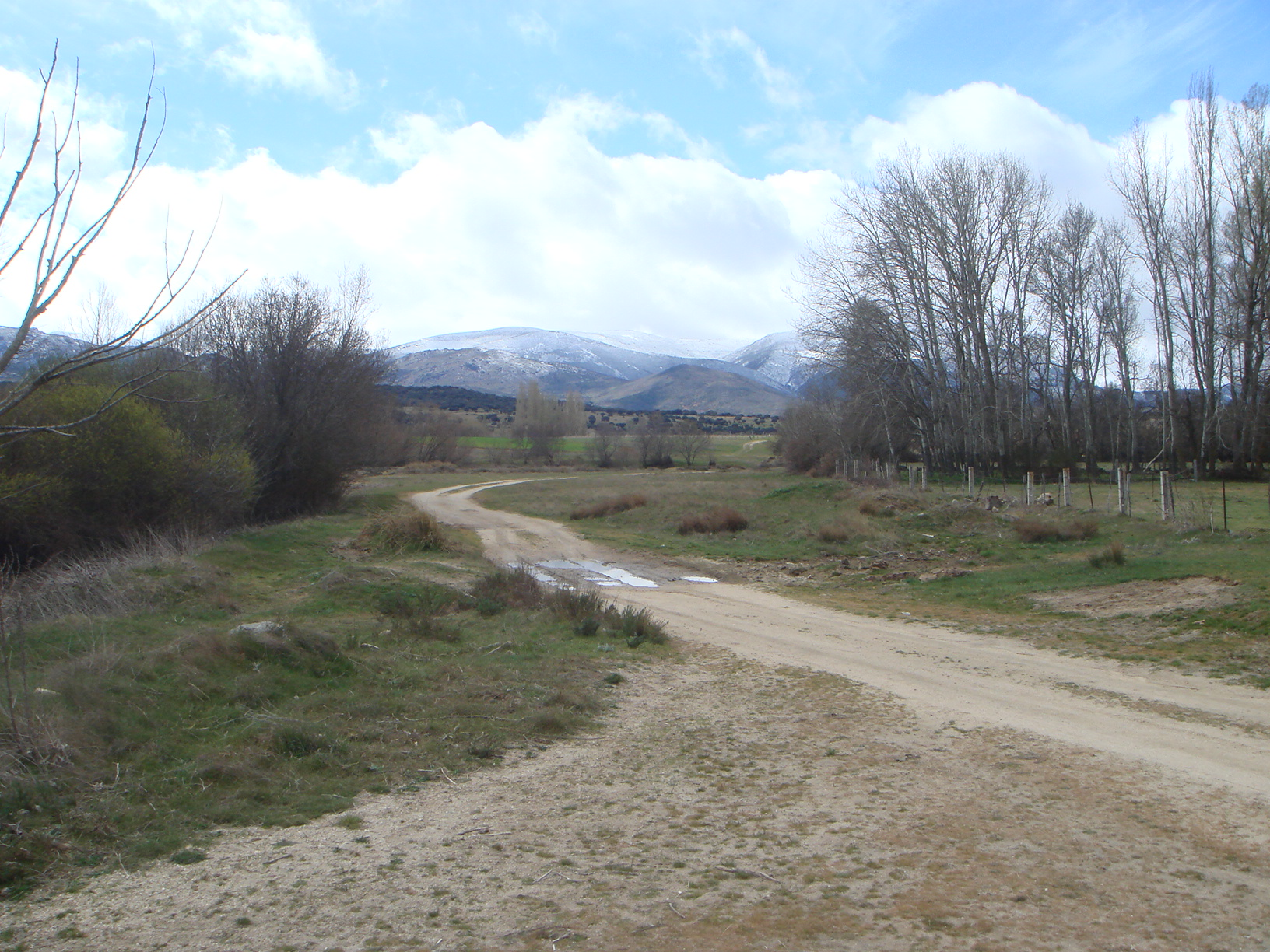
Cañada Real Leonesa Occidental in Province of Ávila, Spain

In medieval Spain the existence of migratory flocks on the largest scale, which were carefully organised through the system of the Mesta, gave rise to orderly drovers' roads, called cabañeras in Aragon, carreradas in Catalonia, azadores reales, emphasising royal patronage, in Valencia, and most famous of all, cañadas, including three major cañadas reales, in Castile. Along these grazing trackways, sheep travelled for distances of 350 to 450 miles (560 to 725 km), to the summer pasturages of the north, around León, Soria, Cuenca and Segovia, from the middle of April, and returning to winter pasturage in La Mancha, Extremadura, Alcántara and the lowlands of Andalusia.

In Languedoc the transhumance pathways, more restricted by agriculture and orchards and less organized than those of Iberia, were the drailles that fed into the main carraïres, which led from coastal plains to summer mountain pastures. They are documented from the 13th century and were organised in the 16th century by Statuts de la transhumance. In some areas, such as on Mont Lozère, the drailles were marked by montjoies (standing stones).

In the Kingdom of Naples, patterns of transhumance established in late antiquity were codified by Frederick II Hohenstaufen, but the arrival of rulers of Aragon in the 15th century saw the organisation of sheepways, tratturi delle pecore on the Aragonese model, and pastoralists were given privileges and restrictions, collectively termed the dogana, that were reminiscent of those of the Mesta. This established drovers' roads that continued without substantial change into the age of the railway.

== 17th century onwards ==
By the 17th century Daniel Defoe described Smithfield, in London, as the greatest meat market in the world. In 1855 it was moved to the outskirts of the city, to a site known as the Caledonian Market on Caledonian Road, Islington, to avoid the problems of large numbers of stock being driven through the streets. Cattle were also driven to other major cities, to areas of intermediate grazing to be fattened for market, and to markets and fairs. Many of the greatest stock fairs, such as Tan Hill, Yarnbury and White Sheet in Wiltshire, were held on ancient sites to which cattle were driven for centuries, perhaps since prehistoric times.

Geese, turkeys, pigs, and horses and in some cases goats were also driven to markets. Large quantities were driven to London. Cattle were shod with iron shoes; geese could be driven through a pan of tar mixed with sawdust, grit or ground shells or fitted with pads to protect their feet. The feet of turkeys could be tarred and sanded. Daniel Defoe recorded that 150,000 turkeys were driven from East Anglia to London each year, the journey taking three months to complete. There is reported to be a record of a wager in 1740 on whether geese or turkeys would travel faster – the winner being the geese which could graze as they moved, while the turkeys had to stop to be fed.

Repeatedly, regulations were put in place to try to control outbreaks of cattle disease and these included the drovers' activities. Penalties of £50 or more could be imposed.

From the LONDON GAZETTE, July I . Extract of an Act passed the last Session of Parliament for preventing the Spreading of the Distemper amongst the Horned Cattle.

During one disease outbreak, drovers were no longer able to take their dogs into Ireland.

18. No dog accompanying a drover or of the description ordinarily used by drovers or persons in charge of cattle, sheep, or swine shall be brought into any part of Ireland by any person, if the last place on land from whence such dog shall have been brought shall be any part of Great Britain. 19. This order shall come into operation on the 25th day of January, 1866. — Welshman

The regularity of the Welsh trade across Wiltshire is proved by an inscription in Welsh on an old inn (now a private house) in Stockbridge, still visible in the twentieth century: Gwair tymherus porfa flasus (worthwhile grass and a pleasant pasture) and Cwrw da cwal cysurus (good beer and a comfortable shelter).

Much of the trade in cattle from Wales to London was done on letters of credit. In 1706 the law was changed specifically to prevent drovers escaping their debts by declaring themselves bankrupt. The trade promoted the development of banking systems in both London and Wales. David Jones, a farmer's son, came into contact with the drovers whilst employed at the King's Head in Llandovery and set up his own Black Ox Bank in Llandovery in 1799; the bank issued its own bank notes. The bank survived until 1909 when it was taken over by Lloyds Bank.

== Long acre ==
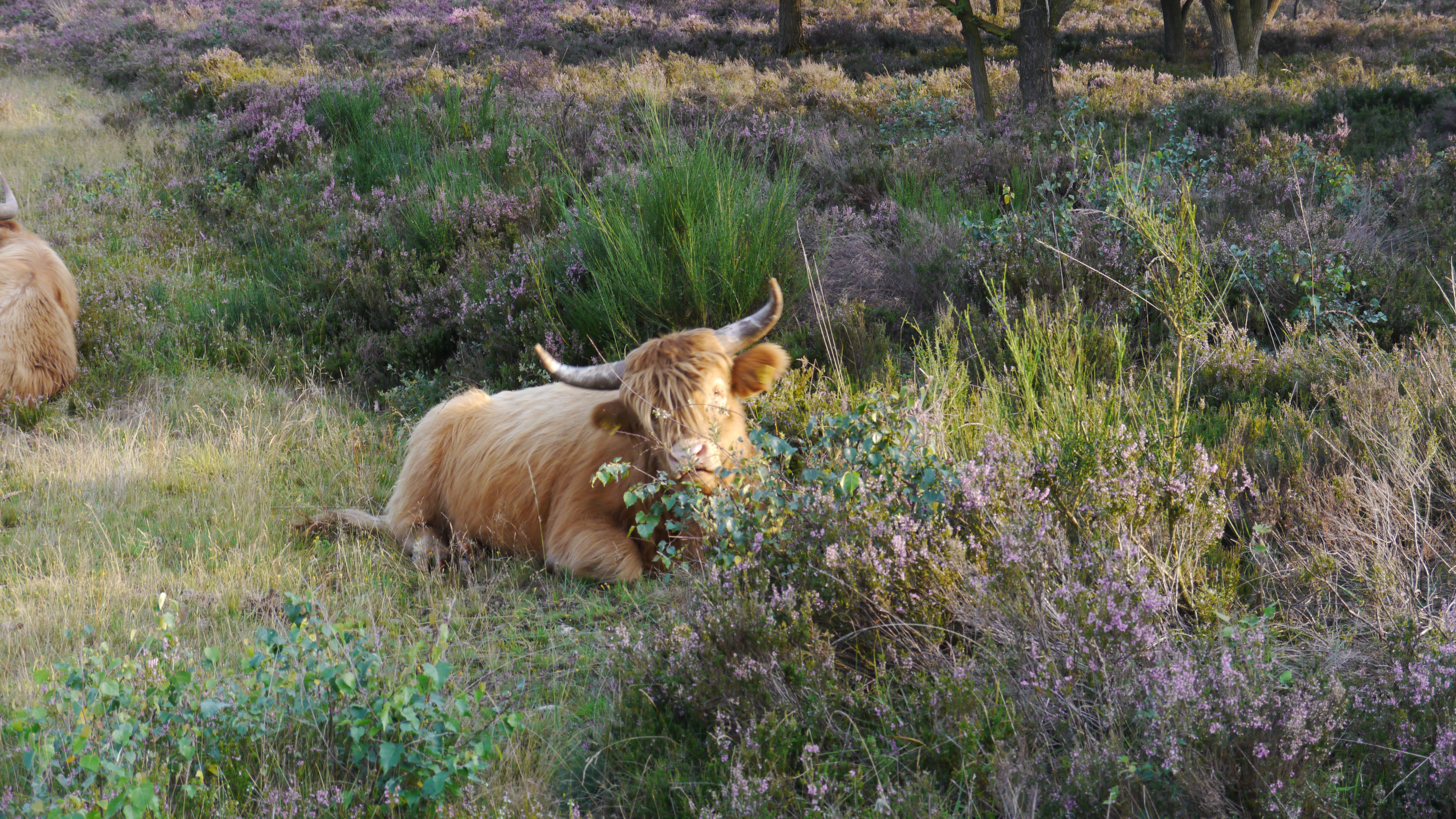
Cattle grazing on the long acre

The long acre is a traditional term for wide grassy road verges. In some places, such as Australia, New Zealand, and parts of the British Isles, rural roads are often separated from adjoining paddocks and fields by both a hedge or fence and a wide grass verge. Rather than leaving this verge fallow, farmers often tether livestock on it to use pasture feed (in the form of the grass) that would otherwise be wasted. Historically, the long acre was also grazed by herds or flocks moving from place to place, either on long journeys, or from one small local field to another. The long acre provided an important resource for such flocks and herds, perhaps forming a significant part of a small farmer's pasture. In Australia, the most common method of keeping grazing stock off a road is by the use of a portable electric fence, visible to the stock and to passing travellers as a single white tape. The use of the long acre as pasture has sometimes become formalised. For example, in parts of England, some have been registered as common land. In some cases the herbage of the drove was rented out to local farmers for grazing.

The related term long paddock is occasionally encountered in Australia with the same meaning, although the term also has a more specific historical meaning, relating to the cross-country droving of cattle between Queensland and New South Wales along what is now the route of the Cobb Highway.

== Drover's House ==
Whilst drovers often slept in the open, there were pubs that catered for the needs of drovers and their stock. One such was the Tydd Gote Inn, advertised as a Drover's House.

ALL that old-accustomed and well-established DROVER'S HOUSE, called Tydd Gote Inn, with the Barn, Stable, Granary, and other Out-houses, Yard, Garden, and several Closes of rich Grass Land thereto belonging, containing Twenty Acres (more or less), situated in Tydd St Giles, the Isle of Ely, adjoining the turnpike-road from Long Sutton to Wisbech.

== Decline of droving ==
Droving declined during the nineteenth century, through a combination of agricultural change, the introduction of railway transport from the 1840s, cattle disease, and more intensive use of the countryside through which the stock had passed for hundreds of years. For example, importation of cattle from Donaghadee in Ireland to Portpatrick, which would then be driven through Wigtownshire, had reached 20,000 per year in 1812, but fell to 1,080 in 1832, because they came by steamer directly to ports at Liverpool and Glasgow instead.

As the use of driveways declined and rights of way and responsibility for maintenance were disputed, evidence of usage by drivers could be given in court, as happened in Wisbech St Mary, Isle of Ely in 1843.

Drovers' rights to occupy a stance and pasture their cattle was also being challenged.

DROVE STANCES. THE MARQUIS OF BREADALBANE V MACGREGOR AND OTHERS. Judgment was given on this appeal by the House of Lords on Thursday last. It will seen that the decision of their Lordships is contrary to that of the Court of Session. They held that right of the respondents to the drove-stances could not be sustained, and therefore the interlocutor must be remitted, and the case on the other points sent back to the Court of Session. The question before their Lordships were two in number- first, as to the form, whether the appeal was competent; and, secondly as to the merits, whether the respondents, owners and drovers of cattle and sheep, had a right to stance - a place for resting and feeding their cattle on their way from the north and west Highlands to the south -on the lands of Inverouran and Inverruach, in the parish of Glenorchy, of which the appellant was the proprietor. The Chancellor, in moving judgment, held that the appeal was competent. On the chief question, he observed — It was contended, in the argument for the respondents, that the stances were indispensably necessary to the convenient travelling of the cattle; and that without them the drove roads - of which he would not give any opinion, as there was no question raised as to the right of way in the appeal - would be useless. But the stances themselves were claimed as of right. The respondents, in their pleadings, say certain places for resting and refreshing sheep and cattle on their journey are, indispensable; these, places are situated at average distances of 10 miles from each other, and are invariable and indispensable accompaniments to the drove roads And the Court in its interlocutor "finds that there are relative averments fit to be the subject of a jury trial" But the right claimed appeared to nothing less than a right to pasture the cattle certain distances in the drove-roads on other men's lands, without payment and without con sent or agreement. There was no principle which could be referred to as supporting such a right. There be no principle authorising the depasturing of cattle upon another man's land, in respect right of passing over a road which ran through that, land. Under these circumstances, the interlocutor of the Court that the averments were relevant— in other words, that such a claim might be supported as a legal claim - appeared to his lordship to be erroneous; and he moved that that interlocutor should be discharged, and the case remitted to the Court of Session to take such course as should be proper with respect thereto. Lord Brougham agreed with the Lord Chancellor. Lord Campbell said, the public might have passage over a road, but not the right of having their cattle fed in the course of the passage. In a case of this kind in England, if the owner of fields lying by the side of the road brought an action of trespass because the cattle ate the herbage at the sides of the road, the only defence would be that of excuse, because the drover could not prevent them, but it would be no defence that the drover had a right to allow them take it; still less that the owner of adjoining fields was to bound furnish places where the cattle might rest and feed on the way. If there was an abuse of the rights of property in refusing maintain these stances, as the respondents seemed to think the proper remedy was not by appeal to the courts of law, which could only administer existing rights, but to the Legislature, which had the authority create new rights. Inverness Courier

The last recorded large-scale cattle drove across Wales was in 1870, and of sheep in 1900, although droving was briefly resumed during the rail strike of 1912. In Scotland, the last drove over the Corrieyairack Pass is believed to have taken place in 1906. Corrieyairack Pass had also been used by droves of cattle and sheep from the Isle of Skye; the last drove from Skye to use the pass occurred "in the closing years of the 19th century".

An example of regular annual sheep droving is described as taking place "a short time before the [First World] war" in England between Dorset and Hertfordshire.

When cattle were moved by rail by the North-East railway company, initially the drovers accompanied the stock on the goods train; later, they were required to use the passenger trains.

Despite the decline in droving, the annual Drovers' Tea in Norwich in 1906 organised by the RSPCA catered for 570.

Drovers and other road users could come into conflict. In 1916 a new order compelled farmers and drovers of cattle, sheep, et cetera, to carry lamps at the front and rear of herds or flocks, such lamps "to be visible for a reasonable distance", and swung to and fro on the approach of any vehicle to indicate the presence of an obstruction on the road.

== North America and South America ==
Cattle drives in North America by American cowboys and South American cattle drivers are similar in nature, although distances were often greater; like most routes they started out by following a general geographic route before becoming roadways. They were a major economic activity in the 19th and early 20th century. Particularly common in the western states, such as Texas, Kansas, Louisiana. The peak period for cattle driving was between 1850s and 1910s. In this period, about 27 million cattle were moved during that time. The riders covered long distances. Both riders and stock animals were in need of rest, this resulted in formation of "cow towns" across the frontier. The first of them were Abilene, Wichita and Dodge City.

== See also ==
- Causey Mounth
- Drover (Australian)
- Esker Riada
- Britain's Lost Routes with Griff Rhys Jones
- Slíghe Chualann
- Stock routes – roads specified for stock movement in Australia
- Overlanding
