= A2216 road =

Road in southeast London

Coordinates: 51.4470°N 0.0724°W

A2216

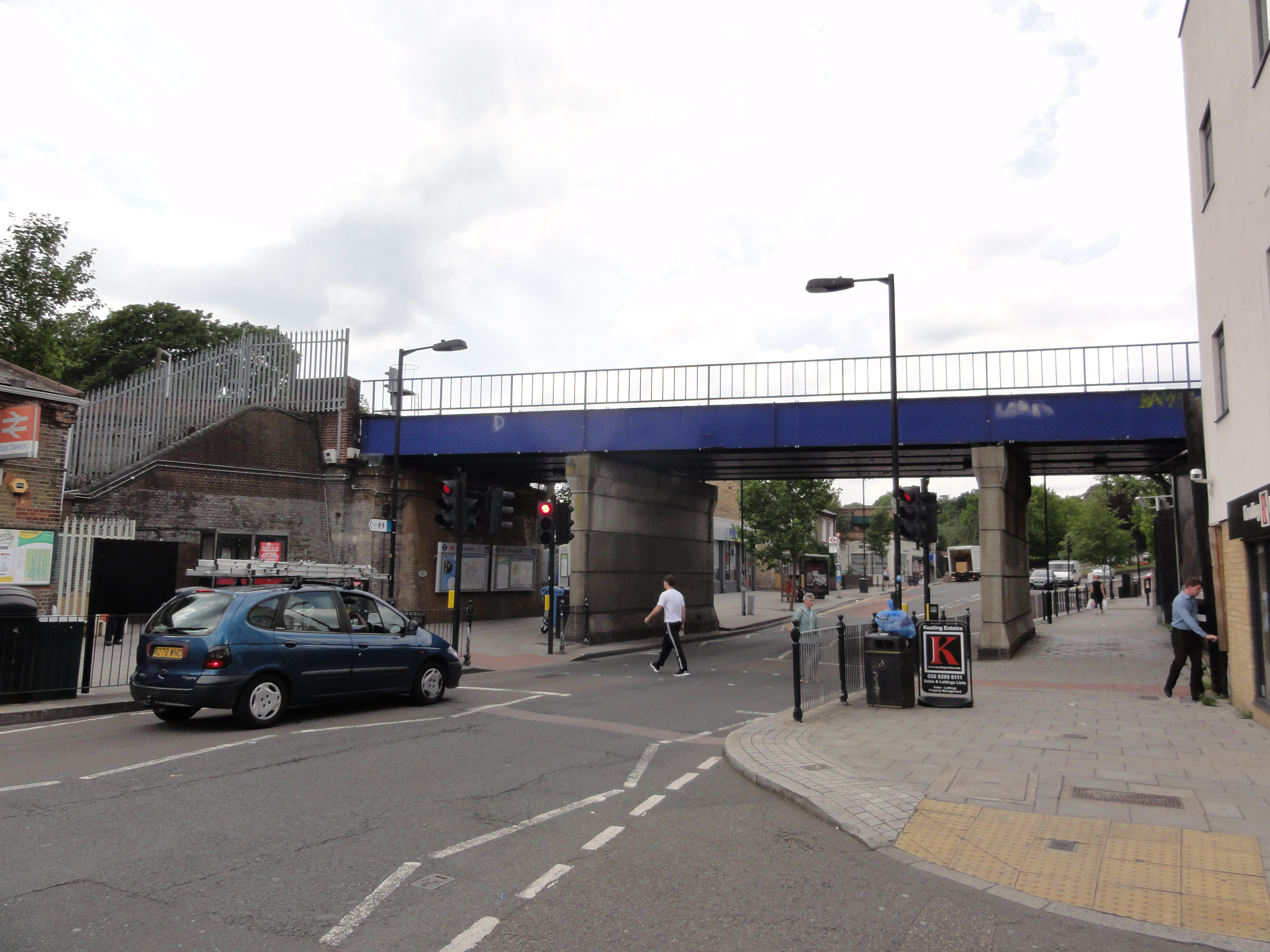
- East Dulwich Station on Grove Vale (A2216)

Route information
- Length: 4.0 mi (6.4 km)

Major junctions
- North end: Denmark Hill
- A215 A2214 A205 A212
- South end: Sydenham

Location
- Country: United Kingdom
- Constituent country: England
- Primary destinations: Denmark Hill, East Dulwich, Forest Hill, Sydenham

Road network
- Roads in the United Kingdom; Motorways; A and B road zones
← A2215	→ A2217

The A2216 is an A road in south London, England suburbia. It runs from the A215 in Denmark Hill to the A212 in Sydenham. Part of the road is an ancient thoroughfare, Lordship Lane. In Dulwich, the road runs via the A205 South Circular Road.

== Route ==
=== Denmark Hill ===
The road begins at traffic lights on the A215 Denmark Hill, opposite Ruskin Park and King's College Hospital. It heads west as Champion Park, parallel to the railway line (South London Line and Catford Loop) passing Denmark Hill Station, before turning south onto Grove Lane, to pass a parade of shops. The road meets Champion Hill/Grove Hill Road, where it becomes a dual carriageway named Dog Kennel Hill. It rattles quickly down a steepish slope, with fairly handsome 1930s-era council flats. On the west side is Sainsbury's Dulwich and Champion Hill, the home ground of Dulwich Hamlet Football Club. Dog Kennel Hill passes St. Francis Park to the west, before suddenly becoming single-carriageway, to pass under the Sutton and Mole Valley Line. As a result, we pass East Dulwich Station and the name changes to Grove Vale.

=== East Dulwich ===
Here we enter East Dulwich, and pass some shops, before arriving at a roundabout with Goose Green to the east. We continue straight onto the ancient thoroughfare – Lordship Lane. The A2214 runs concurrent with us until it turns right along what looks like a nondescript side-street named East Dulwich Grove. The A2216 follows 1.3 miles (2.1 km) of Victorian suburbia, until it meets the A205 Dulwich Common, coming in from the west. Here, the South Circular Road turns to the right to become Lordship Lane. The A2216 and A205 run concurrent until Forest Hill. At Wood Vale, Lordship Lane becomes London Road, and at Sydenham Hill, the London Borough of Lewisham takes over from the London Borough of Southwark.

=== Forest Hill ===
At the end of London Road, in the centre of Forest Hill, the A205 and A2216 disperse. The A205 turns to the east, along Devonshire Road, whilst the A2216 turns to the west, along Dartmouth Road. Dartmouth Road runs parallel to the mainline out of Charing Cross Station. It meets a roundabout with Kirkdale, where it turns to the north. The road then meets another roundabout with the A212, which means the A2216 comes to an end.

== History ==
=== South Circular Road ===
The A2216 was, for a short while in the 1920s, the original number of this route, as the A205 was largely created using sections of existing roads.

=== Lordship Lane ===
==== Dulwich Library ====
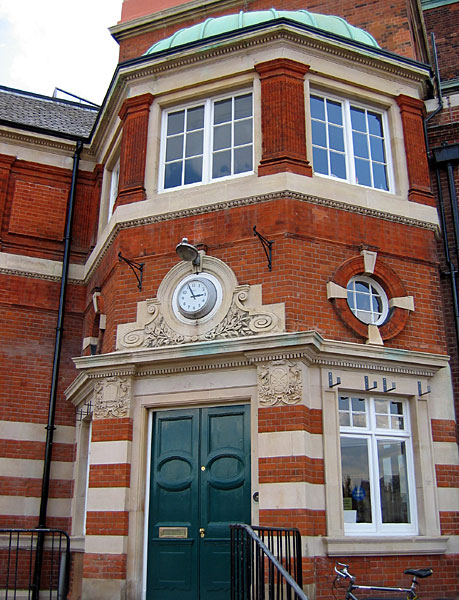
Dulwich Library.

==== Enid Blyton birthplace ====
The children's author, Enid Blyton was born on 11 August 1897 above a shop in Lordship Lane. A Southwark Blue Plaque was placed there in 2003 above 352 Lordship Lane – her birthplace.

==== The Concrete House – 549 Lordship Lane ====
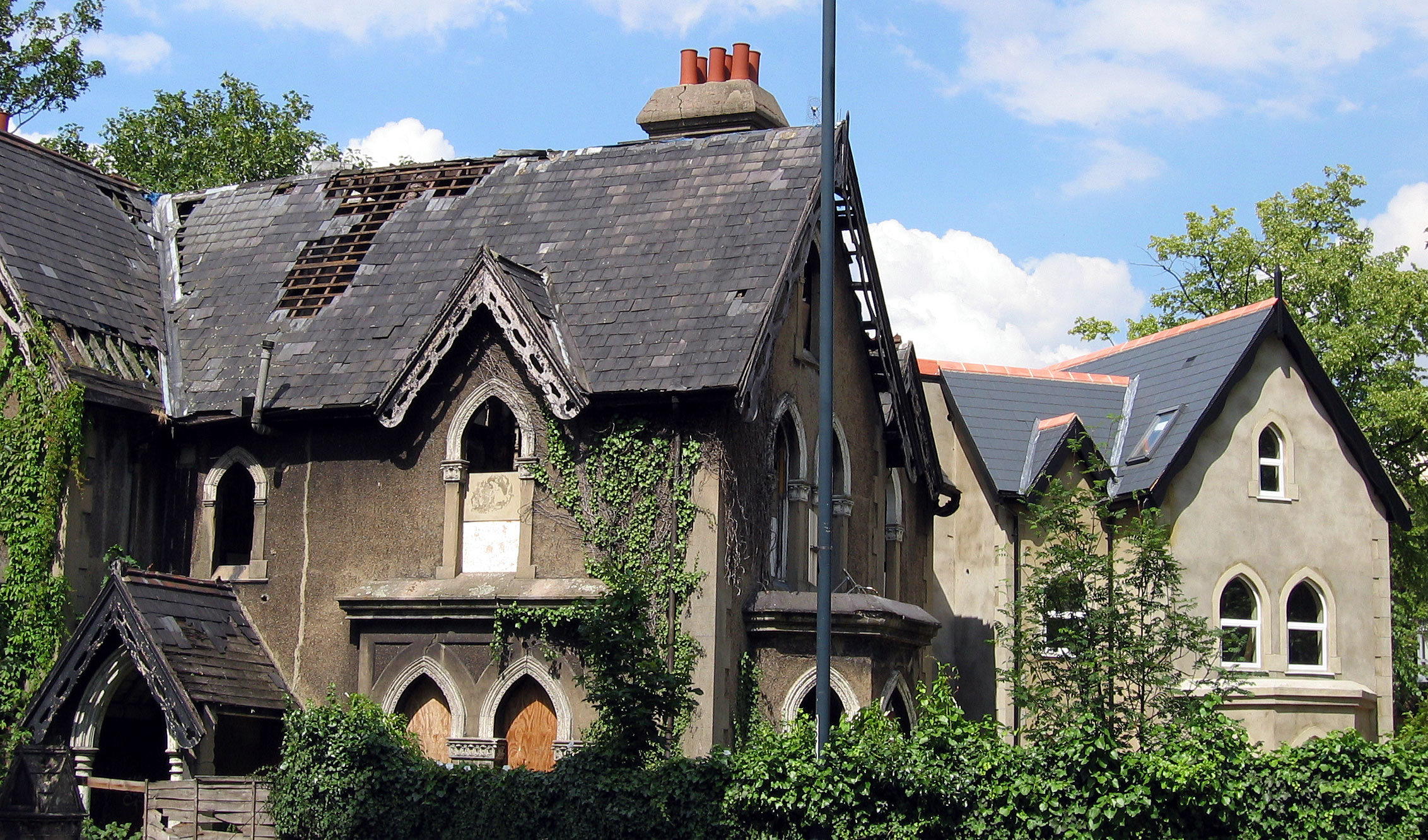
The derelict Concrete House on Lordship Lane, Southwark in 2005, with similar new building behind.

One of the most architecturally interesting buildings in the area is at 549 Lordship Lane. The so-called "Concrete House" grade II listed building and is an example of a 19th-century concrete house. It was built in 1873 by Charles Drake of the Patent Concrete Building Company. In 1867, the builder had patented the use of iron panels for shuttering rather than timber. It is listed on English Heritage's Buildings At Risk register. Southwark Council refused permission for its demolition.

Derelict for many years it has now been restored with the help of the Heritage of London Trust into 5 flats, to be managed by Hexagon Housing Association. The Duke of Gloucester opened the completed building on 13 June 2013.

==== History of the lane ====
Lordship Lane is East Dulwich's oldest street. It is an ancient thoroughfare that significantly predates the late 19th century developments. The area was transformed from fields and market gardens to Victorian suburbs in the period 1865–1885. The tram line that once served Lordship Lane is long gone.

==== Lordship Lane station ====
Lordship Lane was a railway station in East Dulwich, in what was the Metropolitan Borough of Camberwell in south London, on the Crystal Palace and South London Junction Railway. It was opened by the London, Chatham and Dover Railway (LCDR) in September 1865 and took its name from Lordship Lane, the thoroughfare on which it stood. It was situated a short distance from a rival London, Brighton and South Coast Railway (LBSCR) station named Forest Hill, which survives.

===== Further reading =====
- Crystal Palace (High Level) and Catford Loop by V Mitchell & K Smith, Middleton Press, 1991.
- The Railway through Sydenham Hill Wood, From the Nun's Head to the Screaming Alice by Mathew Frith, The Friends of the Great North Wood and London Wildlife Trust leaflet 1995.
- London's Local Railways by A A Jackson, David & Charles, 1978
- The Crystal Palace (High Level) Branch by W Smith, British Railway Journal 28, 1989.
