= A212 road =

Road in London, England

A212

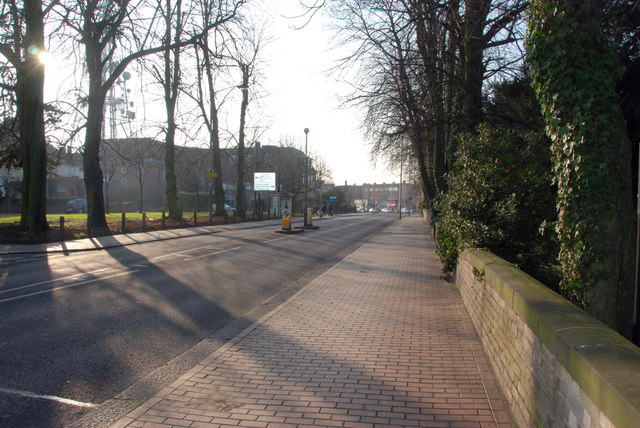
- The A212 at South Norwood, near Crystal Palace

Major junctions
- South East end: Catford
- A205 A2218 A213 A2216 A234 A2199 A214 A215 A213 A222 A232 A2022
- North West end: Forestdale

Location
- Country: United Kingdom
- Constituent country: England
- Primary destinations: Croydon

Road network
- Roads in the United Kingdom; Motorways; A and B road zones
← A211	→ A213

The A212 is an A road in South London, linking Lewisham to Croydon.

== Route ==
It runs southwest from the South Circular at Catford, going through Sydenham, Norwood and Crystal Palace before heading south to Croydon. It then turns east to terminate at the A2022 road in Forestdale.

== Vicar's Oak ==
The junction with the A214 at Crystal Palace is the meeting point of four London Boroughs – London Borough of Bromley, London Borough of Croydon, London Borough of Lambeth and London Borough of Southwark. The Vicar's Oak, a tree which stood here from the 16th century was once the traditional marker of this boundary.
