= A roads in Zone 2 of the Great Britain numbering scheme =

The numbering zones for A-roads in Great Britain

List of A roads in zone 2 in Great Britain starting south of the River Thames and east of the A3 (roads beginning with 2).

== Single- and double-digit roads ==
| Road | From | To | Notes |
|---|---|---|---|
| A2 | A3 at The Borough, Central London | A20 at Dover | The section between Three Crutches (east of Gravesend) and Brenley Corner (near Faversham) has mostly been replaced by the M2 Motorway for long-distance traffic |
| A20 | A2 at New Cross, South East London | A2 at Dover | |
| A21 | A20 at Lewisham, South East London | A259 at Hastings | The section from Badgers Mount (south east of Croydon) to Chipstead (north west of Sevenoaks) has mostly been replaced by the M25 Motorway to complete the belt around London. |
| A22 | A23 at Purley | A2280 & A2290 at Eastbourne | |
| A23 | A203 at County Hall, Central London | A259 at Brighton | Formerly included part of Westminster Bridge Road (now part of A302). |
| A24 | A3 at Clapham | A259 at Worthing | |
| A25 | A20 at Wrotham Heath, Sevenoaks, Borough Green | A3 at Guildford | |
| A26 | A20 at Maidstone | A259 at Newhaven | |
| A27 | A259 at Pevensey | A36 at Whiteparish | |
| A28 | A254 at Margate | A21 at Baldslow | |
| A29 | A24 at Capel | B2259 & B2166 at Bognor Regis | |

== Triple-digit roads ==
| Road | From | To | Notes |
|---|---|---|---|
| A200 | London Bridge | Greenwich | |
| A201 | King's Cross, Central London | Bricklayers Arms, Central London | Part of the London Inner Ring Road |
| A202 | Victoria Station, Central London | New Cross Gate, South East London | Part of the London Inner Ring Road where it crosses the Thames at Vauxhall Bridge. |
| A203 | Vauxhall | Brixton | |
| A204 | Brixton | Tulse Hill | |
| A205 | Woolwich | Chiswick | London's South Circular Road. The section from Woolwich to Clapham is former A208, A212, A2212, B226, A2216 and B228. The western end was originally at Holland Park, this section (former B308, A3206, B310, B315 and B407) was renumbered to A3220 in the late 1950s and the A205 was rerouted to Chiswick along former A3, A305, B356, A307 and A315 to form a continuous North and South Circular Road. |
| A206 | Greenwich | Greenhithe | |
| A207 | Charlton | Dartford | The section of the A207 east of Welling Way is the former A2 before it was bypassed to the south. |
| A208 | Eltham | Orpington | |
| A209 | Plumstead | Falconwood | |
| A210 | Eltham | Blendon | |
| A211 | Eltham | Ruxley | |
| A212 | Catford | Forestdale | |
| A213 | Sydenham | Broad Green | |
| A214 | Wandsworth | West Wickham | |
| A215 | Elephant and Castle | Shirley | |
| A216 | Streatham | Mitcham | |
| A217 | Fulham | Horley | |
| A218 | Wandsworth | South Wimbledon | |
| A219 | Harlesden | South Wimbledon | |
| A220 | Erith | Bexleyheath | |
| A221 | Bexleyheath | Albany Park | |
| A222 | Croydon | Old Bexley | |
| A223 | Foots Cray | Crayford | |
| A224 | Foots Cray | Sevenoaks | Previously terminated at a junction with the then A21 at Badgers Mount, south of Orpington; extended to Sevenoaks along the route of the old A21 and A2028. |
| A225 | Dartford | Sevenoaks | |
| A226 | Crayford | Rochester, Gravesend | |
| A227 | Gravesend | Shipbourne, Tonbridge | |
| A228 | Tunbridge Wells | Lower Stoke | Maidstone |
| A229 | Rochester | Hurst Green | Originally followed what is now the B2097 in Chatham. Originally ended in Baldslow. Truncated to Sedlescombe when the A21 was rerouted, and rerouted to its current route in the 1990s; the old route is now the B2244. |
| A230 | Horsted | Chatham | A230 in Sussex is not listed so may have been superseded by the A275 |
| A231 | Chatham | Chatham | |
| A232 | Ewell | Orpington | |
| A233 | Bromley Common | Westerham | |
| A234 | Crystal Palace | Beckenham | |
| A235 | Purley | Thornton Heath Pond | In two sections north and south of Croydon town centre, the middle part having formed the main shopping street of Croydon (North End), which is now pedestrianised. |
| A236 | South Croydon | Mitcham | |
| A237 | Mitcham Common | Coulsdon | |
| A238 | Kingston upon Thames | Colliers Wood | The section between Lower Downs Road and Raynes Park Railway Station has a designated cycle lane |
| A239 | Morden Park | Mitcham Common | Originally assigned to the Kingston upon Thames bypass but when construction began, this became the A3 instead, while the old route of the A3 became the A3063 (A239 was not used as it was out of zone); the southern section is now part of the A309. The current road was assigned as an upgrade to the B273, B274 and B275. |
| A240 | Burgh Heath | Kingston upon Thames | |
| A241 | Unused | | Was a road between Epsom and Banstead; downgraded to an extension of the B284 by 1985. |
| A242 | Reigate | Merstham | |
| A243 | Leatherhead | Surbiton | |
| A244 | Leatherhead | Hounslow | |
| A245 | Leatherhead | Horsell | |
| A246 | Leatherhead | Guildford | |
| A247 | Woking | Clandon Park | |
| A248 | Shere | Peasmarsh | |
| A249 | Maidstone | Sheerness | |
| A250 | Sheerness | Queenborough | |
| A251 | Faversham | Ashford | |
| A252 | Charing | Chilham | |
| A253 | Sarre | Ramsgate | |
| A254 | Margate | Ramsgate | Inland route via Westwood |
| A255 | Margate | Ramsgate | via Broadstairs |
| A256 | Whitfield | St Peter's | |
| A257 | Canterbury | Sandwich | |
| A258 | Dover | Sandwich | |
| A259 | Folkestone | Emsworth | Runs along the southern coastline for over 40 miles. |
| A260 | Barham | Folkestone | |
| A261 | Lympne | Hythe | |
| A262 | Tenterden | Lamberhurst | |
| A263 | Unused | | Was a road between Pembury and Royal Tunbridge Wells. Between 1974 and 1977, much of the route became part of an eastern extension of the A264 except the easternmost section (which became part of the A228) and the route through Tunbridge Wells was declassified. |
| A264 | Tunbridge Wells | Horsham | |
| A265 | Hurst Green | Heathfield | Significant portion is now B2102 and B2192 from Heathfield to Ringmer. Until the 1990s, continued to what is now the B2244 (then part of the A229) in Hawkhurst via what is now part of the A229. |
| A266 | Unused | | Was a road between Frant and Hurst Green. Downgraded to the B2099 between 1968 and 1972. |
| A267 | Tunbridge Wells | Lower Dicker | |
| A268 | Flimwell | Rye | Previously allocated to a road in Cross In Hand from A265 (now B2102) to A267. This became a spur of the A267 when the current A268 was created, and is now a spur of the B2102. For a short time continued west to the then A266 in Ticehurst. Originally followed what is now the B2088 in Four Oaks. |
| A269 | Bexhill | Ninfield | |
| A270 | Southwick | Coldean | Lewes Road. Formerly part of the A27 before a bypass was constructed around Brighton in the early 1990s. Original alignment went from Sidley Green to Glyne Gap, and was renumbered to A2036 by 1976 to discourage through traffic. |
| A271 | Hailsham | Battle | |
| A272 | Heathfield | Chilcomb | The road now takes a different route around Haywards Heath and not through the town as before (the old road is now the B2272). Original westerly end was at Stockbridge; this section became the B3049 when the road was rerouted along the middle section of the B3420. Originally followed what is now the B2102 to the then-A265 (now the B2192) in Blackboys; swapped routes when the A265 was downgraded west of the A267. |
| A273 | Haywards Heath | Pyecombe | Previously allocated to a road between Ringmer and Golden Cross; this was downgraded to the B2124 in the 1960s when the A265 was downgraded in the area. The road number was reused on the current route (an upgrade of part of the B2028 and B2036, though was later rerouted around Burgess Hill) around the same time. |
| A274 | Maidstone | Biddenden | Formerly the B2078 before it was upgraded to Class I status in the 1950s. Previously allocated to a road between Lewes and Pevensey. Renumbered as a portion of an eastern extension of the A27 in the early 1950s. The section east of Polegate was later downgraded to the B2247 and the remainder of that section declassified when the A27 was rerouted. |
| A275 | Forest Row | Lewes | Original southernmost end was at Newhaven; the road was truncated to Lewes when the A26 was extended to Newhaven; this is now the B2193 and unclassified Kingston Road, Piddinghoe Road, and Lewes Road. The road originally followed what is now the A2029 into Lewes. |
| A276 | Unused | | Originally proposed on Worthing to Newhaven; this became part of the A259 (and the B2109 from Newhaven to Eastbourne became the B259, but two years later became the A259) right before the numbering was finalized in 1922, and the number was instead used on the road from the A275 in to the A26 in Lewes that day. That road became part of the rerouted A275 after 1960, while the old route of the A275 became part of an extended A2029. |
| A277 | Lewes | | Lewes Town Road, connecting the A26 and the A27; formerly part of the A27. The original alignment went from Brighton to Portslade-by-Sea. Downgraded to the B2066 and B2194 in the 1970s. |
| A278 | Rainham | Bredhurst | Previously allocated to a road between Felbridge and Horsham. Renumbered as a western extension of the A264 in 1935; the route from Copthorne to Crawley is now the A2220 and the route to Horsham is now the B2195. |
| A279 | Unused | | Ran from the A281 south of Lower Beeding to Handcross. A spur (former A280) to the A281 was added in 1935. The A279 used to end at the A23 (now B2114) at the southern end of Handcross, but when Handcross High Street was bypassed, the A279 was extended along the old A23 to the bypass. Downgraded to an extension of the B2110 between 1993 and 1996, while the spur became part of an extended B2115. |
| A280 | Findon | Angmering | Originally allocated to a road cutting the corner between the then-A279 (now B2110) and the A281 in Lower Beeding. Became a spur of the A279 (now part of the B2115) in 1935 when the current A280 was created as an upgrade of part of the B2140. |
| A281 | Guildford | Pyecombe | Near Cranleigh the road used to head south on what is now the B2130, Stovolds Hill, a now-destroyed road, and Dunsfold Road to Alford, where it rejoined the modern route. The road was rerouted with the construction of Dunsfold Aerodrome during World War II. Previously followed Old Guildford Road in Broadbridge Heath, and West Street and East Street in Horsham. |
| A282 | Darenth | Thurrock | Dartford Crossing (includes Queen Elizabeth II Bridge and Dartford Tunnel), part of the London Orbital (M25). Previously allocated to a road between Broadbridge Heath and Five Oaks. Renumbered as an extension of the A264 between 1934 and 1936, probably as part of the 1935 renumbering. |
| A283 | Milford | Shoreham-by-Sea | |
| A284 | Houghton | Littlehampton | |
| A285 | Petworth | Chichester | May have been previously used in Charing from the A20 to the A252, but it was likely a typo as the number was already in use. Became part of the A252 in the early 1930s, although it could have been the A292 before that. |
| A286 | Milford | Birdham | |
| A287 | Hook | Haslemere | |
| A288 | Southsea | Portsmouth | |
| A289 | Strood | Gillingham | |
| A290 | Canterbury | Whitstable | |
| A291 | Sturry | Herne Bay | |
| A292 | Ashford | M20 at Willesborough, Kent | Previously allocated to Magazine Road in Ashford as an upgrade of the B2072. Later became part of the A28 (either as a spur or mainline), but is now unclassified. May have been used in Charing between the A20 and the A252 along the possible former A285 (also a typo), but was likely a typo for the A252. |
| A293 | Portslade Bypass and A27 junction. | Portslade | |
| A294 | Unused | | Ran between Chichester and Bognor Regis as an upgrade of the B2143. Renumbered as an extension of the A259 as part of the 1935 renumbering. |
| A295 | Hailsham | Amberstone, East Sussex | Previously allocated to a road between Dartford and Oxleas Wood (now A2 and Rochester Avenue; the old route of the A2 was partially declassified and the rest became part of the A207). |
| A296 | Dartford | Bean interchange, near Bluewater | Former route of the A2. Originally allocated to Watling Street from the A226 to the A2 (now the current A296). Extended east over the old route of the A2 in 1972 and rerouted along the current route in 1978. |
| A297 | Morden Hall Park, Merton | Rose Hill | Previously continued into Sutton and Belmont to meet the A217. Downgraded to B2230. |
| A298 | New Malden | East of Raynes Park | |
| A299 | Brenley Corner, near Faversham | Ramsgate | |

== Four-digit roads ==
| Road | From | To | Notes |
|---|---|---|---|
| A2000 | Crayford | Slade Green | |
| A2001 | Chislehurst Road, Sidcup | High Street, Sidcup | |
| A2002 | Deptford | Blackheath | Ran from A25 northeast to A217 in Reigate; this became part of the A25/A217 one way system when the Reigate Tunnel section was pedestrianised. |
| A2003 | Dorking | North Holmwood | Previously allocated to Mongers Lane in Ewell. Declassified in the 1930s when Ewell was bypassed. |
| A2004 | Crawley | A23 at Crawley | Previously allocated to Waterden Road from A246 to A322 in Guildford (now a spur of the A246). |
| A2005 | | | Ran from the A28 through the centre of Canterbury to the A28. Was originally planned to be assigned to the bypass, while the A28 was planned to go through the centre, but this was flipped when it was found that the bypass was more widely used. |
| A2006 | | | Ran from A253 (now High Street) to A255 (now King Street) in Ramsgate. Now part of the A255 due to pedestrianization in the center of Ramsgate. |
| A2007 | | | Ran from the then-A2 to the then-A259 in Dover via Priory Road. Renumbered A256 when Biggin Street was pedestrianized, but may have been a spur far earlier. |
| A2008 | | | Ran along Scanlons Bridge Road in Hythe, linking the A259 to the A261. Now part of the A259 one-way system, but it remains two-way to allow traffic to head west without going around the loop. |
| A2009 | | | Ran from A262 to A28 in High Halden, forming the third side of a triangle between the A262 and the A28. Became part of a rerouted A262, although the A2009 may have been a spur of the A262 before this. |
| A2010 | Seven Dials, Brighton | West Street, Brighton | |
| A2011 | M23 J10 | A23 at Crawley | The original one ran from the A3 south to Clarence Pier in Portsmouth (became part of the A288), and after this, ran from Ditton to Bearsted via Aylesford (now Station Road, Forstal Road, Sandling Lane, and Bearsted Road). |
| A2012 | Reserved | | Reserved in April 2004 for the Thames Gateway Crossing. First used from the A223 (now declassified High Street) to the A224 in Orpington; this became an extension of the A232 in the 1930s (probably in the 1935 renumbering). Next used from Leatherhead to Fetcham; this was downgraded to the B2122. It also may have been used near Hook connecting the A30 to the A32 as a replacement of a section of the A287, but this was probably a typo for the A3062. It became the A287 again in 1935. |
| A2013 | | | First used along London Road, High Street, and White Post Hill through Farningham along an old routing of the A20. Later downgraded to Class II status (apparently early on) and is now unclassified. Next used from A284 to A259 in Littlehampton as an upgrade of the B2197. Became part of the A259 Littlehampton Bypass by the end of the 1980s. |
| A2014 | A21 near Tonbridge | A26 near Tonbridge | Previously allocated to Bull Lane, High Street, and Old London Road in Wrotham along an old routing of the A20. Now unclassified; the western junction with the A20 is now gone due to the M20 and Bull Lane has been split in two by the A227 bypass. |
| A2015 | Catford | Beckenham | |
| A2016 | Plumstead | Erith | Previously allocated to Fraser Road from A206 (now Pembroke Road) to A206 (now Walnut Tree Road) in Erith; this became part of the A206 while the road was reassigned to the old route of the A206 (now Pembroke Road, Jessett Close, West Street, and Walnot Tree Road). |
| A2017 | Strood | Strood | North Street; signed as a spur of the A228 |
| A2018 | Bexley | Dartford | |
| ~~A2019~~ | | | Unused |
| A2020 | | | Ran along the old A20 through Maidstone; created in 1961 when the section of the M20 between what is now J5 and J8 opened as the A20(M), but was renumbered in 1977 to its original designation of A20 when the M20 was extended. There was an earlier A2020, but its location is unknown. |
| A2021 | Willingdon | Eastbourne | |
| A2022 | West Wickham | Epsom | Previously allocated to a road from Kingsfold to A29; this became a spur of the A29, and is now the unclassified Marches Road. |
| A2023 | Hove | West Blatchington | |
| A2024 | | | Ran from Crockerhill to Climping as an upgrade of the B2144. The road was split in two by Tangmere Airfield during WWII, and was never replaced. The western half later became the B2144 again, while the eastern section was rerouted to link up with the A27 near Crockerhill. What remained of the route was downgraded to Class II status as the B2233 in the 1970s. |
| A2025 | South Lancing | North Lancing | From junction with A259, north to junction with A27 at Lancing Manor Roundabout. |
| A2026 | Thames Road, Dartford | Home Gardens, Dartford | Previously allocated to Kingston Road and High Street in Ewell, with spurs on London Road and Cheam Road. |
| A2027 | | | Ran from A271 at Boreham Street to A269 (now B2204) west of Battle as an upgrade of the B2097. Downgraded in the 1980s to the B2204, but was upgraded again in the 1990s to the A271 (the B2204 moved to the former A269). |
| A2028 | | | Ran along former A21 from the A21 (now B2211) to Sevenoaks; the southbound side followed the former A21 and the northbound side followed the former B2211. Renumbered as an extension of the A224 after the M25 was built. There was an earlier A2028, but its location is unknown. |
| A2029 | A275 near Lewes | A26 near Lewes | Originally a short link in Lewes; later extended northwest replacing part of the A275. |
| A2030 | Bedhampton | Southsea | |
| A2031 | Offington Lane, Worthing | Teville Road, Worthing | |
| A2032 | West Worthing | East Worthing | |
| A2033 | A259 at Folkestone | A260 at Folkestone | |
| A2034 | M20 near Channel Tunnel | Folkestone | |
| A2035 | | | Ran from A2 via High Street (the old route of the A2) in Chatham to the A2; this became part of a then-new one-way system on the A2, except for one pedestrianized portion, but when the one-way system on the A2 was eliminated, the route was declassified except for the eastern end that is part of an A2 gyratory. Route may be classified as the C460. |
| A2036 | North of Bexhill | East of Bexhill | |
| A2037 | Henfield | Upper Beeding | |
| A2038 | Brighton | Brighton | |
| A2039 | | | Ran along Park Hill Road from the A232 to the A212 in Croydon. Now part of the B243, although it is still signed as A2039 at both ends. Number also appears on a Tourist Information sign in Canterbury, referring to the route that runs from the A2 to the A290. This route is actually the A2050; the A2039 number has been found nowhere else, suggesting that it is a typo. |
| A2040 | Eastbourne | Eastbourne | The Avenue, Eastbourne Town Centre |
| A2041 | Thamesmead | Abbey Wood | |
| A2042 | Ashford | Kennington | |
| A2043 | Cheam | Norbiton | |
| A2044 | Reigate | Salfords | |
| A2045 | | | Ran from M2 motorway J3 near Walderslade to Lordswood. Declassified by 2011. |
| A2046 | | | Ran from the A3 to the A288 in Portsmouth as an upgrade of the B2153. Now part of the A2030. |
| A2047 | Hilsea | Portsmouth | |
| ~~A2048~~ - ~~A2049~~ | | | Unused |
| A2050 | Harbledown | Bridge | Link road to/from A2 (Dover Road) and Canterbury city center. Briefly becomes part of A28 after Rheims Way and until New Dover Road. |
| ~~A2051~~ | | | Unused |
| A2052 | Unused | | Ran from Charlton to Millennium Dome. Declassified by 2009. |
| ~~A2053~~ - ~~A2055~~ | | | Unused |
| A2056 | | | Listed in the DfT Roads List as starting in Greenwich. Route unknown. |
| ~~A2057~~ - ~~A2065~~ | | | Unused |
| A2066 | Reserved | | Reserved for Tonbridge. Route unknown. |
| A2067 | Reserved | | Reserved for Tonbridge. Route unknown. |
| A2068 | Reserved | | Reserved for Tonbridge. Route unknown. |
| ~~A2069~~ | | | Unused |
| A2070 | Kennington | Brenzett | |
| A2071 | | | Listed in DfT Roads List as a road in Portsmouth. Route unknown. |
| ~~A2072~~ | | | Unused |
| A2073 | | | Ran from A27 (now A270) to A23 in Brighton; was a portion of the A27 before it was extended along the A26. Later became a spur of the A27, but when the A27 was rerouted along the northern bypass it was renumbered as the A270, making the route a spur of the A270. |
| ~~A2074~~ - ~~A2078~~ | | | Unused |
| A2079 | | | Number given to the section of former B2164 (now A2070) from M20 J10 to the A28 outside Ashford. The number appeared in two separate pages of the 1999 edition of the Philip's East Kent street atlas. It is not known if this was a typo or a copyright trap, but the number was officially never used. |
| ~~A2080~~ - ~~A2098~~ | | | Unused |
| A2099 | Reserved | | Reserved for Kingsdowne Road (current A3210), Kingston upon Thames, even though it is out of zone. |
| A2100 | Johns Cross | Hastings, between Ashdown and Conquest | |
| A2101 | Silverhill | Hastings town centre | Short link road |
| A2102 | Bohemia, Hastings | St Leonards-on-Sea | Short link road |
| ~~A2103~~ - ~~A2197~~ | | | Unused |
| A2198 | The Borough | Tower Bridge | Long Lane |
| A2199 | Herne Hill | Crystal Palace | In the London Boroughs of Lambeth and Southwark: Croxted Road, South Croxted Road; in the London Borough of Southwark: Dulwich Wood Park, College Road |
| A2200 | | | Ran along Queen Elizabeth Street from the A100 to the A200. Now just a portion of the A100/A200 junction. |
| A2201 | | | Ran as a road from A200 and A101 in Rotherhithe Tunnel to the Rotherhithe Street bridge in Surrey Quays. Now part of a rerouted B205. |
| A2202 | | | Ran from A200 in Surrey Quays to Norway Gate (Lady Dock entrance). Now part of a rerouted B205. |
| A2203 | A206 | Blackwall Tunnel | Blackwall Lane |
| A2204 | Woolwich | Woolwich Ferry | Unsigned short access road from Woolwich Ferry to the South Circular Road |
| A2205 | Tower Bridge Road | Tooley Street, near London Bridge station | Bermondsey Street |
| A2206 | Rotherhithe | Tower Bridge Road | |
| A2207 | | | Ran along Abbey Street and Druid Street from A200 in South London to Crucifix Lane (Abbey Street portion became part of the B202, a portion replaced by A200 one-way service, and the rest was declassified). Originally followed Thurland Road and Spa Road from Old Jamaica Road to the A2206; the route was relocated when the A200 was rerouted off of Old Jamaica Road. |
| A2208 | Old Kent Road | Surrey Quays | |
| A2209 | Deptford | Deptford Bridge | Deptford Church Street |
| A2210 | Deptford | Lewisham | |
| A2211 | Greenwich | Lewisham | |
| A2212 | Lee Green | Bromley | The Burnt Ash road, Hill and Lane. Previously allocated to Lewis Grove in Lewisham from A20 to A21. This became a spur of the A21 when the number was reused on the current route, an upgrade of the southern end of the B212. |
| A2213 | Blackheath | Eltham | |
| A2214 | Brixton | New Cross | |
| A2215 | Peckham | Peckham Rye | |
| A2216 | Sydenham | Denmark Hill | |
| A2217 | Clapham Common | Camberwell | |
| A2218 | Sydenham | Bell Green, Sydenham | |
| A2219 | Crawley | Crawley | |
| A2220 | Copthorne | Crawley | |
| ~~A2221~~ - ~~A2259~~ | | | Unused |
| A2260 | Southfleet | Northfleet | |
| ~~A2261~~ - ~~A2269~~ | | | Unused |
| A2270 | Polegate | Eastbourne | |
| ~~A2271~~ - ~~A2279~~ | | | Unused |
| A2280 | Eastbourne | Eastbourne | Cross levels Way from Kings Drive to Lottbridge Drove and A22 junction for Golden Jubilee Way. |
| ~~A2281~~ - ~~A2289~~ | | | Unused |
| A2290 | Eastbourne | Eastbourne | Short link road |
| ~~A2291~~ - ~~A2299~~ | | | Unused |
| A2300 | Burgess Hill | Hickstead | |
| A2310 | Unused | | Shown on some maps from Brompton, Kent to Medway Tunnel, but is either a typo or a copyright trap. Other maps (including the OS maps) show the route as unclassified and the route is unsigned. Medway Council officially lists the route as the C372. |
| ~~A2311~~ - ~~A2399~~ | | | Unused |
| A2400 | Unused | | Former routing of A24 south of Horsham. Much of route now B2237 except the section in central Horsham which is now unclassified. |
| ~~A2401~~ - ~~A2499~~ | | | Unused |
| A2500 | Cowstead Farm | Eastchurch | |
| ~~A2501~~ - ~~A2589~~ | | | Unused |
| A2590 | Reserved | | Reserved, probably for the former A259 in Bexhill when bypass is complete. |
| ~~A2600~~ - ~~A2689~~ | | | Unused |
| A2690 | Bexhill | Hastings | Created 2015. |
| A2691 | Bexhill | Bexhill | Created 2019. |
| A2700 | Reserved | | Ran along Titmore Lane linking the A27/A280 grade separated junction to the A259 roundabout with the A2032. The number was reserved when the new grade separated junction was built as Titmore Lane was proposed to be improved to support new housing development, and would be numbered A2700 when works were completed. However these works never took place due to local opposition. The route remains signed at the A27/A280 junction, but is signed as "(A27)" at the A259/A2032 junction. West Sussex Council sometimes uses the number to refer to the road in documentation, or otherwise claim the road is part of the C37. |
| ~~A2701~~ - ~~A2989~~ | | | Unused |
| A2990 | Yorkletts | Herne Bay | Former route of the A299 which now bypasses Whitstable to the south. |
