= A215 road =

Road in London, England

A215

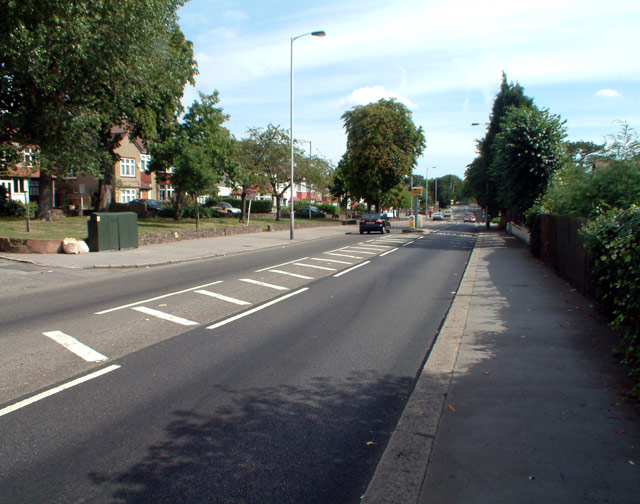
- The A215 running through Norwood, London.

Major junctions
- North end: Elephant and Castle
- A3 A202 A2216 A2214 A205 A214 A212 A213 A222 A232
- South end: Shirley

Location
- Country: United Kingdom
- Constituent country: England

Road network
- Roads in the United Kingdom; Motorways; A and B road zones
← A214	→ A216

The A215 is an A road in south London, starting at Elephant and Castle and finishing around Shirley. It runs through the London Boroughs of Lambeth, Southwark and Croydon.

The A215 was Britain's most crash-prone A road between 1999 and 2010, having 2,836 crashes over its ten-mile length.

== Route ==
=== Walworth Road ===
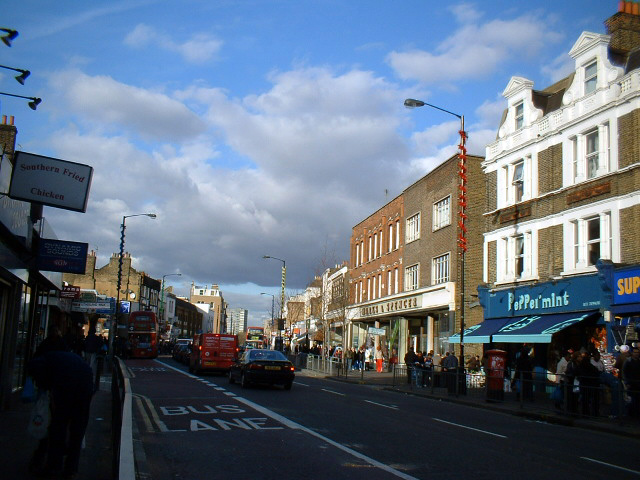
Walworth Road on a Saturday afternoon in 2003

At its northernmost point at Elephant & Castle in Newington, the A215 begins as Walworth Road, which runs between Elephant and Castle and Camberwell Road. It runs through Walworth and is the major shopping street of the area. East Street Market is especially busy on Fridays, Saturdays and Sundays. Other attractions include the Cuming Museum, Newington Reference Library and John Smith House, a former Labour Party headquarters which is now used by the local education authority.

Charles Babbage, the Victorian mathematician and computer pioneer, was likely born at 44 Crosby Row, now Larcom Street, Walworth Road on 26 December 1791. A commemorative blue plaque is displayed on the Sexual Health Clinic at the junction of Larcom Street and Walworth Road.

Just off the Walworth Road was Walworth Road railway station on the London, Chatham and Dover Railway that was opened in 1863 and shut in 1916 due to wartime constraints.

=== Camberwell Road ===
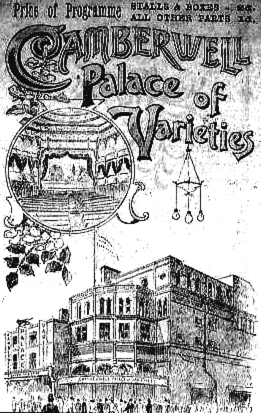
The Camberwell Palace of Varieties

Walworth Road transitions into Camberwell Road where the A215 enters the former Metropolitan Borough of Camberwell. The road runs adjacent to the railway between Elephant & Castle tube station and Loughborough Junction railway station. Much of Camberwell Road is a conservation area, due to its well-preserved large houses from the early 19th century.

By the time of the Domesday Book, Camberwell was already a significant settlement. The town remained a popular resort for Londoners due to its believed medicinal wells. In 1685, John Evelyn's Diary mentions a Roman urn filled with bones which was uncovered intact during repairs to the road and exhibited at the Royal Society.

Camberwell Green, at the junction of Camberwell Road and Camberwell Church Street, was the traditional site of Camberwell Fair, an annual fair held every August. Following complaints about the noise and high crime levels generated by the fair, a group of residents bought the fairground in 1855, converting it into the park which remains today.

In Victorian times Camberwell Road was a focal point of south London's Music hall scene, with a number of music halls opening from the 1850s onwards. Following the advent of the cinema and later of television, the music halls fell into decline, with the last closing in 1956. Nearby Orpheus Street marks the site of the Metropole Music Hall.

Since the New Works Programme of the 1930s, London Transport and its successors have planned to extend the Bakerloo line south to a station on Camberwell Road. The original plans were abandoned due to the Second World War before much construction had been completed. Construction again began in the 1950s and 1970s, but was abandoned each time. Transport for London still intends to build this extension, but no date has been set for the work.

=== Denmark Hill ===
After the A215 crosses the A202 it becomes Denmark Hill. This road was originally known as Dulwich Hill, and was renamed in 1683 to commemorate the marriage of Princess Anne (later Queen Anne) to Prince George of Denmark. The road runs between King's College Hospital and The Maudsley Hospital before going alongside Ruskin Park. Further south the road passes the Denmark Hill Estate.

The Victorian art critic, author and social critic John Ruskin lived at 163 Denmark Hill from 1842 to 1871. The house no longer stands and is now the site of a block of council flats. Ruskin Park, immediately south of the twin hospitals, is named in his honour.

Denmark Hill is home to two of London's largest hospitals, the general King's College Hospital (part of King's College London) which moved to the site from its original central London location in 1913, and the Maudsley psychiatric hospital.

It is believed by historians that 168, 170 and 172 Denmark Hill were designed by noted architect and prison designer William Blackburn due their similarity in architectural style to his other buildings. However, as the original documentation relating to the construction of these houses has been lost or destroyed, it has proved impossible to confirm this.

Immediately south of the Maudsley Hospital is Denmark Hill railway station, built in 1866 and rebuilt following a fire in 1980, on the South London line. This station forms part of the East London line westward extension to Clapham Junction as part of the London Overground network.

=== Herne Hill ===
The road continues southwest into Herne Hill, a short stretch of road running through the area of the same name. The origin of the name is disputed, but possibly derives from herons nesting on the (now buried) River Effra. The earliest known usage of the name "Herne Hill" dates from 1798.

St Paul's church was rebuilt in gothic style by the architect George Edmund Street in 1858.

Herne Hill railway station is at the southern end of Herne Hill, on a busy six-road junction. It opened in 1862 and was initially the southern terminus of the London, Chatham and Dover Railway

=== Norwood Road ===
Norwood Road begins after Herne Hill railway station. It runs alongside Brockwell Park and then south to Tulse Hill. A manor house known as "Brockholle" or "Brockhalle" (the origin of the name "Brockwell") was built on Norwood Road, on what is now a part of Brockwell Park, in the mid-15th century. In 1809 the building was bought by wealthy merchant and Sheriff of London John Blades. Blades demolished the building, and built Brockwell Hall as a replacement at the top of the hill in the park; this building still stands today.

Tulse Hill railway station is on this road. After passing the station, Norwood Road continues south past West Norwood Cemetery (home of 65 Listed Monuments) to West Norwood and the Norwood Triangle. Norwood Road is home to St Luke's Church, a Grade II listed building designed by Francis Octavius Bedford in 1823–5 and rebuilt by GE Street in 1870.

The Regal Cinema opened on Norwood Road in January 1930; it was unusual in that it also staged live stage shows to accompany films (including performances by animals from circuses visiting the nearby park). It was home to the Regal Redheads, a troupe of dancing girls who performed in the interval.

=== Knights Hill and Norwood High Street ===
Knights Hill starts in the north at West Norwood in the Norwood Triangle one-way system, and runs through a council ward also named as Knight's Hill. It ends in the south at a junction with the A214 at Crown Lane and Crown Dale. Knights Hill becomes Beulah Hill here at Crown Point. To the north, south of Knight's Hill is the part of the Crystal Palace area with no name home to a large parade of competing large super markets along the A215 Norwood Road including Tesco, Cooperative, Iceland and (by Summer 2009) Sainsbury (ex Woolworth's site). West Norwood railway station is on this road. Knights Hill contains the Knights Hill Nature Reserve, one of the last remaining vestiges of the Great North Wood which once covered the area.

The 1647 Parliamentary Survey described Knights Hill as "a small common wood containing 40 pollard oaks and two elms".

=== Beulah Hill ===
Beulah Hill (originally "Gravel Pit Road") begins at a crossroads where the A215 crosses the A214 and Knights Hill becomes Beulah Hill. The road makes a sharp turn to the east where it continues through the neighbourhoods of Upper Norwood. On the sharp bend is the ornamental Beulah Hill Pond. Formerly "Big Pond", it was intended as a watering stop for horses and cattle using the road, and still contains a railing to prevent animals straying into deep water. The "Conquering Hero" pub was built next to the pond for the use of people stopping to allow livestock to use the pond, and remains today.

The composer and organist of St Paul's Cathedral, Thomas Attwood, lived in a large house on Beulah Hill from 1821 to 1834. Felix Mendelssohn stayed at the Attwood family home, once in 1829 and again in 1832, completing some compositions there. The house was demolished in the late 1960s.

In March 1966, shortly before the World Cup tournament, the Jules Rimet trophy was stolen from an exhibition at Central Hall Westminster. It was found seven days later by a dog named Pickles, wrapped in newspaper at the bottom of a suburban garden hedge at Beulah Hill. The story made national headlines.

Nearby is St Joseph's College founded in 1855, one of the first Catholic educational institutions to be opened in England following the restoration of the Catholic hierarchy. Beulah Hill was the site of Britain's first independent television transmitter, built by the Independent Television Authority in 1955. Beulah Hill ends at a junction with the A212 (Church Road). From this junction, the A215 is called South Norwood Hill.

=== South Norwood Hill ===
South Norwood Hill descends sharply towards South Norwood. It becomes Portland Road at the crossroads with the A213 road. Spurgeon's College is a theological college which since 1923 has been located in a mansion built in 1890 and known as Falkland Park. Otherwise this section of the A215 is mainly residential. The former porter's lodge of the Falkland Park estate still stands along South Norwood Hill as no. 217, "Falkland Lodge".

=== Portland Road ===
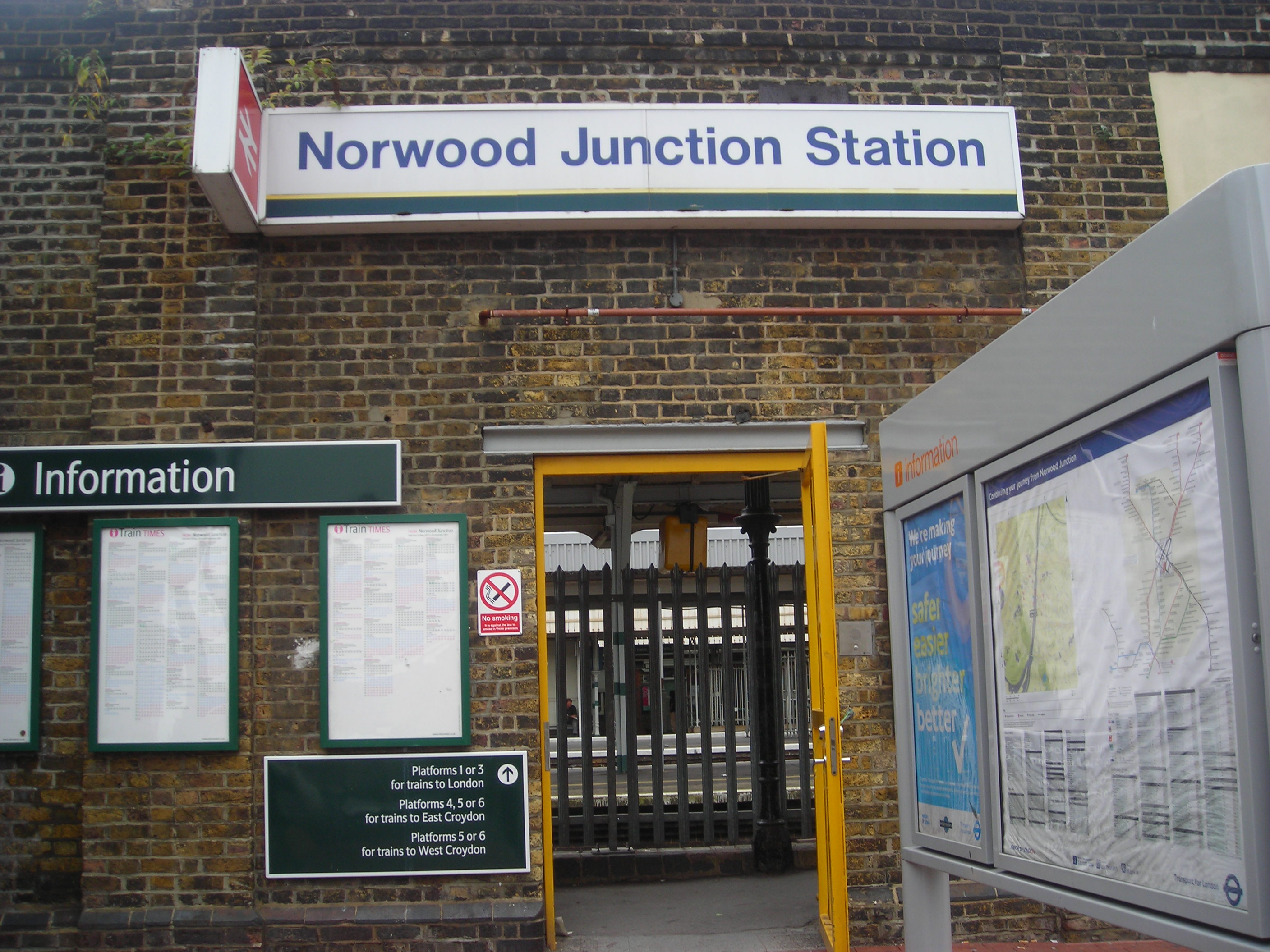
The station entrance to Norwood Junction off Portland Road.

Portland Road begins at a crossroads where the A215 crosses the A213 on South Norwood High Street and South Norwood Hill becomes Portland Road. The road then travels down a hill with many shops (mainly takeaways, newsagents). It passes South Norwood Leisure Centre, a new leisure centre which includes a creche, cafe, gym, swimming pool etc. Portland Road ends with a left turn to stay on the A215 at Spring Lane or straight on to change onto the B243, Woodside Green. From June 2010, the road will be the site of a station on the new London Overground network.

==== Early history ====
The northern section of the road was historically known as "Cholmerden" or "The Goat House". The Minister's of Bailiffs Account of the Chauntry of St Nicholas show that an annual rent of 33 shillings and four pence was paid on the land between 1442–1483; this is the earliest recorded reference to the area. The road at the time ran through an ancient woodland known as the North Wood (the origin of the modern place name Norwood). The area was cleared for farmland in the 16th and 17th centuries. Industrial development began in the early 19th century following construction of the Grand Surrey Canal, linking the area to Surrey Commercial Docks and the River Thames in 1809. This section of the canal was closed in 1836, with the London and Croydon Railway built along the canal bed; modern housing development began in the mid-19th century following the opening of the railway.

==== Jolly-sailor station and the London & Croydon Railway ====
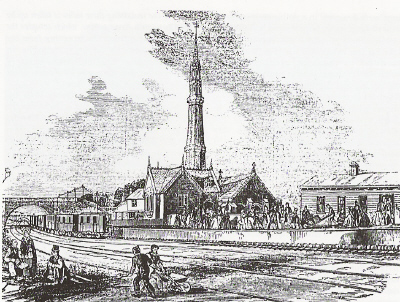
Jolly-sailor station in 1845, showing the bridge carrying Portland Road in the background and the atmospheric propulsion system pumping station, with its Gothic chimney/exhaust vent, in the foreground.

In 1839 the London and Croydon Railway opened Jolly-sailor station (sic)—listed as "Jolly-sailor near Beulah Spa" on fares lists and timetables—at the north end of the street. The station was renamed Norwood in 1846. The station was immediately adjacent to a level crossing over Portland Road.

In 1844, the London and Croydon Railway was given parliamentary authority to test an experimental pneumatic propulsion system on the railway (referred to at the time as the atmospheric-propulsion system). A pumping station was built on Portland Road; this created a vacuum in a pipe paralleling the railway tracks. A piston extended downwards from the trains into a slit in the pipe, meaning that trains were literally sucked towards the pumping station or blown away from it. The pumping station was built in a Gothic style, with a very tall ornate tower which served both as a chimney and as an exhaust vent for air pumped from the propulsion pipe.

As part of the construction works for the atmospheric-propulsion system, the world's first railway flyover was constructed at the north end of Portland Road, to carry the new atmospheric line over the conventional steam line below. In 1847, the atmospheric propulsion experiment was abandoned.

Following construction of new lines, the station closed on 1 June 1859 and was replaced by a new station on the south side of the road, Norwood Junction, which is still in use, now part of the newly-extended East London line of the London Overground which was opened on 23 May 2010.

==== Places of interest ====
One of the earliest cinemas in south London, the Electric Picture Palace, opened on Portland Road in 1910. The cinema was renamed the Central Cinema shortly afterwards, and closed in 1956, and no trace of it now remains.

Portland Road is also home to the "Gold Coast", the only Ghanaian public house in London; this is a focal point for London's Ghanaian community and serves Ghanaian beer, wine and food.

Roots, Routes, Roots (also known as the "Portland Road Mosaic"), an 11-metre (36 ft) long mosaic depicting the history of the Norwood area, is under the railway bridge. The mosaic was designed by artists Gary Drostle and Rob Turner, and built by children from a number of local schools.

=== Spring Lane ===
Spring Lane is a short road that starts at the junction with Woodside Green. It lies entirely within Woodside. St Luke's Church, Ashburton Park, Ashburton Primary School and Woodside tram stop are on this road.

Spring Lane was notable for many years in having one of the few Ancient lights notices in London outside central London, on a private house immediately opposite the station. The sign was taken down in 2005.

==== Woodside tram stop ====
Woodside railway station was built in 1871 to serve Croydon Racecourse (see below). The station was unusual in being designed for horses, with access ramps instead of steps and with unusually high entrances designed to accommodate a horse and rider. In 1997 the railway was replaced by Tramlink; the station is now Woodside tram stop.

=== Shirley Road ===
Shirley Road is the final road on the A215. It is home to Ashburton Community School and Trinity School of John Whitgift. It ends in Shirley, Croydon. Shirley Road skirts the nearby suburb of Addiscombe. The town is named after the historic manor of Adscomb ("Edge of the valley"), the country seat of the Heron family, which was situated on Shirley Road. The building no longer exists.

==== Ashburton Playing Fields ====
Ashburton Playing Fields are just off Shirley Road, behind the school. The fields were first dedicated as a public horse racing course by James I in the early 17th century. Following the opening of the nearby Woodside railway station in 1871 large numbers of Londoners began travelling to the racecourse. Following pressure from the Mayor of Croydon, concerned about the large crowds, the racecourse was closed in 1890 and replaced with a golf course; this was bought by the council in 1942 and given to public use as playing fields.
