= Addington Road =

Addington Road may refer to:

- The Addington Road, Ontario, a colonisation road in Ontario
- Addington Road, Croydon, a portion of the A2022 near Addington, London
