= A2214 road =

Road in London, England

A2214

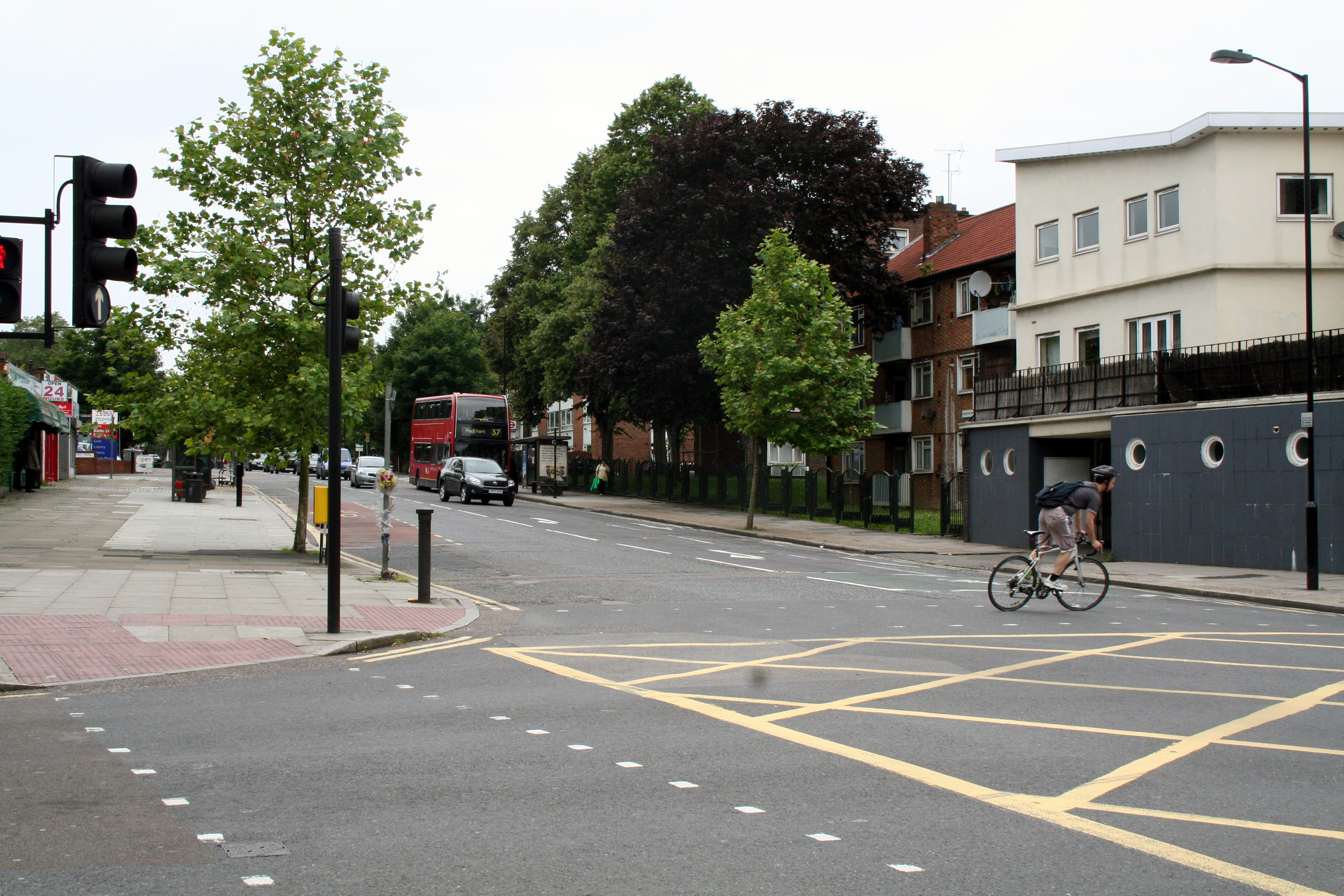
- Peckham: East Dulwich Road. Looking west along East Dulwich Road (A2214) from its crossroads with Peckham Rye (B219).

Route information
- Length: 3.6 mi (5.8 km)

Major junctions
- East end: New Cross
- A202 A2215 A2216 A215 A204
- West end: Brixton

Location
- Country: United Kingdom
- Constituent country: England

Road network
- Roads in the United Kingdom; Motorways; A and B road zones
← A2213	→ A2215

The A2214 is an A road in South London. It runs between the A202 Queen's Road and the A204 Effra Road. It is one of the many inner London roads that is not signposted for almost the full-length of the road. In 2020, the road saw an average of around 11,550 vehicles travelling along the road, down from approximately 14,850 in 2019.
