= Putney Leisure Centre =

Leisure centre in Putney, England

Coordinates: 51.4636941°N 0.2284814°W

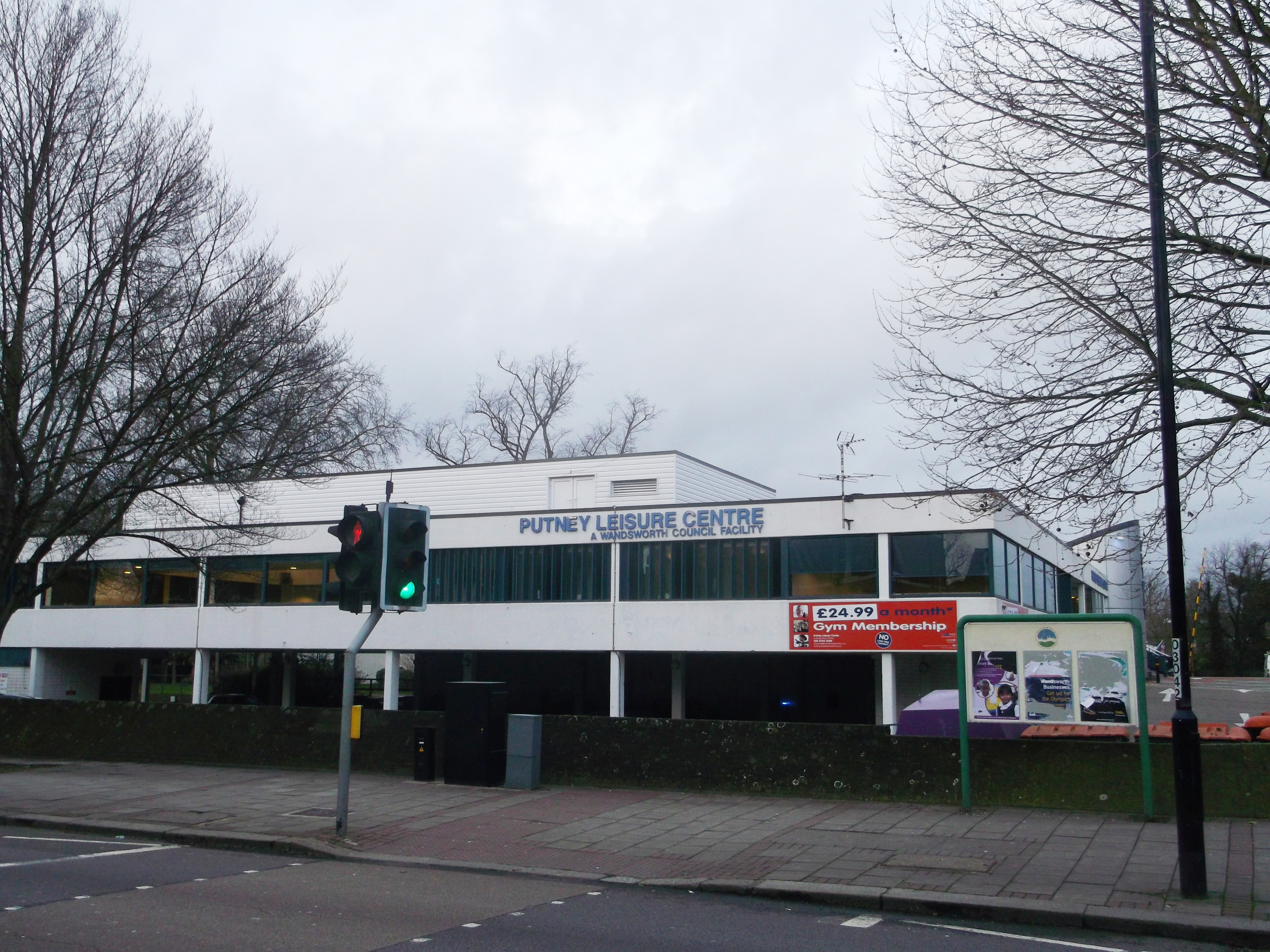
Putney Leisure Centre

Putney Leisure Centre is a public sports complex in Putney, in the London Borough of Wandsworth.

== Location ==
The leisure centre is on the north side of the Upper Richmond road on the corner with Dryburgh road, and backs on the south side of the South Western Trains railway line between Barnes and Putney. The building is located Between the Landford road and West Putney conservation areas.

== History ==
The Leisure Centre building was built in 1968, designed by the architectural practice Powell & Moya, who also in Putney designed Mayfield school (now Ashcroft Technology Academy). Under the building is a sunken car park and garden, the 33m swimming pool is an "L" shape, incorporating a swimming area and 4m deep splash pool diving area, the first such pool of its type.

The building won a RIBA arichitecture award in 1969 and is locally listed.

In the 1980s there was an extension built with a Jacuzzi, steam rooms and a fitness suite with gym equipment. The Leisure Centre is managed as of 2021 by Places Leisure for Wandsworth Borough Council.
