= Weston Education Centre =

Education center in South London, United Kingdom

- 51.46859493237837°N 0.09520300033155883°W
- Location: London, England

Other information
- Affiliation: Kings College

The Weston Education Centre is located at 10 Cutcombe Rd, Brixton, Denmark Hill, South London. It is a purpose built teaching centre with lecture theatres, classrooms, meeting space, and a library. The library holds approximately 15000 books and other materials. Over 500 print journals are subscribed to, with a further 7000 electronic titles available via the internet.

The library has a special focus on the field of medicine, with materials on such topics as gastroenterology, liver disease, diabetes, obstetrics, gynaecology, paediatrics, the history of medicine, palliative care, public health, health care policy, and medical audit utilized by researchers and instructors at King's College London GKT School of Medical Education, King's College Hospital NHS Trust and the South London & Maudsley NHS Trust.

The centre is ten minutes walk from Denmark Hill railway station.
