= A2022 road =

Road in south London and northern Surrey

A2022

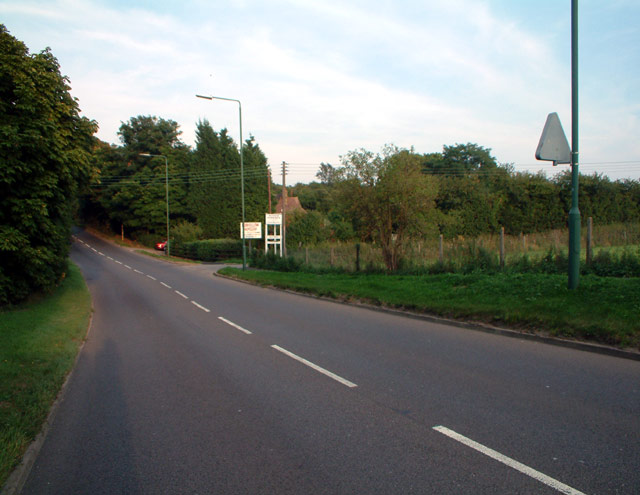
- The A2022 road near Woodmansterne, Surrey.

Major junctions
- East end: West Wickham
- A232 A212; A22; A23 A235 A237 A217 A240; A24
- West end: Epsom

Location
- Country: United Kingdom
- Constituent country: England

Road network
- Roads in the United Kingdom; Motorways; A and B road zones
← A2021	→ A2023

The A2022 is a non-primary road in England. It runs south-west into the foothills of the North Downs from West Wickham in the London Borough of Bromley through Addington, Forestdale, Selsdon, Sanderstead, Purley, the Woodcote part of that town, Banstead in Surrey and Epsom Downs through which it descends to a similar altitude as at its beginning to end at Epsom.

== Route ==
=== West Wickham to Purley ===
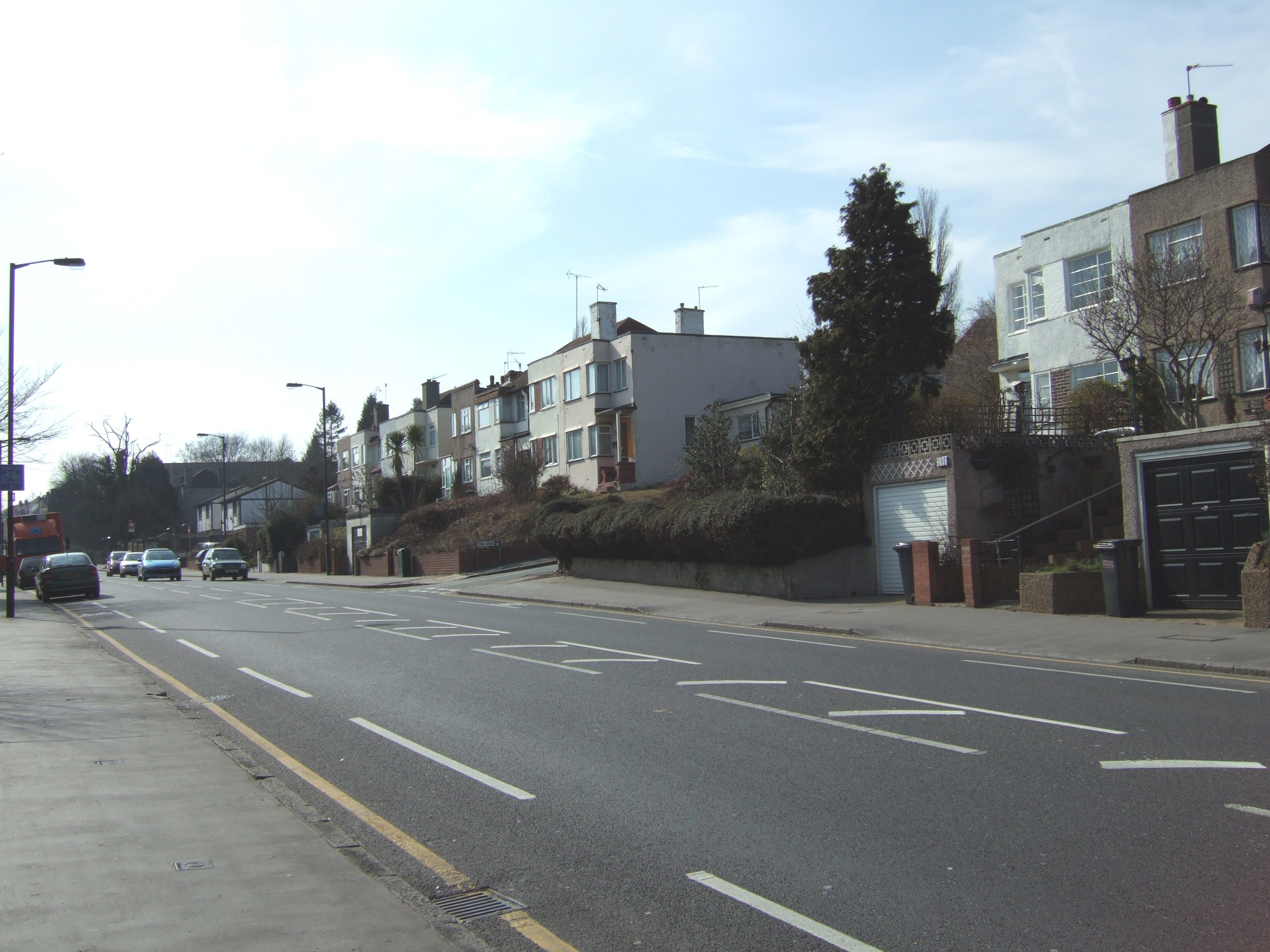
A2022 road at Selsdon

The A2022 starts in West Wickham in the London Borough of Bromley at a roundabout with the A232 and a minor road, of which it acts as a continuation, as Addington Road 1 mile (1.6 km) before entering the London Borough of Croydon. As it enters linear Addington Village it runs as Kent Gate Way and passes Addington Village Interchange on the Tramlink. It then crosses the tramlink and a roundabout with the A212. It runs as Selsdon Park Road past Forestdale, Selsdon and Selsdon, where it again becomes Addington Road as the elevated district's only A-road, passing Selsdon Community Centre and heads into Sanderstead past its common at 175m AOD (an overall high point), before coming to a roundabout with the B269. The A2022 becomes Rectory Park, and then Mitchley Avenue, where it passes near Riddlesdown railway station, Downs Court Road as it comes into Purley and it stops at a T-Junction with the A22, 300m from Purley Cross and Purley railway station to which it has its own continuation Approach Road leading to a station drop-off apron.

=== Purley to Oaks Park ===
The Purley to Nork westerly less straight, curved hill-cross route starts at a set of traffic lights with the A23, part of the Purley Cross system as Foxley Lane and it climbs through the Woodcote locality, before it comes to a mini roundabout with Woodcote Road and Smitham Bottom Lane (both A237). It changes name to Little Woodcote Lane, and leaves the suburban landscape as it heads into Little Woodcote in the London Borough of Sutton, passing a wide area of farms. It then comes to two mini-roundabouts with the B278, the first roundabout for the northbound road to Carshalton, and the second, for the southbound road to Woodmansterne. It passes wide Oaks Park (London), Carshalton and comes to a dip at 104 m above sea level as it exits Greater London.

=== Oaks Park to Nork ===
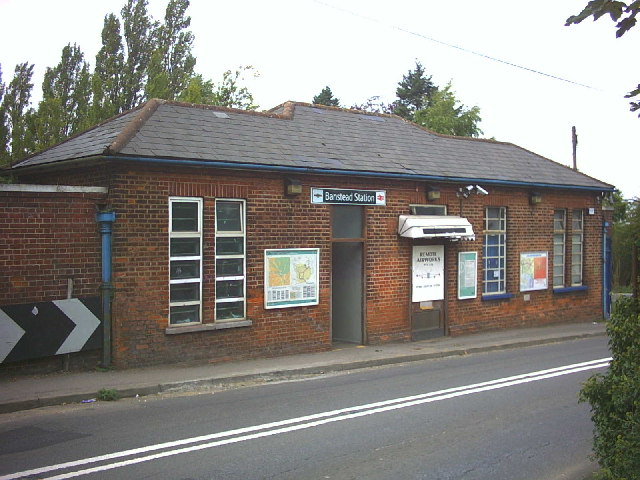
Banstead railway station on the A2022

The road enters, with further gentle curves, an unnamed outlying neighbourhood of Banstead in the Surrey borough of Reigate & Banstead and ascends through low-density housing. It reaches a westerly high-point of 152m Ordnance Datum just before entering Banstead. It then descends, before coming to a mini roundabout with the B2219 Bolters Lane. Almost immediately after the mini roundabout, it comes to the Banstead Crossroads with the A217.

The A2022 becomes Fir Tree Road and heads west, passes within 50m of Banstead railway station in the Nork locality westwards; then it stops at the crossroads by the Drift Bridge, 500m short of Epsom Downs railway station, where it co-runs with the A240 and faces the B291 (also Fir Tree Road).

=== Drift Bridge to Epsom ===
On the other side of the Drift Bridge at a roundabout, the Drift Bridge to Epsom section of the A2022 starts as College Road. After about half a mile, it comes to crossroads with Longdown Lane North and South; the South being the B288. It then passes Epsom College, before College Road heads left and the A2022 becomes Alexandra Road. It passes near Alexandra recreation ground and the other part of the B288 (Bridge Road.) It changes name to Upper High Street and it passes an Odeon Cinema before coming to the junction in Epsom Town Centre with the A24 High Street and East Street, and the B284 Church Street.

== Notable places ==
The road at Epsom is home to the Upper High Street which includes a large Odeon cinema and the Laine Theatre Arts. Also on the road are Epsom College, Croydon High School, John Ruskin College, Croydon RFC and the Wickham Theatre

== See also ==
- Great Britain road numbering scheme
