= A202 road =

Primary A road in London, England

Coordinates: 51.48°N 0.11°W

A202

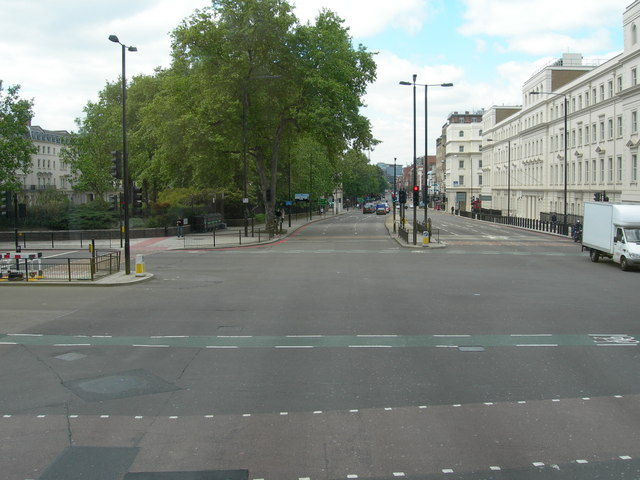
- Vauxhall Bridge Road (A202) at junction with A3212. This is where 2 busy roads meet -- the A3212 Grosvenor Road / Millbank, and the A202 Vauxhall Bridge / Vauxhall Bridge Road. We are looking up Vauxhall Bridge Road towards Victoria.

Route information
- Length: 4.9 mi (7.9 km)

Major junctions
- East end: New Cross Gate
- A2 A2214 A2215 A215; A23; A3 A3204 A203 A3036 A3205 A3212 A3213 A3214 A302
- West end: Victoria

Location
- Country: United Kingdom
- Primary destinations: New Cross Pimlico; Camberwell; Kennington; Vauxhall; Pimlico Victoria

Road network
- Roads in the United Kingdom; Motorways; A and B road zones

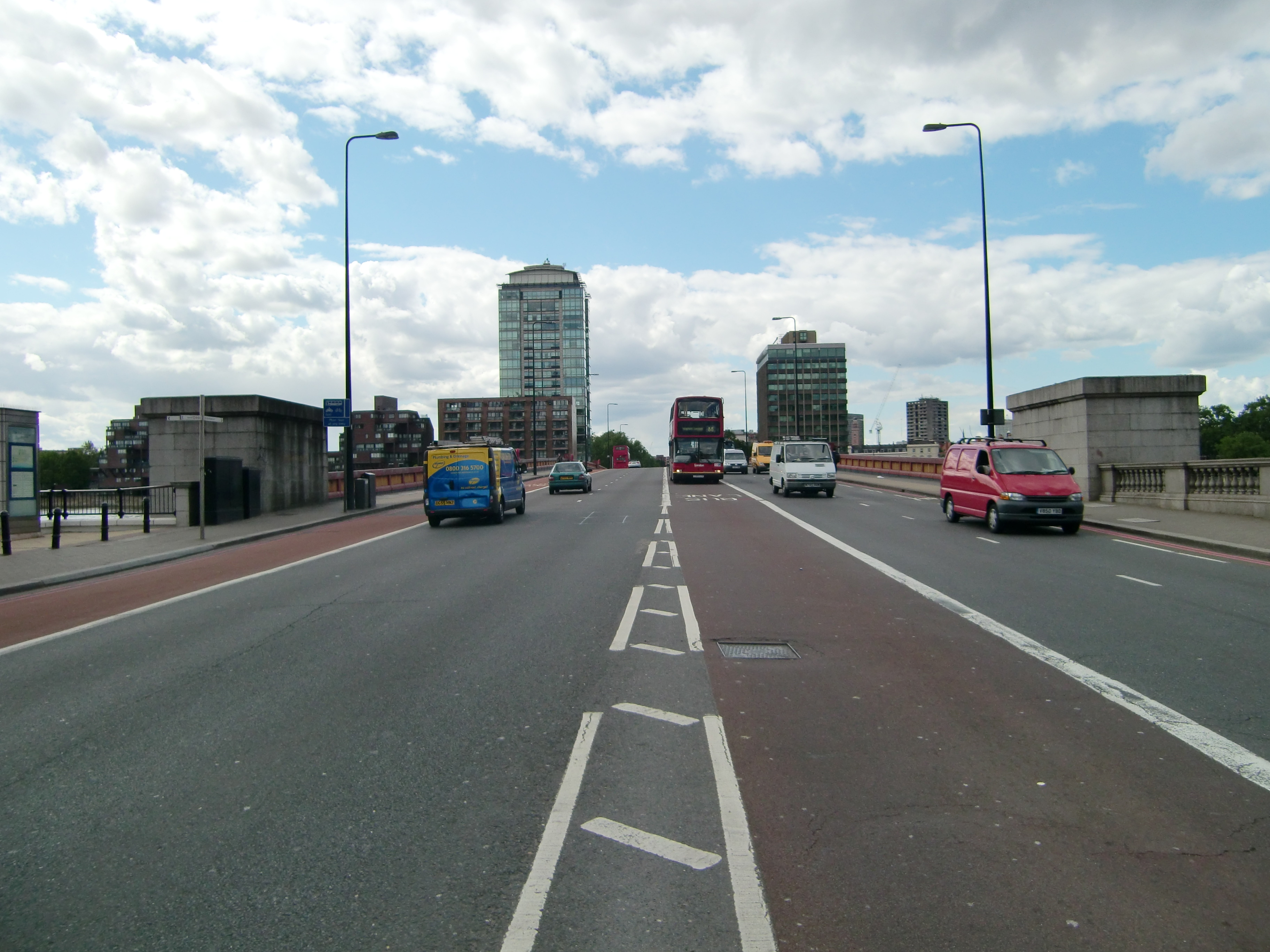
A202 crossing the Thames at Vauxhall Bridge, c.2010. Two bus lanes (the southbound one central) and four lanes for general traffic with a cycle lane marked on the nearside southbound lane. The southbound bus lane was originally central; by 1973 it had been moved nearside.

The A202 is a primary A road in London. It runs from New Cross Gate to London Victoria station. A section of the route forms a part of the London Inner Ring Road between Vauxhall and Victoria, known as Vauxhall Bridge Road.

No part of the route is in the London Congestion Charge zone, but the section between Vauxhall and Victoria is part of the zone's boundary, which is to the immediate west of Vauxhall Bridge Road.

The A202 is managed by Transport for London (TfL) in its entirety, and is designated a London Red Route.

== Route ==
=== London Borough of Lewisham ===
==== New Cross ====
At its eastern end, the A202 begins at a junction with the A2 New Cross Road. Heading westbound, the route is named Queen's Road as it enters Peckham and the London Borough of Southwark at its junction with the A2214 road Lausanne Road the B2227 Pomeroy Street.

=== London Borough of Southwark ===
==== Peckham ====
Continuing westbound, the A202 passes along the northern rim of Nunhead as it continues towards Peckham town centre. It passes the eponymous railway station, Queens Road Peckham, as it enters the central portion of the locality. Queen's Road was formerly known as Deptford Lane. It was renamed around 1866 in honour of Queen Victoria, who often passed through it on her way to the Royal Naval School at New Cross.

The route is named Peckham High Street between the railway station and the road's junction with Rye Lane, after which it is named Peckham Road.

==== Camberwell ====
St Giles Church and the Camberwell College of Arts mark the end of Peckham Road and the point at which it becomes Camberwell Church Street, and at which the route enters Camberwell.

The A202 meets the A215 at a crossroads to the south of King's College Hospital, after which the route is known as Camberwell New Road. A short portion of Camberwell New Road forms the border between the Boroughs of Southwark and Lambeth.

=== London Borough of Lambeth ===
==== Kennington ====
Camberwell New Road enters Lambeth at a junction with Foxley Road in Kennington. In the Lambeth, the A202 meets the A23, which runs southbound towards Brixton and Gatwick Airport, and the A3, which links the City of London to Clapham and destinations in Surrey and Hampshire. Oval tube station is situated at the A202 junction with the A3, and A23 roads.

In Kennington, the A202 runs along the southern rim of The Oval as Harleyford Road. The Oval is the home ground of Surrey County Cricket Club.

==== Vauxhall ====
As it leaves Kennington, the route enters the large Vauxhall gyratory, which encircles the Vauxhall Bus Station. As of April 2019, TfL has plans to reconfigure the gyratory and remove the bus station. The Vauxhall area is famous for its "gay village." The Royal Vauxhall Tavern is situated on the A202 route, at the point where Harleyford Road merges with the gyratory and the nearby Kennington Lane.

The A202 leaves the gyratory in a northwesterly direction over Vauxhall Bridge, the point at which it also leaves Lambeth. At this point, the A202 forms part of the London Inner Ring Road. If heading north-west, traffic travels clockwise around the Ring Road. Travelling anti-clockwise, the Ring Road leaves the Vauxhall gyratory along the A3204 Kennington Lane towards Elephant and Castle in an eastbound direction.

=== City of Westminster ===
==== Pimlico ====
After Vauxhall Bridge, the A202 continues northwest. The first section is called Bessborough Gardens; thereafter it is Vauxhall Bridge Road. The A202's western terminus is at Victoria. The Ring Road continues clockwise (northbound) on A302 Grosvenor Place, which leads towards Hyde Park Corner.

== Landmarks ==
- New Cross Gate station
- Queens Road Peckham station
- South London Gallery
- Camberwell College of Arts
- Camberwell Green
- King's College Hospital
- Maudsley Hospital
- Kennington Park
- Oval tube station
- The Oval
- Royal Vauxhall Tavern
- Vauxhall station
- Vauxhall tube station
- Vauxhall bus station
- Vauxhall Bridge
- London Victoria station
- Victoria tube station
- Victoria bus station
- Victoria Palace Theatre
- Buckingham Palace Garden

== Cycle Superhighway 5 ==
Cycle Superhighway 5 (CS5) runs alongside the A202 between Kennington and Westminster.

The route begins near The Oval on the 'northbound' side of Harleyford Road. CS5 runs northwest towards Vauxhall. At Vauxhall, the route crosses Kennington Lane at a signal-controlled junction, running along the eastern perimeter of the gyratory.

North of the gyratory, CS5 runs as a bike freeway across Vauxhall Bridge, occupying what was formerly the southbound nearside lane (there is no longer a southbound bus lane). On the northern side of the bridge, CS5 meets CS8 at a signposted junction. CS8 runs from Wandsworth to Lambeth Bridge, near the Houses of Parliament.

CS5 continues northwards to Regency Street, where it leaves the A202 and travels towards the centre of Westminster. Cyclists may rejoin the A202 northwest towards Victoria at a signal-controlled junction at this point.

South of The Oval, cyclists on the A202 meet Cycle Superhighway 7. CS7 runs alongside the A3 between Elephant and Castle and Clapham Common. The northbound terminus of CS7 is the City of London, whilst its southern terminus is in Collier's Wood.

For the most part, CS5 is traffic-free and cyclists are segregated from other road traffic.
