= A254 road =

Road in Kent, England

Coordinates: 51.3634°N 1.3948°E

A254

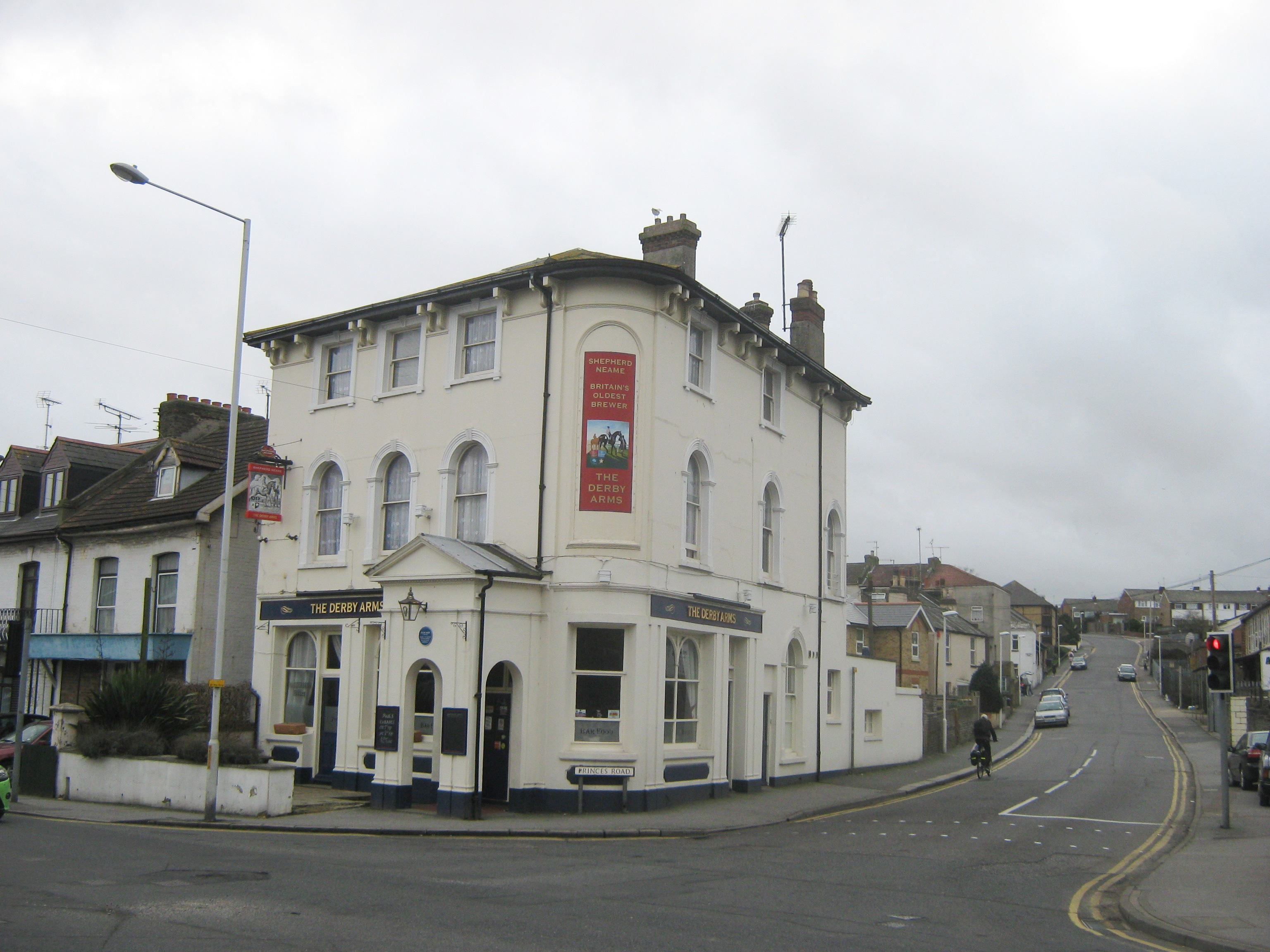
- Derby Arms pub, Ramsgate, on A254

Major junctions
- Northwest end: Margate
- A28 A255 A256
- Southeast end: Ramsgate

Location
- Country: United Kingdom

Road network
- Roads in the United Kingdom; Motorways; A and B road zones
← A253	→ A255

The A254 is a short road running northwest–southeast on the Isle of Thanet in East Kent. The whole length of the road is within Thanet District Council and is a non-primary route.

== Route ==
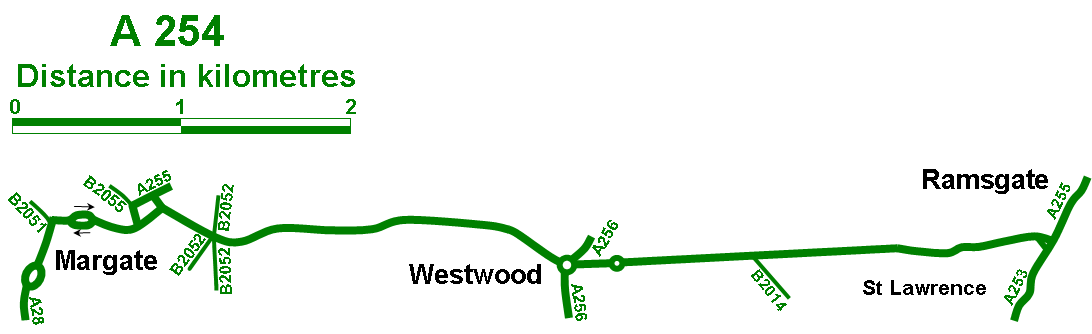
Current route of A254 as of 2008.

=== Margate ===
The road begins in the centre of the Thanet town of Margate, at a roundabout with the A28, B2051 and the B2055 along the seafront, where it heads south-eastwards along Eaton Road, passing the Dreamland Amusement Park. The road continues to travel south-eastwards along Queen's Avenue, within the suburbs of Margate, until it briefly splits into a small one-way system where it meets the A255. This is also where the A255 starts. The A254 then bends to the right, travelling southwards along Ramsgate Road.

The A254 passes the crossroads with the B2052 and shortly after the Queen Elizabeth The Queen Mother Hospital on the eastern side of the road. Here the road turns towards a more south-westerly route again. The majority of buildings are contained on the eastern side of the road.

=== Westwood ===
The A254 Margate Road now journeys through the heart of the Westwood Industrial Estates, which consists of retail parks, shopping centres and superstores. The A254 also meets the A256 at a large roundabout, which provides links to Broadstairs and Dover. Past another roundabout, and the road is generally straight, as it travels in a south-easterly direction.

The A254 meets the B2014 Newington Road in Northwood, which leads to St Lawrence. This area is mainly built up with residential housing and rows of smaller shops.

=== Ramsgate ===
The A254 Margate Road passes under a railway bridge and terminates at a T-junction with the A255 in the heart of Ramsgate.

== Most dangerous road – November 2018 ==
In November 2018, it was listed as Britain's most dangerous road for accidents.
