= Denmark Hill =

Area of south London

Coordinates: 51.4678°N 0.0902°W

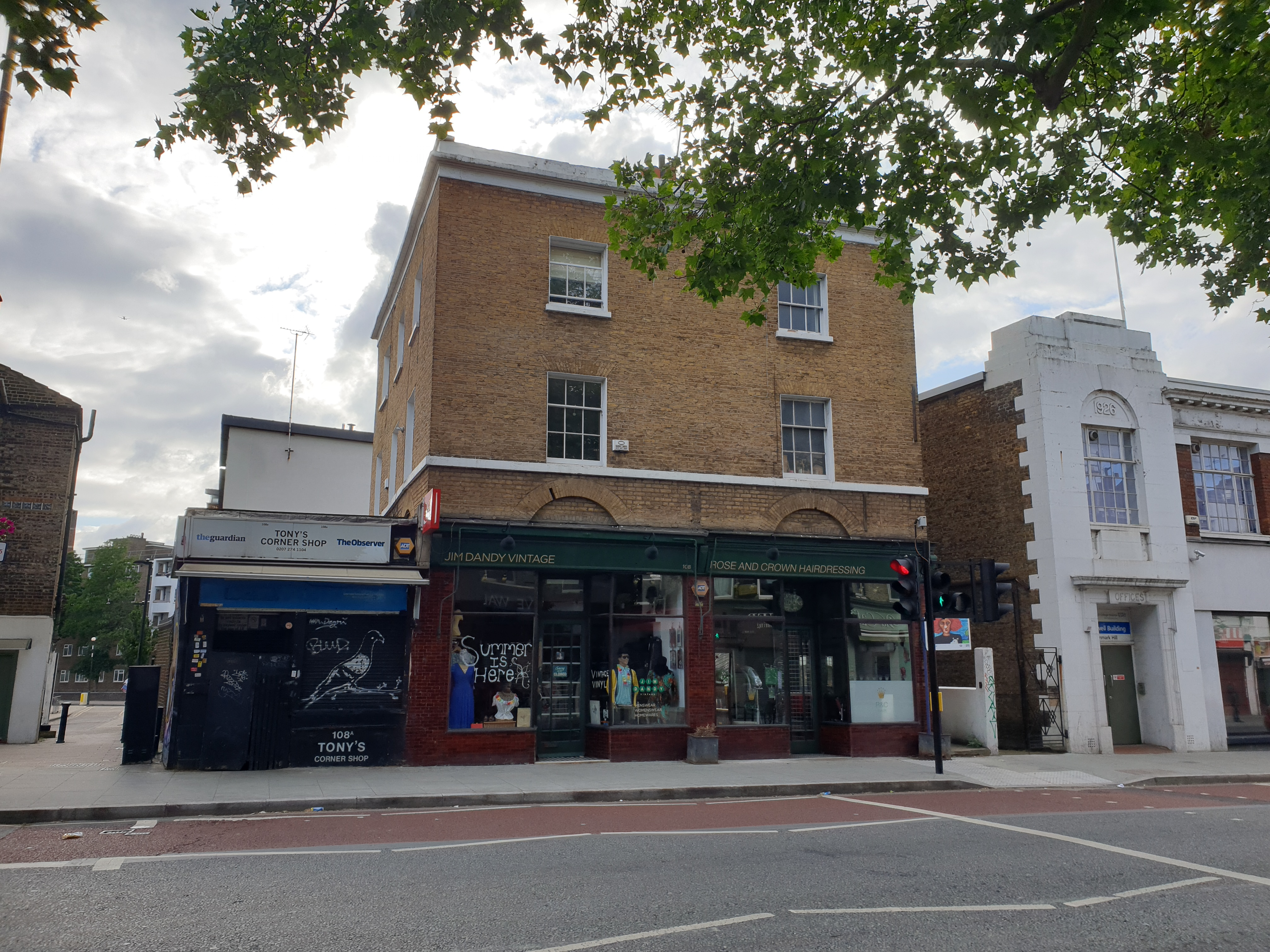
- Shops in Denmark Hill

- Location within Greater London
- OS grid reference: TQ327760
- London borough: Southwark
- Ceremonial county: Greater London
- Region: London
- Country: England
- Sovereign state: United Kingdom
- Post town: LONDON
- Postcode district: SE5
- Dialling code: 020
- Police: Metropolitan
- Fire: London
- Ambulance: London
- London Assembly: Lambeth and Southwark

Denmark Hill is an area and road in Camberwell, in the London Borough of Southwark, London, England. It is a sub-section of the western flank of the Norwood Ridge, centred on the long, curved Ruskin Park slope of the ridge. The road is part of the A215 which north of its main foot, Camberwell Green, becomes Camberwell Road and south of Red Post Hill becomes named Herne Hill, another district.

== Toponymy ==
The area and road is said to have acquired its name from Queen Anne's husband, Prince George of Denmark, who hunted there. High Street, Camberwell was renamed Denmark Hill as part of metropolitan street renaming.

== History ==
In John Cary's map of 1786 the area is shown as Dulwich Hill. The only building apparent is the "Fox under the Hill". The present "Fox on the Hill" pub is a hundred yards or so further up (south), on the site of former St Matthew's Vicarage adjacent to a triangle of land rumoured to be a "plague pit" or burial ground. The name of the area was changed in honour of the husband of Queen Anne, Prince George of Denmark.

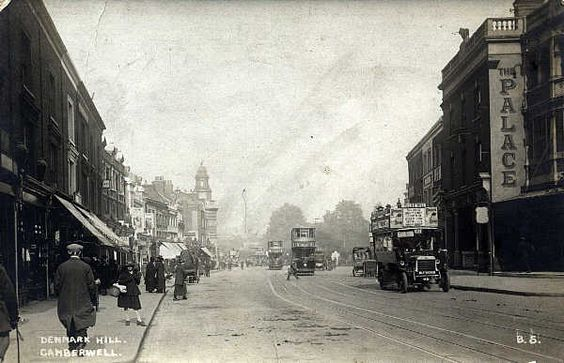
Denmark Hill in 1905

The area is home of the Maudsley Hospital and King's College Hospital, and also of Ruskin Park, named after John Ruskin, who once lived nearby. The preface to his work Unto This Last is dated "Denmark Hill, 10th May, 1862". The Institute of Psychiatry is based behind the Maudsley Hospital, a school of King's College London (University of London). The college also has a hall of residence immediately east at Champion Hill.

The Salvation Army's William Booth Memorial Training College on Champion Park which was designed by Giles Gilbert Scott was completed in 1932; it towers over south London. It has a similar monumental impressiveness to Gilbert Scott's other south London buildings, Battersea Power Station and Bankside Power Station (now housing Tate Modern), although its simplicity is partly the result of repeated budget cuts during its construction: much more detail, including carved Gothic stonework surrounding the windows, was originally planned.

Shepherd's Bush F.C. played in the area as Old St Stephen's F.C.

== Geography ==
Its postcode is SE5. North-east and south-easterly slopes of the same eminence are named Grove Hill and Dog Kennel Hill, on top of which the summit is shared with Champion Hill, the only division being proximity to the respective two affluent streets which intersect on Camberwell descent. From Camberwell Green northwards the land is much lower and very gently sloped as in northern Brixton at its other foot, in the west. There are good views across central London from vantage points (e.g. top-storey windows). On a clear day some viewers can read the time on the Big Ben clockface.

== Transport ==
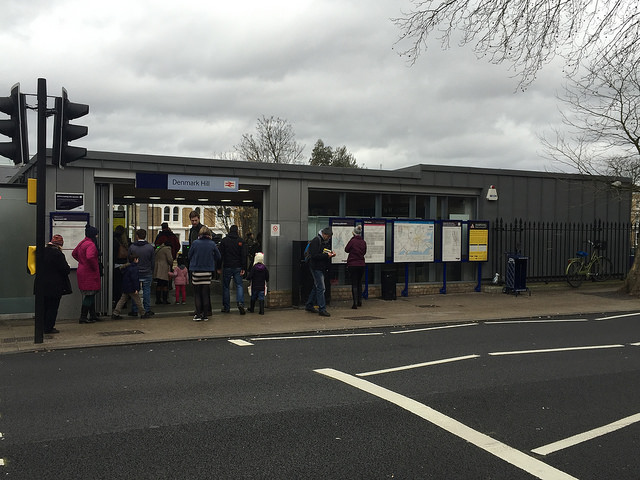
Denmark Hill station entrance

Denmark Hill has a major transport interchange served by London Overground, Southeastern and Thameslink rail services and London Buses.

=== Rail ===
Denmark Hill railway station is served by Southeastern services to London Victoria via Bexleyheath and Dartford via Bexleyheath. London Overground also provides services to Highbury & Islington and Clapham Junction. Thameslink operate services to London Blackfriars and Sevenoaks and Orpington.

=== Buses ===
Denmark Hill is served by many Transport for London bus services connecting it with areas including Central London, Croydon, Norwood, Dulwich, Peckham and Penge.

== Sites of interest ==
=== Ruskin Park ===
Ruskin Park is a public park at the centre of the long curved slope and half of crest summit area which is Denmark Hill. It was opened on 2 February 1907 with 24 acres (9.7 ha) and in 1910 a further 12 acres (4.9 ha) were added on the south side of the park. It is named after John Ruskin (1819–1900), who lived near the park. The source of the Earl's Sluice river, now underground, is in the park.

=== Weston Education Centre ===
The Weston Education Centre, with its medical library, is in Denmark Hill.

== Notable people ==
Among those who were born or lived in Denmark Hill are:

- Samuel Prout (1783–1852), artist
- Sir Henry Bessemer (1813–1898), inventor
- John Belcher (1841–1913), architect
- Philip Mainwaring Johnston (1865–1936), architect
- John Cyril Porte (1884–1919), aviator
- Arthur Vigers (1890–1968), flying ace
- Albert Houthuesen (1903–1979) artist
- Catherine Dean (1905–1983), artist
- Stan Tracey (1926–2013), jazz pianist and composer
- Danny Kirwan (1950–2018), guitarist of Fleetwood Mac from 1968 to 1972
- Lorraine Chase (b. 1951), actress
- Jenny Agutter (b. 1952), actress
- Jeremy Bowen, BBC News reporter
- Jenny Eclair (b. 1960), comedian/writer
- Lord Nicholas Windsor (b. 1970), member of the Royal Family
- Rio Ferdinand (b. 1978), footballer
- Cush Jumbo (b. 1985), actress
- Jerkcurb (b. 1992), musician
- Myles Lewis-Skelly (b. 2006), footballer

== See also ==
- Champion Hill
- Herne Hill
- Norwood Ridge
- Roller Hockey
