= Ruskin Park =

Park in London Borough of Lambeth

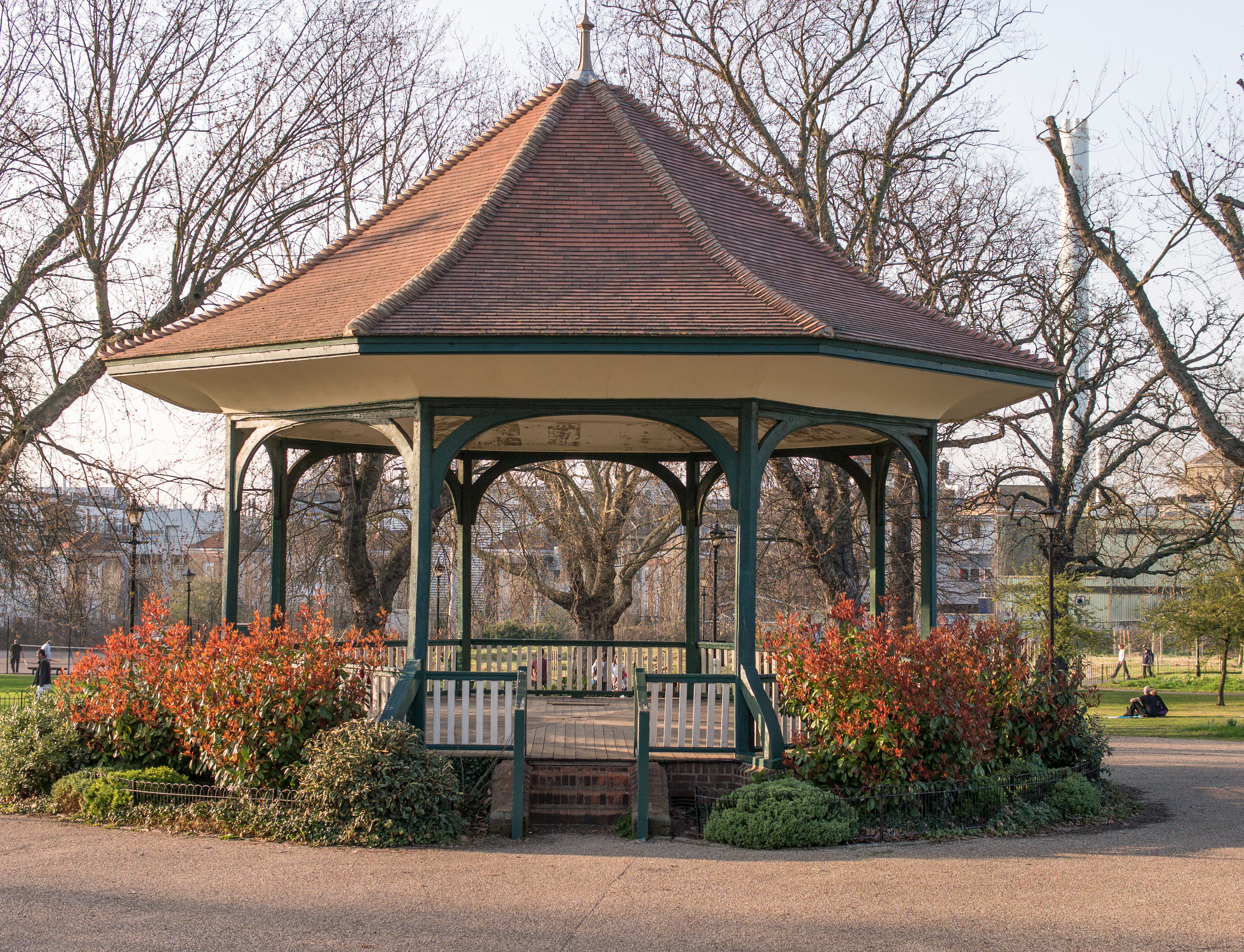
- Bandstand

- Location within Greater London Location within the United Kingdom
- Type: Public park
- Location: Denmark Hill, Lambeth, London SE5, England
- Coordinates: 51°27′53″N 0°05′37″W
- Area: 36 acres (15 ha)
- Created: 2 February 1907; 119 years ago
- Status: Open all year

Ruskin Park is a park in the London Borough of Lambeth, London, England, close to Camberwell, Loughborough Junction and Herne Hill.

== History ==
At the start of the 20th century local residents successfully campaigned for a new public park on 24 acres of land on Denmark Hill, and it opened to the public on 2 February 1907. The park was laid out by the notable parks designer Lt-Col J. J. Sexby. Sexby's design included an Old English Garden, an oval duck pond, a bandstand and a bowling green. The bowling green has been replaced by a garden, but the other features remain. In 1910 Ruskin Park was enlarged by the addition of a further 12 acres (5 ha) to the south west.

The existing houses on the site were demolished when the park was created. One of these was Dane House, where, in 1842, Felix Mendelssohn composed Spring Song. There is a sundial in the park commemorating Mendelssohn's visit. The former entrance porch to one of the demolished houses remains in the park, and is Grade II listed.

The park is named after John Ruskin (1819–1900), a poet, writer and a major champion of diverse green spaces as well as of the Arts and Crafts movement, who lived nearby from 1823 to 1871. He gives his name equally to a university, college, museum and square.

During World War I, recruits of the 21st Battalion, London Regiment (First Surrey Rifles) based at nearby Flodden Road in Camberwell, trained in the park.

In 1967, the rock band Pink Floyd used Ruskin Park for their first official photoshoot.

== Facilities and features ==
It has a playground, nature area, tennis court, basketball court, football and cricket pitches, and pond.

There is a mural of a common toad on a wall in the park by street artist ATM, which was commissioned by the charity Froglife.

Ruskin Park is open from 7.00am to 15 minutes before sunset every day.
