= Forestdale, London =

Coordinates: 51.345°N 0.038°W

Forestdale
- Forestdale welcome sign

- Location within Greater London
- OS grid reference: TQ3762
- London borough: Croydon
- Ceremonial county: Greater London
- Region: London
- Country: England
- Sovereign state: United Kingdom
- Post town: CROYDON
- Postcode district: CR0
- Dialling code: 020
- Police: Metropolitan
- Fire: London
- Ambulance: London
- UK Parliament: Croydon East
- London Assembly: Croydon and Sutton

Forestdale is a residential neighbourhood of southeast London in the London Borough of Croydon. It is sometimes considered to be part of Addington, its ancient and ecclesiastical parish. It is located south of Upper Shirley, east of Selsdon, south-west of Addington's historic centre, north-west of New Addington and north of Farleigh and is east of West Wickham.

== Geography ==
Forestdale has public green verges and a nature reserve with diverse walks. Adjoining are Addington and Croydon's closest golf courses. Forestdale is linked to Croydon via Addington by Featherbed Lane and is also linked towards Croydon or Orpington via West Wickham which skirts the suburb on one side.

The suburb consists of cul-de-sacs running off four main roads, the cul-de-sacs being subdivided into several 'neighbourhoods'. All houses within a cul-de-sac are of the same style, but differ from other cul-de-sacs in style and materials, such as weatherboarding, brick colour and arrangement, and so uniformity of style is achieved within one cul-de-sac but differs from the others.

Forestdale contains a community centre (The Forum) on Pixton Way. There is a small row of shops at the junction of Featherbed Lane and Selsdon Park Road, which contains a pub (The Forestdale Arms). The fish & chip shop here (McDermott's) was voted the best in London and the South-East in 2005.

== History ==
Most homes were built here between the late 1960s and mid 1970s on previously open ground containing a number of smallholdings. Wates Group, a construction firm heavily involved in many of the homes' construction, won an award in 1972 due to the solar heating panels they installed in three of the houses.

== Transport ==
Two London Buses serve the village; routes 353 and 433

All parts of Forestdale are within a mile of Tramlink tram stops:

- Fieldway
- Addington
- Gravel Hill, which is also connected via the buses.

Nearest Stations

All parts of Forestdale are within a mile of these following National Railway Stations:

- West Wickham railway station located two miles east of Forestdale which is connected by bus routes that serve the Forestdale area.
- South Croydon located three miles north of Forestdale.
- Sanderstead railway station located three miles south west of Forestdale.

== Education ==
Primary Education

- Courtwood Primary School
- Forestdale Primary School

== Notable people ==
- Rachel Chinouriri, singer

== Gallery ==
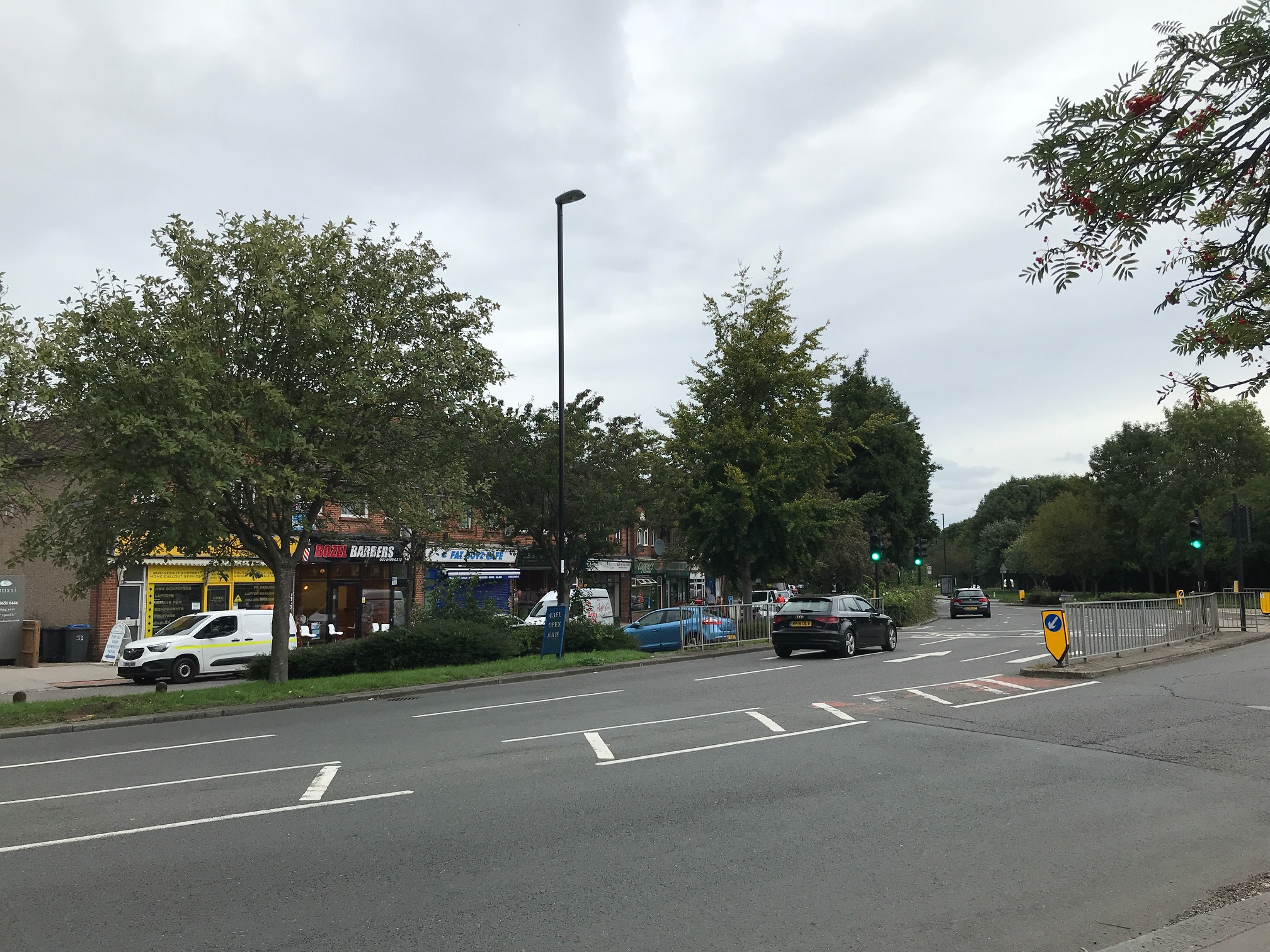
Shops on Selsdon Park Road

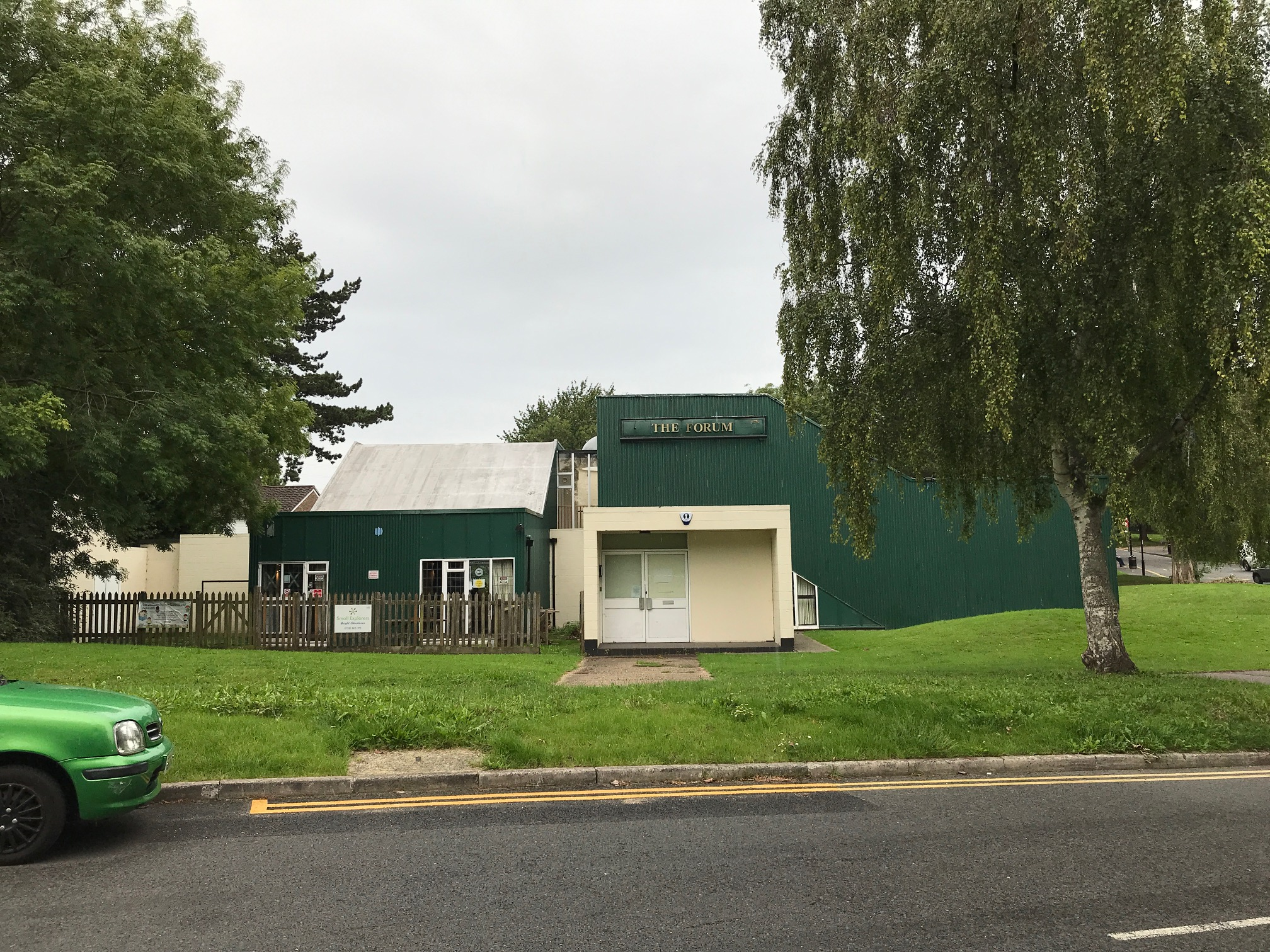
The Forum

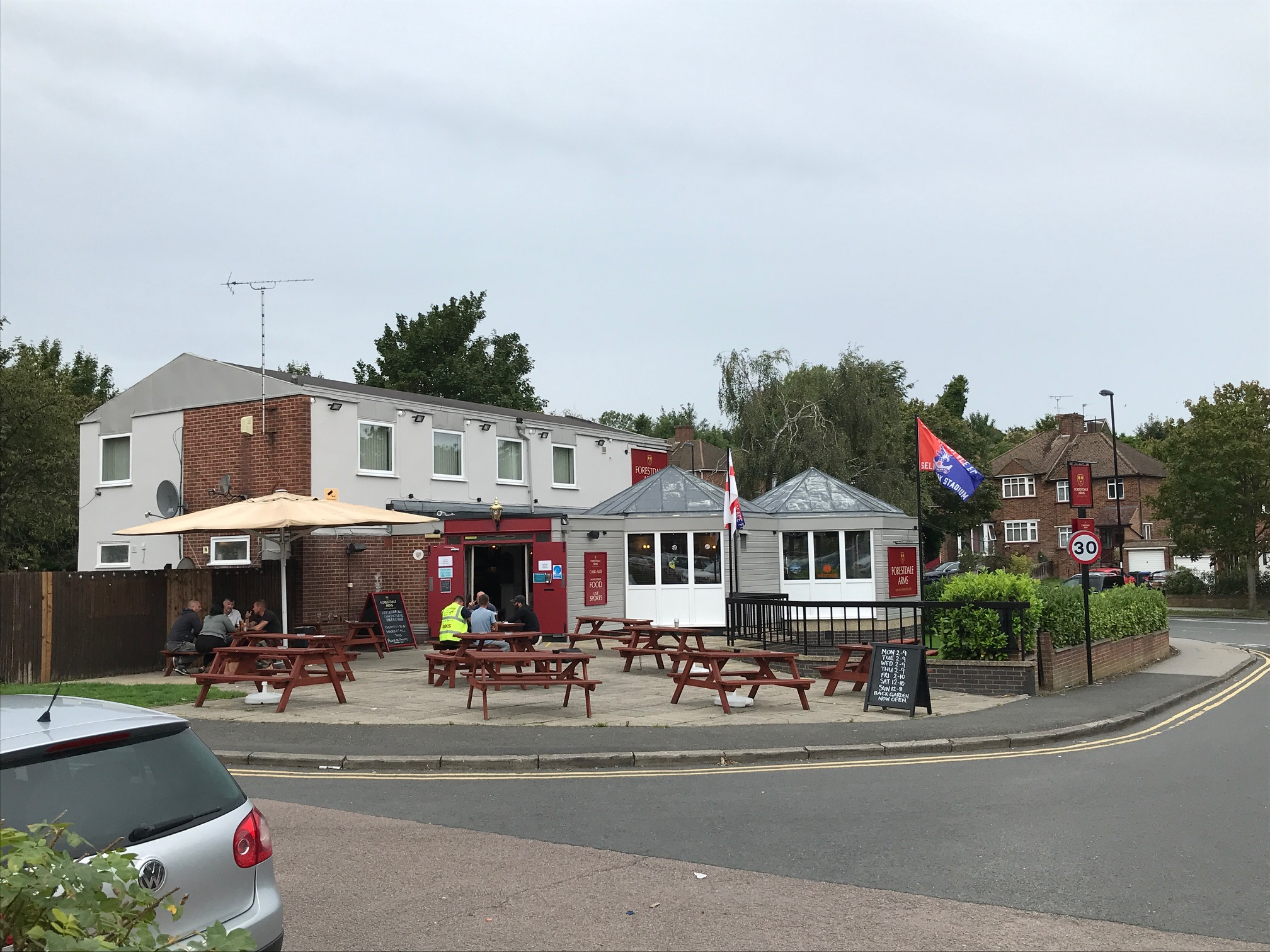
The Forestdale Arms pub

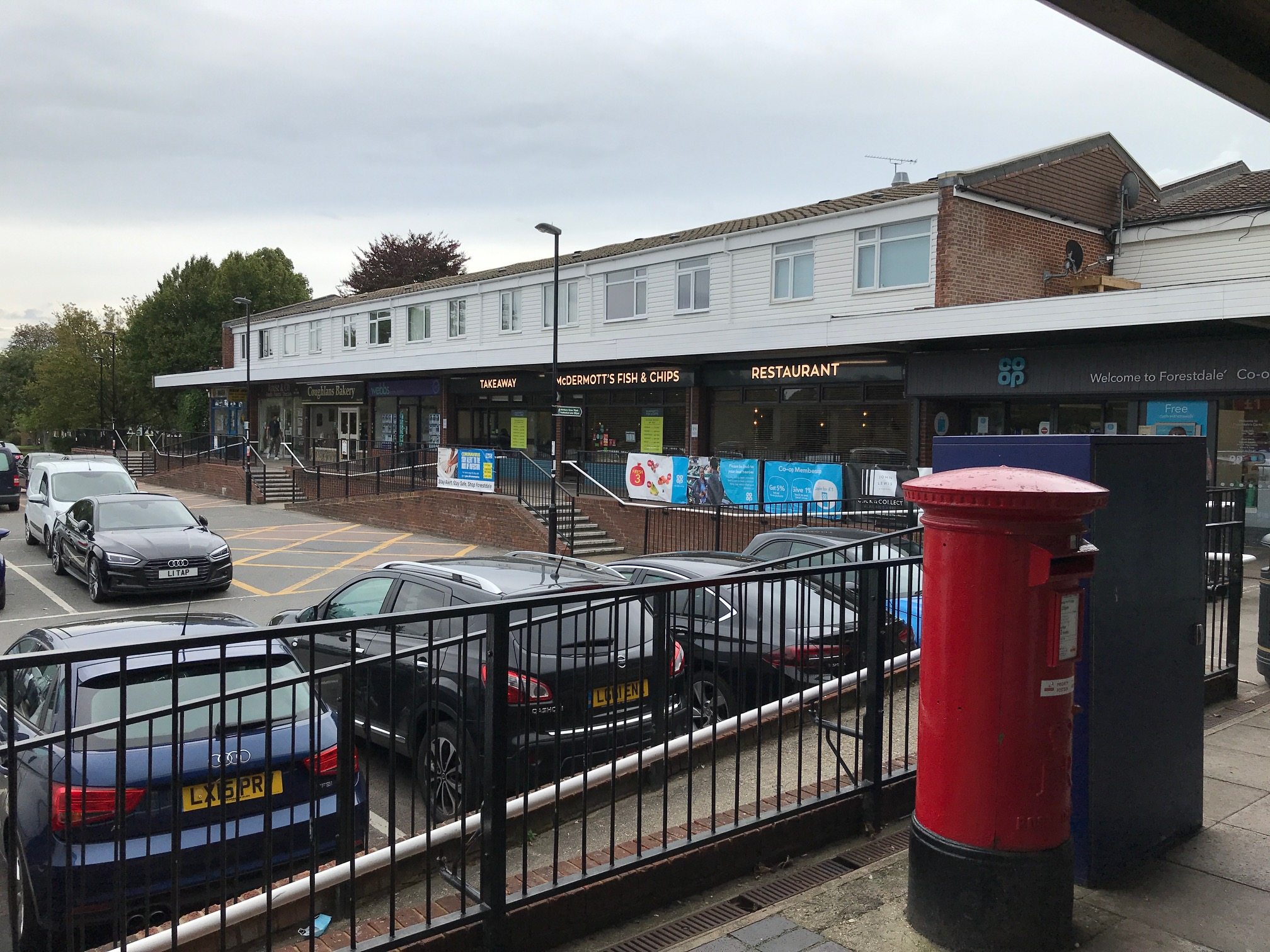
Forestdale Shopping Centre

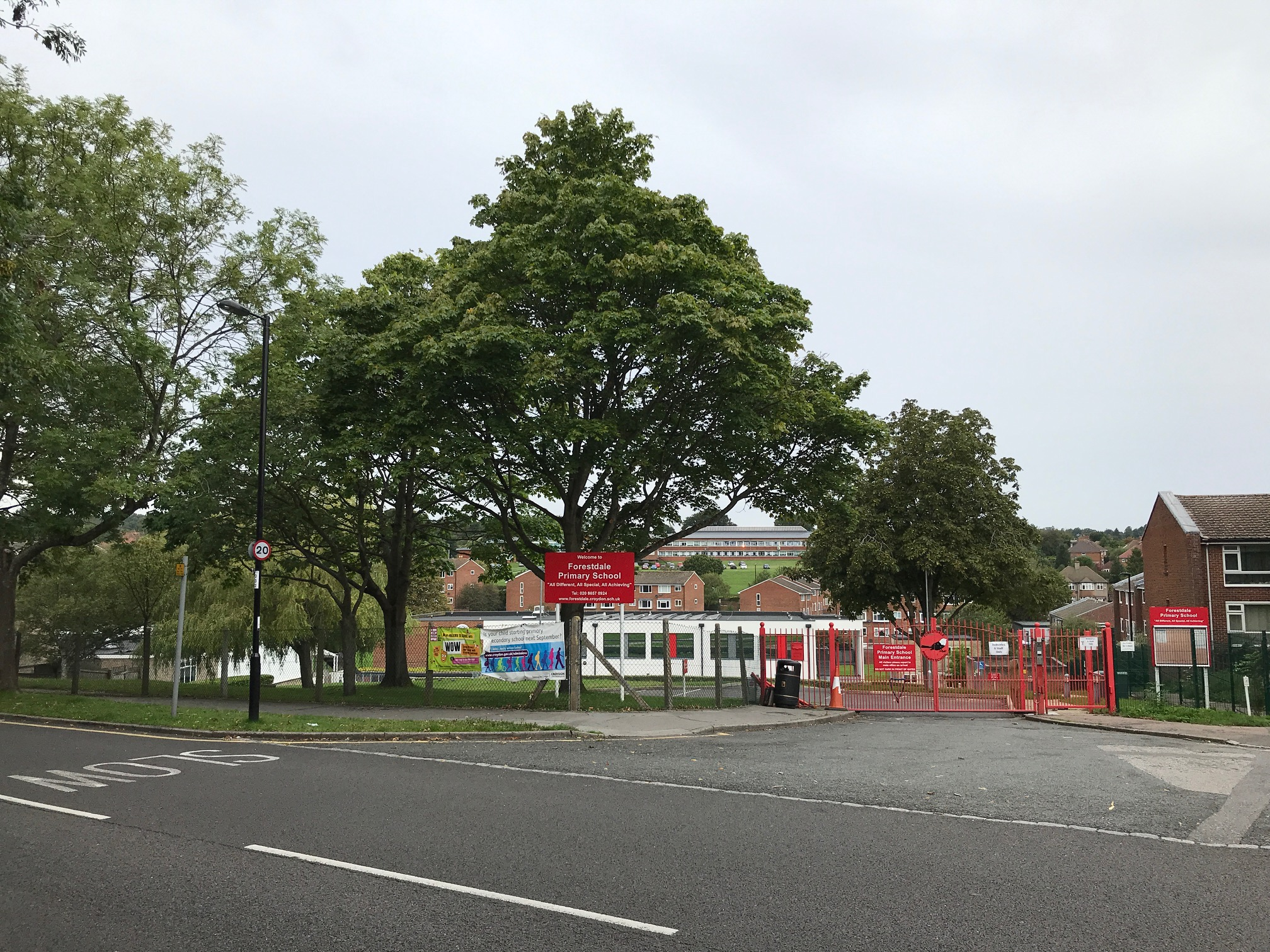
Forestdale Primary School

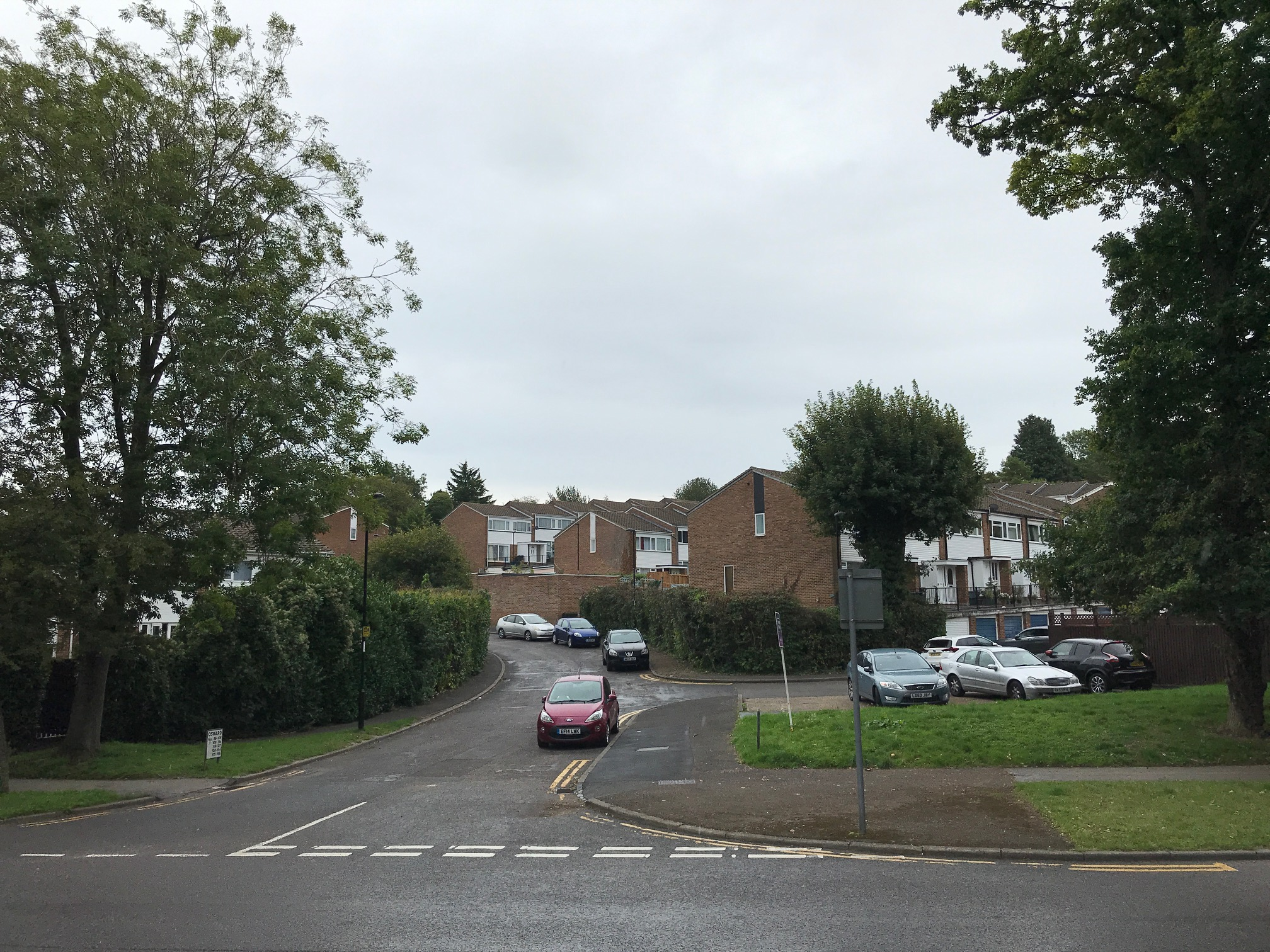
Typical housing in Forestdale
