= South Circular Road, London =

Major road in south London, England

Coordinates: 51.4405°N 0.1098°W

South Circular Road

- The South Circular Road in Greater London, with the North Circular Road and Woolwich Ferry. A205 road A2204 road to Woolwich Ferry

Route information
- Length: 20.5 mi (33.0 km)

Major junctions
- East end: Woolwich
- Woolwich Ferry; A2 (Rochester Way Relief Road); A20 (Sidcup Road); A21 (Bromley Road); A23 (Streatham Hill); A24 (Balham Hill); A3 (West Hill); A316 (Lower Richmond Road); M4; A4 (Great West Road); A406 (North Circular Road)
- West end: South Ealing

Location
- Country: United Kingdom
- Constituent country: England

Road network
- Roads in the United Kingdom; Motorways; A and B road zones

The South Circular Road (formally the A205 and often simply called the South Circular) in south London, England, is a major road that runs from the Woolwich Ferry in the east to the Chiswick Flyover in the west via Eltham, Lee Green, Catford, Forest Hill, Dulwich, Tulse Hill, Streatham Hill, Clapham Common, Clapham Junction, Wandsworth, Putney, Barnes, Mortlake and Kew Bridge. Together with the North Circular Road and Woolwich Ferry, it makes a complete ring-road around Central London and is a former boundary of the Ultra Low Emission Zone. The South Circular is largely a sequence of urban streets joined together, requiring several at-grade turns, unlike the mostly purpose-made carriageways of the North Circular. As a result, it is frequently congested.

Originally planned as a new-build route across South London, construction of the first section of the South Circular near Eltham began in 1921 to a high-quality specification. The remainder of the road was supposed to be of a similar standard but it was repeatedly delayed, and the current route was allocated in the late 1930s to existing urban streets instead. Despite several proposals to either upgrade the road or replace it with a parallel motorway, there has been little change since the route was first planned and most of the road is still urban streets.

== Route ==
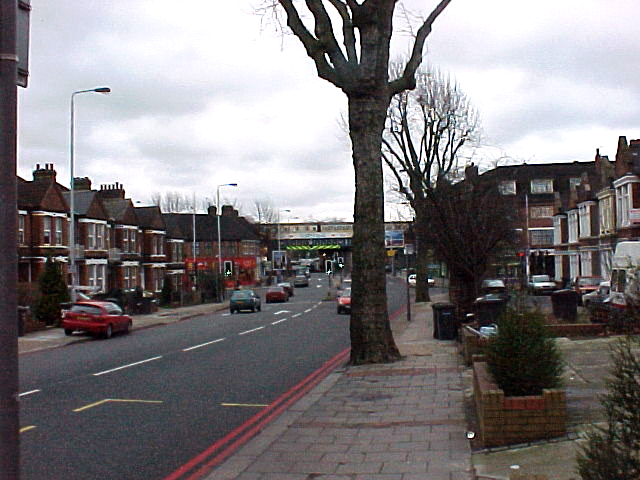
Brownhill Road in Catford

The South Circular is 20.5 miles (33.0 km) long. The majority of the road is single carriageway, one lane each way, aside from a small section of dual carriageway near the Woolwich Ferry. It is a primary road for its entire length. The route runs closer to central London compared to the more distant North Circular.

=== Woolwich–Clapham ===
The South Circular Road starts just south of the ferry terminal where the A2204 Ferry Approach meets the main east–west road through Woolwich, the A206. It heads south, climbing up John Wilson Street, a section of dual carriageway, until it meets Grand Depot Road and becomes single carriageway through Woolwich Common and Academy Road past the former Royal Military Academy. The route continues south to the A2 at a grade-separated junction—one of only two on the route—and continues southwesterly as a dual carriageway, crossing Eltham Road (A210) and Sidcup Road (A20). At the junction with Burnt Ash Hill the road becomes urban single carriageway again, which it remains the case for most of the remainder of the route.

The first section of the single carriageway is Saint Mildreds Road; then, shortly after passing under the railway line, it is Brownhill Road due west all the way to the Catford gyratory system which crosses the A21 to follow Catford Road past the former Catford Stadium, and a medley of suburban roads towards Forest Hill and Horniman Museum, Dulwich Common and Dulwich College, Tulse Hill and Brixton Hill to Clapham Common.

=== Clapham–Kew ===
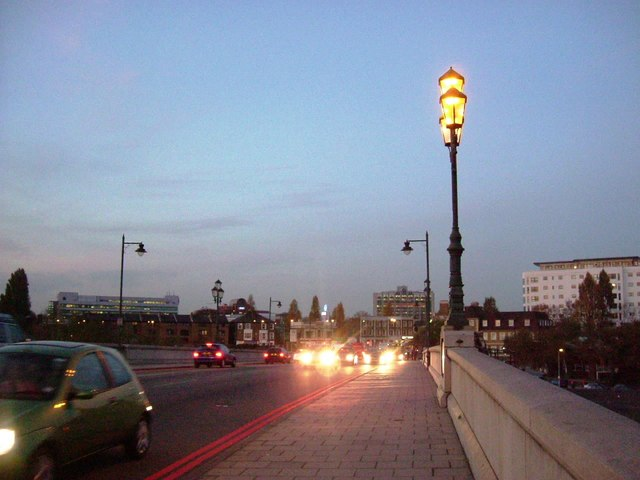
Kew Bridge is near the western end of the South Circular.

Beyond the common, the South Circular merges with the A3 London to Portsmouth road for two miles, travelling along Wandsworth High Street and passing the old Ram Brewery. At West Hill the routes diverge, with the A205 going north-west along Upper Richmond Road, past Putney Leisure Centre and the south end of Barnes Common and the home ground of Rosslyn Park F.C., then along Upper Richmond Road West, before turning north at East Sheen onto Clifford Avenue.

The road then crosses the A316 Great Chertsey Road, passing the National Archives, Kew Green, and over Kew Bridge. It ends at the Chiswick Roundabout, which is the junction for the M4 and the A406 North Circular Road.

== History ==
=== Early plans ===
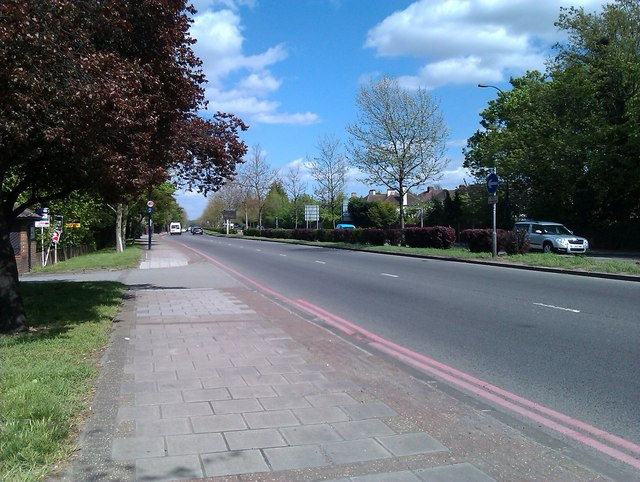
A short part of the South Circular Road is a relatively fast dual carriageway road. Early 20th century plans called for the entire route to be this standard.

The South Circular Road was planned by the Ministry of Transport in the early 20th century as part of a general programme of traffic improvements across London. In 1903, a proposal for new approach roads was submitted to the Royal Commission on London Traffic, but was rejected. The Road Board was formed in 1910 to address traffic issues, which led to the London Arterial Road Conferences in 1913–14 that revived the earlier plans. Progress was halted because of the war, but resumed in 1920, when it was hoped it would find work for demobilised soldiers.

The first section near Woolwich was under construction by 1921, as it ran on open land that was easy to purchase, but plans for the remainder of the route had not yet been decided and there were delays due to compulsory purchasing of properties. In 1925, The Times announced a replacement bridge for the Woolwich Ferry was planned as part of the South Circular project to tie in with the East Ham and Barking Bypass (now the A13). A significant amount of new housing had been built along the route of the South Circular since the original 1903 plans, and building costs had risen because of labour and because of further demolition required. In 1927, the Governors of Dulwich College formally objected to the road as it would put the Memorial Library right next to a main road and remove part of the college green.

A short section from Well Hall Road to Eltham Road had been completed by 1930, aside from a bridge underneath the Hither Green – Dartford railway, and the road had been built as far west as Burnt Ash Hill by the middle of the decade. Sir Charles Bressey's Highway Development Survey (also known as the Bressey Report), published in 1937, showed a 15-mile (24 km)-long South Circular that would have a new-build section near Wandsworth Bridge (then being rebuilt) but otherwise be a series of online improvements to existing roads.

=== Abercrombie redevelopment ===
Sir Patrick Abercrombie was frustrated by the lack of progress, and in 1933 said "There is not a single complete Ring Road in the County or Region of London". Plans for an improved South Circular were revisited as part of Abercrombie's County of London Plan of 1943, as the southern half of one of several ring roads around the capital. Abercrombie designated it as the "C Ring" (the third ring out from the city centre); however, the high-quality road was never built and the semi-circular route was assigned to existing roads through the southern suburbs; these roads retain their historic names. The current recognised route of the South Circular was created by local motoring organisations putting up strategically placed signposts to direct traffic. Sir Richard Sharples, then MP for Sutton and Cheam, felt this was inadequate and complained that "I do not think that the South Circular Road could be said to exist at all."

=== Ringway 2 ===
In the 1960s, Abercrombie's plans were revived by the Greater London Council (GLC) as the London Ringways Plan which proposed the construction of a series of motorways in and around London to control traffic congestion. The existing South Circular route was recognised as being unsuitable for upgrading and a new motorway, Ringway 2, was planned for construction further south.

Because of the destruction required and cost involved in the proposed plans the majority of the Ringway Plans had stagnated by 1973. However, local Members of Parliament (MPs), including Toby Jessel, MP for Twickenham, complained the project should not be cancelled, as the existing South Circular was completely unacceptable to traffic. The plans were scrapped after Labour won the GLC election that year.

=== Later plans ===
In 1985, the London Chamber of Commerce and Industry proposed a £300m partial replacement for the South Circular that would have seen a dual-carriageway built over existing suburban railway lines between Barnes and Wandsworth Bridge, and Wandsworth Common to Nine Elms. The Government announced a large-scale upgrade of the South Circular in the 1989 white paper Roads for Prosperity, but it was cancelled the following year after a petition signed by 3,500 local residents. In addition to the proposed property demolition around Tulse Hill, the petition complained that the road's course conveniently avoided a house belonging to then-Prime Minister Margaret Thatcher half a mile away.

== Traffic ==
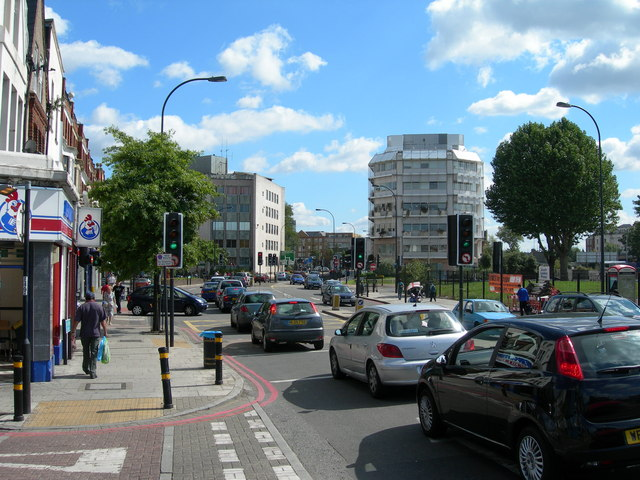
The South Circular Road near Catford suffers from regular traffic congestion, despite being a red route.

The South Circular Road has long been the target of criticism over its poor capacity and lack of improvement schemes. MPs have dismissed the road as "a collection of signposts" and "not so much a coherent through route". In 1969, the chairman of the Greater London Council planning and transportation committee called the South Circular "a joke". Two years later, Jessel reported that it could take over an hour to travel the route end to end, a little over 20 miles.

The whole of the South Circular is a red route; this status is allocated to roads that together make up over 30% of traffic in London. This prohibits any stopping or loading. Some sections of the road through the borough of Lewisham have extensive bus lanes. Their appearance is controversial; a 2006 resident survey produced mixed results, with people either believing there were too many or that there were not enough.

In 1988, a single road closure (resulting from a gas leak on a side road in Wandsworth) caused severe congestion along the entire South Circular. A representative from Scotland Yard's Central Communications complex said the inadequate design of the road was indicative of several single points of failure in the London road network.

The South Circular has been criticised for its poor air quality and pollution. This affects drivers, cyclists and pedestrians, all of whom travel along the road. A 2007 report in the Daily Telegraph said it was the eighth worst road in Britain. In December 2020, pollution from the South Circular was ruled to be a factor in the death of 9 year old Ella Roberta Kissi-Debrah.

== ULEZ ==
On 25 October 2021, the South Circular became the boundary of the London Ultra Low Emission Zone (ULEZ), although it is not included in it. Vehicles travelling inside the zone and not meeting key exhaust emission standards will need to pay a daily charge of £12.50 for cars, vans and motorcycles, and £100 for coaches, HGVs and buses. The zone expanded beyond this to cover the whole of Greater London on 29 August 2023.

== Future ==
A task force was set up in July 2013 by the Mayor of London Boris Johnson to look at improvements to the London road network, including the South Circular and North Circular. The plans included putting the road in a series of tunnels. This would free up space on the surface, providing public space and extensive cycle routes and improving the linkage of existing communities currently severed by the busy road. Caroline Pidgeon, deputy chair of the London Assembly's Transport Committee, responded, "It doesn't make sense and it won't add up – [there's a] £30bn estimate, but I'm sure it'll cost at least double that, and the reality is we'll lose homes around these roads and so on."

As part of the Superloop network, Transport for London plan to run an express bus route along the South Circular, extending from Clapham Junction railway station to Eltham railway station, and using the A205 between Clapham Common and Well Hall. A consultation opened in October 2025 with the intention that buses start operating in 2026.

== See also ==
- A roads in Zone 2 of the Great Britain numbering scheme
