= Woodbridge =

Woodbridge may refer to:

== Places ==
=== Australia ===
- Woodbridge, Western Australia formerly called West Midland
- Woodbridge, Tasmania

=== Canada ===
- Woodbridge, Ontario

=== England ===
- Woodbridge, Suffolk, the location of
  - Woodbridge Rural District, a former district of East Suffolk
  - Woodbridge (UK Parliament constituency), 1885–1950
  - Woodbridge School
  - RAF Woodbridge
- Woodbridge High School, Redbridge
- Woodbridge, Devon
- Woodbridge, Dorset
- Woodbridge, Gloucestershire, a location
- Woodbridge, Northumberland, a location

=== United States ===
- Woodbridge, California
- Woodbridge, Irvine, California
- Woodbridge, Connecticut
- Woodbridge Township, New Jersey
- Woodbridge (CDP), New Jersey
- Woodbridge, Virginia
- Woodbridge, Dallas, Texas, a neighborhood
- Woodbridge, Detroit

== Other uses ==
- Woodbridge (plantation), formerly in Prince William County, Virginia, US
- Woodbridge (surname)
- The Woodbridge Company
- Woodbridge's Regiment of Militia, a Massachusetts regiment in the American Revolutionary War
- Woodbridge wine, made by Robert Mondavi (now part of Constellation Brands)
- Institute of Mental Health (Singapore), also known by its former name as Woodbridge Hospital
- Justice Woodbridge (disambiguation)

== See also ==
- Woodbridge Hall (disambiguation)
- Woodbridge High School (disambiguation)
- Woodbridge station (disambiguation), train stations of the name
- Woodbridge Township (disambiguation)
- Woodenbridge, a village in the Republic of Ireland
- Woodridge (disambiguation)
