= List of United Kingdom locations: Wir-Wood =

The United Kingdom

This is part of the list of United Kingdom locations: a gazetteer of place names in the United Kingdom showing each place's locality and geographical coordinates.

== Wi (continued) ==
=== Wir–Wis ===
Location	Locality	Coordinates (links to map & photo sources)	OS grid reference
Wirksworth	Derbyshire	53.07°N 01.58°W	SK2853
Wirksworth Moor	Derbyshire	53.08°N 01.55°W	SK3054
Wirswall	Cheshire	52.99°N 02.68°W	SJ5444
Wisbech	Cambridgeshire	52.65°N 00.15°E	TF4609
Wisbech St Mary	Cambridgeshire	52.65°N 00.09°E	TF4208
Wisborough Green	West Sussex	51.02°N 00.51°W	TQ0426
Wiseton	Nottinghamshire	53.39°N 00.93°W	SK7189
Wishanger	Gloucestershire	51.77°N 02.11°W	SO9209
Wishaw	North Lanarkshire	55.77°N 03.93°W	NS7955
Wishaw	Warwickshire	52.54°N 01.75°W	SP1794
Wisley	Surrey	51.32°N 00.48°W	TQ0659
Wispington	Lincolnshire	53.22°N 00.20°W	TF2071
Wissenden	Kent	51.13°N 00.71°E	TQ9041
Wissett	Suffolk	52.35°N 01.46°E	TM3679
Wistanstow	Shropshire	52.46°N 02.84°W	SO4385
Wistanswick	Shropshire	52.84°N 02.50°W	SJ6628
Wistaston	Cheshire	53.07°N 02.47°W	SJ6853
Wistaston Green	Cheshire	53.08°N 02.47°W	SJ6854
Wiston	Pembrokeshire	51.82°N 04.87°W	SN0218
Wiston	South Lanarkshire	55.57°N 03.66°W	NS9532
Wiston	West Sussex	50.91°N 00.37°W	TQ1414
Wiston Mains	South Lanarkshire	55.56°N 03.66°W	NS9531
Wistow	Cambridgeshire	52.40°N 00.13°W	TL2780
Wistow	Leicestershire	52.54°N 01.05°W	SP6495
Wistow	North Yorkshire	53.80°N 01.10°W	SE5935
Wiswell	Lancashire	53.82°N 02.39°W	SD7437

=== Wit ===
Location	Locality	Coordinates (links to map & photo sources)	OS grid reference
Witcham	Cambridgeshire	52.38°N 00.14°E	TL4679
Witchampton	Dorset	50.85°N 02.02°W	ST9806
Witchford	Cambridgeshire	52.37°N 00.20°E	TL5078
Witcombe	Somerset	50.98°N 02.75°W	ST4721
Withacott	Devon	50.91°N 04.23°W	SS4315
Witham	Essex	51.79°N 00.62°E	TL8114
Witham Friary	Somerset	51.16°N 02.37°W	ST7441
Witham on the Hill	Lincolnshire	52.73°N 00.44°W	TF0516
Withcall	Lincolnshire	53.32°N 00.07°W	TF2883
Withdean	Brighton and Hove	50.84°N 00.15°W	TQ3007
Witherenden Hill	East Sussex	51.01°N 00.33°E	TQ6426
Withergate	Norfolk	52.79°N 01.39°E	TG2927
Witheridge	Devon	50.91°N 03.70°W	SS8014
Witheridge Hill	Oxfordshire	51.55°N 01.00°W	SU6984
Witherley	Leicestershire	52.57°N 01.52°W	SP3297
Withermarsh Green	Suffolk	51.99°N 00.92°E	TM0137
Withern	Lincolnshire	53.31°N 00.14°E	TF4382
Withernsea	East Riding of Yorkshire	53.72°N 00.02°E	TA3427
Withernwick	East Riding of Yorkshire	53.84°N 00.19°W	TA1940
Withersdale Street	Suffolk	52.38°N 01.33°E	TM2781
Withersdane	Kent	51.16°N 00.93°E	TR0545
Withersfield	Suffolk	52.09°N 00.40°E	TL6547
Witherslack	Cumbria	54.24°N 02.87°W	SD4384
Witherwack	Sunderland	54.92°N 01.42°W	NZ3759
Withial	Somerset	51.12°N 02.61°W	ST5736
Withiel	Cornwall	50.45°N 04.83°W	SW9965
Withiel Florey	Somerset	51.08°N 03.45°W	SS9833
Withielgoose	Cornwall	50.45°N 04.81°W	SX0065
Withielgoose Mills	Cornwall	50.45°N 04.81°W	SX0065
Withington	Gloucestershire	51.83°N 01.95°W	SP0315
Withington	Herefordshire	52.08°N 02.64°W	SO5643
Withington	Manchester	53.42°N 02.22°W	SJ8592
Withington	Shropshire	52.71°N 02.63°W	SJ5713
Withington	Staffordshire	52.91°N 01.95°W	SK0335
Withington Green	Cheshire	53.23°N 02.30°W	SJ8071
Withington Marsh	Herefordshire	52.09°N 02.65°W	SO5544
Withleigh	Devon	50.89°N 03.56°W	SS9012
Withnell	Lancashire	53.69°N 02.56°W	SD6322
Withnell Fold	Lancashire	53.70°N 02.59°W	SD6123
Withybed Green	Worcestershire	52.34°N 01.98°W	SP0172
Withybrook	Somerset	51.22°N 02.50°W	ST6547
Withybrook	Warwickshire	52.45°N 01.36°W	SP4384
Withybush	Pembrokeshire	51.81°N 04.96°W	SM9617
Withycombe	Somerset	51.15°N 03.41°W	ST0141
Withycombe Raleigh	Devon	50.62°N 03.40°W	SY0181
Withyditch	Bath and North East Somerset	51.32°N 02.43°W	ST7059
Withyham	East Sussex	51.09°N 00.12°E	TQ4935
Withy Mills	Bath and North East Somerset	51.31°N 02.48°W	ST6657
Withymoor Village	Dudley	52.47°N 02.13°W	SO9186
Withypool	Somerset	51.10°N 03.65°W	SS8435
Withystakes	Staffordshire	53.02°N 02.07°W	SJ9548
Withywood	North Somerset	51.40°N 02.61°W	ST5767
Witley	Surrey	51.14°N 00.65°W	SU9439
Witnells End	Worcestershire	52.42°N 02.31°W	SO7981
Witnesham	Suffolk	52.10°N 01.18°E	TM1850
Witney	Oxfordshire	51.77°N 01.49°W	SP3509
Wittensford	Hampshire	50.91°N 01.60°W	SU2813
Wittering	Cambridgeshire	52.60°N 00.45°W	TF0502
Wittersham	Kent	51.01°N 00.69°E	TQ8927
Witton	Birmingham	52.51°N 01.88°W	SP0891
Witton	Norfolk	52.62°N 01.41°E	TG3109
Witton	Worcestershire	52.25°N 02.16°W	SO8962
Witton Bridge	Norfolk	52.82°N 01.47°E	TG3431
Witton Gilbert	Durham	54.80°N 01.64°W	NZ2346
Witton Hill	Worcestershire	52.24°N 02.35°W	SO7661
Witton-le-Wear	Durham	54.67°N 01.78°W	NZ1431
Witton Park	Durham	54.66°N 01.73°W	NZ1730
Wiveliscombe	Somerset	51.03°N 03.31°W	ST0827
Wivelrod	Hampshire	51.13°N 01.04°W	SU6738
Wivelsfield	East Sussex	50.96°N 00.09°W	TQ3420
Wivelsfield Green	East Sussex	50.96°N 00.07°W	TQ3520
Wivenhoe	Essex	51.85°N 00.96°E	TM0422
Wiveton	Norfolk	52.94°N 01.03°E	TG0443

=== Wix ===
Location	Locality	Coordinates (links to map & photo sources)	OS grid reference
Wix	Essex	51.90°N 01.13°E	TM1628
Wixams	Bedford	52.08°N 00.47°E	TL046443
Wixford	Warwickshire	52.18°N 01.88°W	SP0854
Wixhill	Shropshire	52.84°N 02.65°W	SJ5628
Wixoe	Suffolk	52.05°N 00.49°E	TL7142

== Wo ==
=== Woa – Woob ===
Location	Locality	Coordinates (links to map & photo sources)	OS grid reference
Woburn	Bedfordshire	51.98°N 00.63°W	SP9433
Woburn Sands	Milton Keynes	52.00°N 00.66°W	SP9235
Wofferwood Common	Herefordshire	52.15°N 02.45°W	SO6951
Woking	Surrey	51.31°N 00.56°W	TQ0058
Wokingham	Berkshire	51.40°N 00.85°W	SU8068
Wolborough	Devon	50.51°N 03.62°W	SX8570
Woldhurst	West Sussex	50.80°N 00.75°W	SU8801
Woldingham	Surrey	51.28°N 00.03°W	TQ3756
Woldingham Garden Village	Surrey	51.28°N 00.05°W	TQ3656
Wold Newton	East Riding of Yorkshire	54.14°N 00.40°W	TA0473
Wold Newton	North East Lincolnshire	53.44°N 00.13°W	TF2496
Wolferd Green	Norfolk	52.54°N 01.31°E	TM2599
Wolferlow	Herefordshire	52.24°N 02.49°W	SO6661
Wolferton	Norfolk	52.82°N 00.44°E	TF6528
Wolfhampcote	Warwickshire	52.28°N 01.23°W	SP5265
Wolfhill	Perth and Kinross	56.48°N 03.38°W	NO1533
Wolf Rock	Cornwall	49.94°N 05.80°W	SW269119
Wolf's Castle	Pembrokeshire	51.89°N 04.98°W	SM9526
Wolfsdale	Pembrokeshire	51.84°N 05.00°W	SM9321
Wolfsdale Hill	Pembrokeshire	51.85°N 05.00°W	SM9322
Woll	Scottish Borders	55.48°N 02.85°W	NT4622
Wollaston	Northamptonshire	52.24°N 00.66°W	SP9162
Wollaston	Shropshire	52.70°N 03.00°W	SJ3212
Wollaston	Dudley	52.45°N 02.17°W	SO8884
Wollaton	Nottinghamshire	52.94°N 01.22°W	SK5239
Wollerton	Shropshire	52.86°N 02.56°W	SJ6230
Wollerton Wood	Shropshire	52.87°N 02.58°W	SJ6131
Wollescote	Dudley	52.44°N 02.11°W	SO9283
Wollrig	Scottish Borders	55.48°N 02.87°W	NT4522
Wolsingham	Durham	54.72°N 01.89°W	NZ0737
Wolstanton	Staffordshire	53.02°N 02.22°W	SJ8548
Wolstenholme	Rochdale	53.63°N 02.22°W	SD8515
Wolston	Warwickshire	52.37°N 01.39°W	SP4175
Wolsty	Cumbria	54.83°N 03.40°W	NY1050
Wolterton	Norfolk	52.83°N 01.20°E	TG1631
Wolvercote	Oxfordshire	51.77°N 01.30°W	SP4809
Wolverham	Cheshire	53.26°N 02.90°W	SJ4075
Wolverhampton	City of Wolverhampton	52.58°N 02.13°W	SO9198
Wolverley	Shropshire	52.87°N 02.78°W	SJ4731
Wolverley	Worcestershire	52.40°N 02.25°W	SO8379
Wolverstone	Devon	50.82°N 03.25°W	ST1204
Wolverton	Kent	51.13°N 01.22°E	TR2642
Wolverton	Milton Keynes	52.05°N 00.82°W	SP8140
Wolverton	Shropshire	52.47°N 02.79°W	SO4687
Wolverton	Warwickshire	52.25°N 01.70°W	SP2062
Wolverton	Wiltshire	51.07°N 02.31°W	ST7831
Wolverton Common	Hampshire	51.32°N 01.19°W	SU5659
Wolvesnewton	Monmouthshire	51.68°N 02.79°W	ST4599
Wolvey	Warwickshire	52.47°N 01.38°W	SP4287
Wolvey Heath	Warwickshire	52.48°N 01.36°W	SP4388
Wolviston	Stockton-on-Tees	54.61°N 01.30°W	NZ4525
Womaston	Powys	52.23°N 03.08°W	SO2660
Wombleton	North Yorkshire	54.23°N 00.97°W	SE6783
Wombourne	Staffordshire	52.52°N 02.19°W	SO8792
Wombridge	Shropshire	52.69°N 02.46°W	SJ6911
Wombwell	Barnsley	53.51°N 01.41°W	SE3902
Womenswold	Kent	51.20°N 01.17°E	TR2250
Womersley	North Yorkshire	53.66°N 01.19°W	SE5319
Wonderstone	Somerset	51.29°N 02.94°W	ST3456
Wonersh	Surrey	51.19°N 00.55°W	TQ0145
Wonford	Devon	50.71°N 03.50°W	SX9492
Wonson	Devon	50.68°N 03.88°W	SX6789
Wonston	Dorset	50.87°N 02.37°W	ST7408
Wonston	Hampshire	51.14°N 01.32°W	SU4739
Wooburn	Buckinghamshire	51.57°N 00.70°W	SU9087
Wooburn Common	Buckinghamshire	51.57°N 00.67°W	SU9287
Wooburn Green	Buckinghamshire	51.58°N 00.68°W	SU9188
Wooburn Moor	Buckinghamshire	51.60°N 00.68°W	SU9190

=== Wood ===
==== Wood – Woodh ====
Location	Locality	Coordinates (links to map & photo sources)	OS grid reference
Wood	Pembrokeshire	51.84°N 05.12°W	SM8521
Wood	Somerset	50.94°N 02.98°W	ST3117
Woodacott	Devon	50.83°N 04.30°W	SS3807
Woodacott Cross	Devon	50.83°N 04.30°W	SS3807
Woodale	North Yorkshire	54.20°N 01.97°W	SE0279
Woodbank	Cheshire	53.25°N 02.97°W	SJ3573
Woodbank	Shropshire	52.46°N 02.61°W	SO5885
Woodbastwick	Norfolk	52.68°N 01.44°E	TG3315
Woodbeck	Nottinghamshire	53.29°N 00.84°W	SK7778
Wood Bevington	Warwickshire	52.17°N 01.92°W	SP0553
Woodborough	Nottinghamshire	53.01°N 01.06°W	SK6347
Woodborough	Wiltshire	51.33°N 01.84°W	SU1159
Woodbridge	Devon	50.74°N 03.16°W	SY1895
Woodbridge	Dorset	50.96°N 02.21°W	ST8518
Woodbridge	Gloucestershire	51.82°N 01.95°W	SP0314
Woodbridge	Northumberland	55.18°N 01.56°W	NZ2888
Woodbridge	Suffolk	52.09°N 01.29°E	TM2649
Woodbridge Hill	Surrey	51.24°N 00.59°W	SU9850
Woodbridge Walk	Suffolk	52.05°N 01.42°E	TM3545
Wood Burcote	Northamptonshire	52.10°N 00.99°W	SP6946
Woodbury	Devon	50.67°N 03.40°W	SY0187
Woodbury Salterton	Devon	50.69°N 03.40°W	SY0189
Woodchester	Gloucestershire	51.71°N 02.23°W	SO8402
Woodchurch	Kent	51.07°N 00.76°E	TQ9434
Woodchurch	Wirral	53.37°N 03.08°W	SJ2887
Woodcock	Wiltshire	51.19°N 02.17°W	ST8844
Woodcock Heath	Staffordshire	52.85°N 01.92°W	SK0529
Woodcock Hill	Birmingham	52.42°N 01.98°W	SP0181
Woodcock Hill	Hillingdon	51.61°N 00.47°W	TQ0692
Woodcombe	Somerset	51.20°N 03.50°W	SS9546
Woodcot	Hampshire	50.82°N 01.19°W	SU5703
Woodcote	Croydon	51.33°N 00.13°W	TQ3061
Woodcote	Oxfordshire	51.52°N 01.07°W	SU6481
Woodcote	Shropshire	52.73°N 02.35°W	SJ7615
Woodcote	Surrey	51.31°N 00.27°W	TQ2059
Woodcote Green	Sutton	51.34°N 00.14°W	TQ2962
Woodcote Green	Worcestershire	52.34°N 02.13°W	SO9172
Woodcott	Hampshire	51.28°N 01.38°W	SU4354
Woodcroft	Gloucestershire	51.65°N 02.66°W	ST5495
Woodcutts	Dorset	50.95°N 02.04°W	ST9717
Wood Dalling	Norfolk	52.80°N 01.09°E	TG0927
Woodditton	Cambridgeshire	52.19°N 00.42°E	TL6658
Woodeaton	Oxfordshire	51.79°N 01.23°W	SP5311
Wood Eaton	Staffordshire	52.75°N 02.23°W	SJ8417
Wooden	Pembrokeshire	51.71°N 04.73°W	SN1105
Wood End	Bedfordshire	52.11°N 00.54°W	TL0004
Wood End	Berkshire	51.42°N 00.67°W	SU9270
Wood End	Buckinghamshire	51.96°N 00.85°W	SP7930
Wood End	Coventry	52.43°N 01.47°W	SP3682
Wood End	Herefordshire	52.06°N 02.54°W	SO6341
Wood End	Hertfordshire	51.90°N 00.08°W	TL3225
Wood End	Oldham	53.57°N 02.10°W	SD9309
Wood End	Tameside	53.51°N 02.04°W	SD9702
Wood End (Atherstone)	Warwickshire	52.58°N 01.64°W	SP2498
Wood End (Fillongley)	Warwickshire	52.48°N 01.57°W	SP293878
Wood End (Stratford-on-Avon)	Warwickshire	52.33°N 01.84°W	SP1071
Wood End	Wolverhampton	52.60°N 02.09°W	SJ9401
Woodend	Cheshire	53.36°N 02.04°W	SJ9785
Woodend	Cumbria	54.35°N 03.29°W	SD1696
Woodend	Essex	51.76°N 00.25°E	TL5610
Woodend	Fife	56.15°N 03.28°W	NT2096
Woodend	Northamptonshire	52.13°N 01.11°W	SP6149
Woodend	Nottinghamshire	53.13°N 01.31°W	SK4660
Woodend	Staffordshire	52.83°N 01.74°W	SK1726
Woodend	West Lothian	55.97°N 03.47°W	NT0877
Wood Enderby	Lincolnshire	53.14°N 00.10°W	TF2763
Woodend Green	Essex	51.92°N 00.25°E	TL5528
Wood End Green	Hillingdon	51.51°N 00.43°W	TQ0981
Woodfalls	Wiltshire	50.97°N 01.73°W	SU1920
Woodfield	Gloucestershire	51.68°N 02.37°W	ST7499
Woodfield	Oxfordshire	51.90°N 01.15°W	SP5823
Woodfield	South Ayrshire	55.48°N 04.62°W	NS3424
Woodford	Cornwall	50.88°N 04.54°W	SS2113
Woodford	Devon	50.33°N 03.70°W	SX7950
Woodford	Gloucestershire	51.65°N 02.44°W	ST6995
Woodford	Northamptonshire	52.38°N 00.59°W	SP9677
Woodford	Redbridge	51.60°N 00.02°E	TQ4091
Woodford	Somerset	51.13°N 03.34°W	ST0638
Woodford	Stockport	53.33°N 02.16°W	SJ8982
Woodford Bridge	Redbridge	51.60°N 00.04°E	TQ4291
Woodford Green	Redbridge	51.60°N 00.02°E	TQ4091
Woodford Halse	Northamptonshire	52.16°N 01.21°W	SP5452
Woodford Wells	Redbridge	51.60°N 00.02°E	TQ4092
Woodgate	Birmingham	52.43°N 02.01°W	SO9982
Woodgate	Devon	50.92°N 03.28°W	ST1015
Woodgate	Norfolk	52.70°N 00.98°E	TG0216
Woodgate	West Sussex	50.82°N 00.68°W	SU9304
Woodgate	Worcestershire	52.29°N 02.06°W	SO9666
Wood Gate	Staffordshire	52.84°N 01.77°W	SK1528
Woodgate Hill	Bury	53.59°N 02.27°W	SD8211
Woodgates End	Essex	51.90°N 00.28°E	TL5725
Woodgates Green	Worcestershire	52.32°N 02.54°W	SO6370
Woodgate Valley	Birmingham	52.44°N 02.00°W	SP0083
Wood Green	Essex	51.68°N 00.03°E	TL4100
Wood Green	Haringey	51.59°N 00.12°W	TQ3090
Wood Green	Norfolk	52.47°N 01.23°E	TM2091
Wood Green	Sandwell	52.56°N 02.01°W	SO9996
Wood Green	Worcestershire	52.30°N 02.29°W	SO8067
Woodgreen	Hampshire	50.95°N 01.75°W	SU1717
Woodgreen	Oxfordshire	51.78°N 01.47°W	SP3610
Woodhall	Hertfordshire	51.78°N 00.20°W	TL2411
Woodhall	Inverclyde	55.93°N 04.65°W	NS3474
Woodhall (Hemingbrough)	North Yorkshire	53.77°N 00.95°W	SE6931
Woodhall (Wensleydale)	North Yorkshire	54.30°N 02.04°W	SD9790
Woodhall Hills	Leeds	53.81°N 01.69°W	SE2035
Woodhall Spa	Lincolnshire	53.15°N 00.22°W	TF1963
Wood Hall	Essex	51.97°N 00.13°E	TL4733
Woodham	Buckinghamshire	51.85°N 00.98°W	SP7018
Woodham	Durham	54.62°N 01.56°W	NZ2826
Woodham	Surrey	51.34°N 00.50°W	TQ0462
Woodham Ferrers	Essex	51.66°N 00.58°E	TQ7999
Woodham Mortimer	Essex	51.70°N 00.61°E	TL8104
Woodham Walter	Essex	51.73°N 00.60°E	TL8007
Woodhatch	Surrey	51.21°N 00.21°W	TQ2548
Woodhaven	Fife	56.42°N 02.95°W	NO4126
Wood Hayes	Wolverhampton	52.60°N 02.09°W	SJ9401
Woodhead (New Aberdour)	Aberdeenshire	57.63°N 02.18°W	NJ8961
Woodhead or Woodhead of Fyvie (Formartine)	Aberdeenshire	57.43°N 02.35°W	NJ7938
Woodhead	Dumfries and Galloway	55.02°N 03.70°W	NX9171
Woodheads	Scottish Borders	55.69°N 02.74°W	NT5345
Woodhey	Bury	53.63°N 02.33°W	SD7815
Woodhey	Wirral	53.35°N 03.02°W	SJ3285
Woodhey Green	Cheshire	53.06°N 02.64°W	SJ5752
Woodhill	Essex	51.70°N 00.54°E	TL7604
Woodhill	North Somerset	51.48°N 02.77°W	ST4677
Woodhill	Shropshire	52.45°N 02.39°W	SO7384
Woodhill	Somerset	51.03°N 02.92°W	ST3527
Woodhorn	Northumberland	55.18°N 01.54°W	NZ2988
Woodhouse	Bradford	53.85°N 01.91°W	SE0640
Woodhouse	Calderdale	53.68°N 01.78°W	SE1421
Woodhouse (South Lakeland)	Cumbria	54.24°N 02.75°W	SD5183
Woodhouse (Copeland)	Cumbria	54.52°N 03.59°W	NX9716
Woodhouse	Hampshire	51.23°N 01.47°W	SU3749
Woodhouse	Leeds	53.81°N 01.56°W	SE2935
Woodhouse	Leicestershire	52.73°N 01.20°W	SK5415
Woodhouse	North Lincolnshire	53.56°N 00.82°W	SE7808
Woodhouse	Sheffield	53.36°N 01.38°W	SK4185
Woodhouse	Wakefield	53.69°N 01.42°W	SE3822
Woodhouse Down	South Gloucestershire	51.56°N 02.56°W	ST6185
Woodhouse Eaves	Leicestershire	52.72°N 01.23°W	SK5214
Woodhouse Green	Staffordshire	53.15°N 02.13°W	SJ9162
Wood House	Lancashire	53.97°N 02.45°W	SD7053
Woodhouselee	Midlothian	55.86°N 03.23°W	NT2364
Woodhouse Mill	Sheffield	53.36°N 01.37°W	SK4285
Woodhouse Park	Manchester	53.37°N 02.27°W	SJ8286
Woodhouses	Cheshire	53.27°N 02.75°W	SJ5075
Woodhouses	Cumbria	54.85°N 03.06°W	NY3252
Woodhouses	Oldham	53.49°N 02.13°W	SD9100
Woodhouses (Lichfield)	Staffordshire	52.67°N 01.88°W	SK0809
Woodhouses (Yoxall)	Staffordshire	52.76°N 01.77°W	SK1519
Woodhouses	Trafford	53.40°N 02.36°W	SJ7690
Woodhurst	Cambridgeshire	52.36°N 00.07°W	TL3176

==== Woodi – Woody ====
Location	Locality	Coordinates (links to map & photo sources)	OS grid reference
Woodingdean	Brighton and Hove	50.82°N 00.07°W	TQ3605
Woodington	Hampshire	50.97°N 01.55°W	SU3120
Woodkirk	Kirklees	53.71°N 01.59°W	SE2724
Woodlake	Dorset	50.74°N 02.17°W	SY8894
Woodland	Cumbria	54.29°N 03.16°W	SD2489
Woodland (parish near Ashburton)	Devon	50.49°N 03.70°W	SX7968
Woodland (Ivybridge)	Devon	50.38°N 03.94°W	SX6256
Woodland	Durham	54.62°N 01.89°W	NZ0726
Woodland	Kent	51.12°N 01.05°E	TR1441
Woodland Head	Devon	50.75°N 03.73°W	SX7896
Woodlands	Aberdeenshire	57.04°N 02.34°W	NO7995
Woodlands	Calderdale	53.73°N 01.86°W	SE0926
Woodlands	Doncaster	53.55°N 01.20°W	SE5307
Woodlands	Dorset	50.88°N 01.93°W	SU0509
Woodlands	Dumfries and Galloway	55.07°N 03.42°W	NY0977
Woodlands	Hampshire	50.89°N 01.54°W	SU3211
Woodlands	Hounslow	51.46°N 00.34°W	TQ1575
Woodlands	Kent	51.31°N 00.23°E	TQ5660
Woodlands	North Yorkshire	53.98°N 01.51°W	SE3254
Woodlands	Oxfordshire	51.53°N 00.90°W	SU7682
Woodlands (West Pennard)	Somerset	51.13°N 02.65°W	ST5437
Woodlands (Holford)	Somerset	51.15°N 03.20°W	ST1640
Woodlands	Tameside	53.47°N 02.04°W	SJ9797
Woodlands Common	Dorset	50.87°N 01.91°W	SU0608
Woodlands Park	Berkshire	51.49°N 00.77°W	SU8578
Woodlands St Mary	Berkshire	51.46°N 01.52°W	SU3374
Wood Lane	Shropshire	52.88°N 02.87°W	SJ4132
Wood Lane	Staffordshire	53.04°N 02.28°W	SJ8150
Woodlane	Shropshire	52.83°N 02.46°W	SJ6927
Woodlane	Staffordshire	52.77°N 01.79°W	SK1420
Wood Lanes	Cheshire	53.32°N 02.10°W	SJ9381
Woodleigh	Devon	50.31°N 03.78°W	SX7348
Woodlesford	Leeds	53.75°N 01.45°W	SE3629
Woodley	Berkshire	51.44°N 00.92°W	SU7572
Woodley	Hampshire	50.99°N 01.47°W	SU3722
Woodley	Stockport	53.42°N 02.09°W	SJ9492
Woodley Green	Berkshire	51.45°N 00.89°W	SU7773
Woodleys	Oxfordshire	51.86°N 01.39°W	SP4219
Woodlinkin	Derbyshire	53.02°N 01.36°W	SK4348
Woodloes Park	Warwickshire	52.29°N 01.59°W	SP2866
Woodmancote (Tewkesbury Borough)	Gloucestershire	51.94°N 02.04°W	SO9727
Woodmancote (Cirencester)	Gloucestershire	51.77°N 02.00°W	SP0008
Woodmancote (Dursley)	Gloucestershire	51.67°N 02.36°W	ST7597
Woodmancote (Chichester District)	West Sussex	50.85°N 00.90°W	SU7707
Woodmancote (Horsham District)	West Sussex	50.91°N 00.25°W	TQ2314
Woodmancote	Worcestershire	52.07°N 02.14°W	SO9042
Woodmancott	Hampshire	51.17°N 01.20°W	SU5642
Woodmansey	East Riding of Yorkshire	53.81°N 00.40°W	TA0537
Woodmansgreen	West Sussex	51.03°N 00.77°W	SU8627
Woodmans Green	East Sussex	50.94°N 00.50°E	TQ7619
Woodmansterne	Surrey	51.31°N 00.17°W	TQ2759
Woodmanton	Devon	50.65°N 03.40°W	SY0185
Woodmill	Staffordshire	52.78°N 01.80°W	SK1321
Woodminton	Wiltshire	50.99°N 02.00°W	SU0022
Woodnesborough	Kent	51.25°N 01.30°E	TR3156
Woodnewton	Northamptonshire	52.53°N 00.48°W	TL0394
Woodnook	Lancashire	53.73°N 02.36°W	SD7627
Woodnook	Lincolnshire	52.87°N 00.60°W	SK9432
Wood Norton	Norfolk	52.81°N 00.98°E	TG0128
Wood Norton	Worcestershire	52.12°N 01.98°W	SP0147
Woodplumpton	Lancashire	53.80°N 02.76°W	SD5034
Woodram	Somerset	50.95°N 03.11°W	ST2218
Woodrising	Norfolk	52.58°N 00.92°E	TF9803
Wood Road	Bury	53.62°N 02.31°W	SD7914
Wood Row	Leeds	53.73°N 01.42°W	SE3827
Woodrow	Buckinghamshire	51.65°N 00.65°W	SU9396
Woodrow	Cumbria	54.79°N 03.21°W	NY2245
Woodrow (Hazelbury Bryan)	Dorset	50.88°N 02.38°W	ST7309
Woodrow (Fifehead Neville)	Dorset	50.88°N 02.35°W	ST7510
Woodrow	Redditch, Worcestershire	52.28°N 01.92°W	SP0565
Woodrow	Wyre Forest, Worcestershire	52.37°N 02.17°W	SO8875
Woods Bank	Walsall	52.56°N 02.04°W	SO9796
Wood's Corner	East Sussex	50.94°N 00.36°E	TQ6619
Woodsden	Kent	51.05°N 00.52°E	TQ7731
Woodseats	Derbyshire	53.42°N 02.01°W	SJ9992
Wood Seats	Sheffield	53.45°N 01.50°W	SK3395
Woodseaves	Shropshire	52.87°N 02.47°W	SJ6831
Woodseaves	Staffordshire	52.82°N 02.31°W	SJ7925
Woods Eaves	Herefordshire	52.13°N 03.03°W	SO2949
Woodsend	Pembrokeshire	51.74°N 05.08°W	SM8710
Woodsend	Wiltshire	51.47°N 01.68°W	SU2275
Woods End	Trafford	53.45°N 02.39°W	SJ7495
Woodsetton	Dudley	52.53°N 02.11°W	SO9293
Woodsetts	Rotherham	53.34°N 01.17°W	SK5583
Woodsfield	Worcestershire	52.13°N 02.27°W	SO8148
Woodsfold	Lancashire	53.81°N 02.80°W	SD4736
Woodsford	Dorset	50.70°N 02.34°W	SY7690
Wood's Green	East Sussex	51.07°N 00.32°E	TQ6333
Woodside	City of Aberdeen	57.16°N 02.15°W	NJ9108
Woodside (Bedford)	Bedfordshire	52.15°N 00.43°W	TL0752
Woodside (Slip End)	Bedfordshire	51.85°N 00.44°W	TL0718
Woodside	Berkshire	51.43°N 00.66°W	SU9371
Woodside	Calderdale	53.74°N 01.80°W	SE1328
Woodside (Ashton Hayes)	Cheshire	53.22°N 02.72°W	SJ5270
Woodside (Wettenhall)	Cheshire	53.13°N 02.55°W	SJ6360
Woodside	Croydon	51.38°N 00.07°W	TQ3467
Woodside (Old Bolsover)	Derbyshire	53.25°N 01.31°W	SK4673
Woodside (Horsley Woodhouse)	Derbyshire	52.98°N 01.42°W	SK3943
Woodside	Dudley	52.49°N 02.11°W	SO9288
Woodside	Dumfries and Galloway	55.06°N 03.50°W	NY0475
Woodside (near Bishop Auckland)	Durham	54.65°N 01.73°W	NZ1729
Woodside	Essex	51.70°N 00.12°E	TL4703
Woodside (near Leven)	Fife	56.25°N 02.93°W	NO4207
Woodside (Glenrothes)	Fife	56.18°N 03.14°W	NO2900
Woodside	Hampshire	50.74°N 01.54°W	SZ3294
Woodside (Watford)	Hertfordshire	51.69°N 00.40°W	TL1001
Woodside (Hatfield)	Hertfordshire	51.73°N 00.19°W	TL2506
Woodside	Isle of Wight	50.73°N 01.23°W	SZ5493
Woodside	Moray	57.57°N 03.59°W	NJ0555
Woodside	North Lincolnshire	53.51°N 00.93°W	SE7103
Woodside	Perth and Kinross	56.51°N 03.30°W	NO2037
Woodside (Clun)	Shropshire	52.41°N 03.01°W	SO3180
Woodside (Madeley)	Shropshire	52.63°N 02.47°W	SJ6804
Woodside Green	Essex	51.84°N 00.19°E	TL5118
Woodside Green	Kent	51.24°N 00.72°E	TQ9053
Woodside of Arbeadie	Aberdeenshire	57.05°N 02.49°W	NO7096
Woodside Park	Barnet	51.61°N 00.19°W	TQ2592
Woods Moor	Stockport	53.38°N 02.15°W	SJ9087
Woodspeen	Berkshire	51.41°N 01.36°W	SU4469
Woodspring Priory	North Somerset	51.38°N 02.95°W	ST3466
Wood Stanway	Gloucestershire	51.97°N 01.91°W	SP0631
Woodstock	Kent	51.30°N 00.72°E	TQ9060
Woodstock	Oxfordshire	51.84°N 01.36°W	SP4416
Woodstock	Pembrokeshire	51.88°N 04.87°W	SN0225
Woodston	Cambridgeshire	52.55°N 00.26°W	TL1897
Wood Street	Norfolk	52.74°N 01.51°E	TG3722
Wood Street Village	Surrey	51.24°N 00.64°W	SU9550
Woodthorpe	Derbyshire	53.26°N 01.32°W	SK4574
Woodthorpe	Leicestershire	52.74°N 01.20°W	SK5417
Woodthorpe	Lincolnshire	53.29°N 00.14°E	TF4380
Woodthorpe	Nottinghamshire	52.99°N 01.13°W	SK5844
Woodthorpe	York	53.93°N 01.13°W	SE5749
Woodton	Norfolk	52.48°N 01.37°E	TM2993
Woodtown (Alverdiscott)	Devon	51.00°N 04.15°W	SS4925
Woodtown (Alwington)	Devon	50.98°N 04.26°W	SS4123
Woodvale	Sefton	53.59°N 03.05°W	SD3011
Woodville	Derbyshire	52.76°N 01.54°W	SK3119
Woodville	Dorset	50.98°N 02.28°W	ST8021
Woodville Feus	Angus	56.57°N 02.65°W	NO6043
Woodwall Green	Staffordshire	52.87°N 02.32°W	SJ7831
Woodwalton	Cambridgeshire	52.40°N 00.22°W	TL2180
Woodway	Oxfordshire	51.55°N 01.23°W	SU5384
Woodway Park	Coventry	52.42°N 01.45°W	SP3781
Woodwell	Northamptonshire	52.38°N 00.60°W	SP9577
Woodwick	Orkney Islands	59.09°N 03.08°W	HY3823
Woodworth Green	Cheshire	53.10°N 02.64°W	SJ5757
Woodyates	Dorset	50.97°N 01.97°W	SU0219
Woody Bay	Devon	51.22°N 03.90°W	SS6749
