= Woodhouse =

Woodhouse may refer to:

== People ==
- Woodhouse (surname)

== Settlements ==
- Woodhouse, Alberta, Canada
- Woodhouse, Bradford, a location in West Yorkshire, England
- Woodhouse, Calderdale, a location in West Yorkshire, England
- Woodhouse, Copeland, a location in Cumbria, England
- Woodhouse, Hampshire, a location in England
- Woodhouse, Leeds, West Yorkshire, England
  - Woodhouse Moor, Leeds
  - Woodhouse Ridge, Leeds
  - Woodhouse Cemetery, Leeds
- Woodhouse, Leicestershire, England
- Woodhouse, Lincolnshire, a location in England
- Woodhouse, Northumberland, a former civil parish in Northumberland, England
- Woodhouse, South Lakeland, a location in Cumbria, England
- Woodhouse, South Yorkshire, England
  - Woodhouse railway station in this area
- Woodhouse, Wakefield, a location in West Yorkshire, England
- Woodhouse Hill, Huddersfield, West Yorkshire, England
- Woodhouse Copse, Isle of Wight, England, a woodland
- Woodhouse Park, Wythenshawe, Manchester, Greater Manchester, England
- Woodhouse Township, Ontario, Canada
- Annesley Woodhouse, Nottinghamshire, England
- Dronfield Woodhouse, Derbyshire, England
- Holbeck Woodhouse, Nottinghamshire, England
- Horsley Woodhouse, Derbyshire, England
- Mansfield Woodhouse, Nottinghamshire, England
  - Mansfield Woodhouse railway station
- Over Woodhouse, Derbyshire, England
- Woodhouse (ward), London, England

== Buildings and institutions ==
- Woodhouse, County Waterford, a historic house and estate near Stradbally, County Waterford, Ireland.
- Woodhouse, Shropshire, a country house in West Felton, Shropshire, England
- Woodhouse Chocolate, a famous shop in Napa Valley, California, US
- Woodhouse College, a sixth form college in Finchley, North London, England
- Woodhouse Copse, Holmbury St Mary, an Arts and Crafts house and operatic venue in Surrey, England
- Woodhouse Grammar School, a former secondary school in Finchley, North London, England
- Woodhouse Grove School, independent school in Apperly Bridge, West Yorkshire, England
- Woodhouse High School, former name of Landau Forte Academy, Amington, a school in Tamworth, Staffordshire, England
- Woodhouse House (Virginia Beach, Virginia), US
- The Wodehouse, formerly spelled the Woodhouse, a country house near Wombourne, Staffordshire, notable for its connections with British musical history.
- Wentworth Woodhouse, a country house near Rotherham, South Yorkshire, England

== Woodhouses ==
- Woodhouses, Cheshire, a location in England
- Woodhouses, Cumbria, a location in England
- Woodhouses, Oldham, Greater Manchester, England
- Woodhouses, Trafford, a location in Greater Manchester, England
- Woodhouses, Lichfield, a location in Staffordshire, England
- Woodhouses, Okeover, a former civil parish in East Staffordshire, Staffordshire, England
- Woodhouses, Yoxall, a location in Staffordshire, England

== See also ==
- P. G. Wodehouse
- Wodehouse (disambiguation)
- Wild man, also known as wodwo, wodehouse or woodwose, mythological figure
