= Failsworth (disambiguation) =

Failsworth is a town in the Metropolitan Borough of Oldham, Greater Manchester, England.

Failsworth may also refer to:

- Failsworth tram stop, formerly railway station
- Failsworth School
- Failsworth stadium, a cancelled football stadium for Oldham Athletic A.F.C.
