= List of road junctions in the United Kingdom: W =

This is a partial list of road junctions in the United Kingdom.

Many road junctions are named after pubs. For more information regarding the derivation of pub names, see pub names.

== W ==
| Junction Name | Type | Location | Roads | Grid Reference | Notes |
|---|---|---|---|---|---|
| Wades' Corner | Crossroads | Baldersby, North Yorkshire | A61; Wide Howe Lane; Underlands Lane (now no longer accessible to motors) | SE355773 | |
| Waggoner's Roundabout | Roundabout | Cranford, LB Hounslow | A4 Bath Road; A312 The Parkway | 51°28′40″N 0°24′15″W | |
| Wake Arms Roundabout | Roundabout | Epping Forest, Essex | A104 Epping New Road (formerly A11); A121 Woodridden Hill; A121 Goldings Hill; B172 Jack's Hill; B1393 Epping Road (formerly A11) | 51°40′30″N 0°03′46″E | Named after the pub on the roundabout |
| Walcot Bar | Crossroads | Walcot, Lincolnshire | A15; Acre Lane; unclass. | TF075351 | |
| Wall Island | Non standard grade separated interchange | Wall, near Lichfield | M6 Toll T5; A5 Watling Street; A5127 Birmingham Road; A5148 | 52°39′01″N 1°50′02″W | |
| Wallington Green | Crossroads | Wallington, LB Sutton | A232 Acre Lane; A232 Croydon Road; A237 Manor Road | 51°22′03″N 0°09′13″W | |
| Wallington Interchange | Roundabout Interchange | Wallington, Hampshire | M27 J11; A27 | 50°51′37″N 1°09′28″W | |
| Walnut Tree Roundabout | Roundabout | Kents Hill, Milton Keynes | H9 Groveway; V11 (A4146) Tongwell Street | 52°01′34″N 0°41′24″W | |
| Walsall Interchange | Roundabout Interchange | Walsall, West Midlands | M6 J10; A454 Black Country Route; A454 Wolverhampton Road; B4464 Wolverhampton Road West | 52°35′09″N 2°00′52″W | B4464 westbound allows only access to the hotel and for buses. The derelict Anson Branch Canal passes underneath the junction. |
| Walsgrave Triangle | Roundabout Interchange | Walsgrave, Coventry | M6 J2; M69; A46; A4600 Hinckley Road | 52°26′15″N 1°25′42″W | |
| Walton Roundabout | Roundabout | Walnut Tree, Milton Keynes | H9 Groveway; V10 Brickhill Street | 52°01′21″N 0°42′11″W | |
| Walton Park Roundabout | Roundabout | Walton Park, Milton Keynes | H10 (A4146) Bletcham Way; V10 Brickhill Street | 52°00′45″N 0°41′43″W | |
| Wandsworth Bridge Roundabout | Roundabout | Wandsworth, London | A214 Trinity Road; A217 Bridgend Road; A217 Swandon Way; A3205 York Road | 51°27′45″N 0°11′08″W | |
| Wandsworth Gyratory | Gyratory | LB Wandsworth | A3; A218; A3209; A3205 | 51°27′29″N 0°11′37″W | |
| Wansbrough Roundabout | Roundabout | Worle, North Somerset | Wansbrough Road; Queensway; Coker Road | 51°21′48.00″N 2°54′42.02″W | Formerly Nelson Roundabout (until c.2020) |
| Wapses Roundabout | Roundabout | Caterham, Surrey | A22 Godstone Road; A22 Caterham Bypass; B2208 Croydon Road; Burntwood Lane; Woldingham Road; Succomb's Hill | 51°17′51″N 0°04′14″W | |
| Warndon | Roundabout Interchange | Worcester, Worcestershire | M5 J6; A449; A4538 Pershore Lane; A4440 (formerly B4639) | 52°12′44″N 2°09′34″W | |
| The Warren | Crossroads | Whitton, LB Richmond upon Thames | A314 Hanworth Road; A3063 Wellington Road South; B358 Nelson Road | 51°27′25″N 0°22′22″W | Named after the pub at the junction. |
| Warren Lane Roundabout | Non standard grade separated interchange | Castle Donington, Leicestershire | M1 J24a (southbound); A50 (eastbound); Warren Lane | 52°51′20″N 1°18′10″W | |
| Watchorn Roundabout | Roundabout | Swanwick, Derbyshire | A38; A61 Derby Road; B6179 Derby Road; unclass. | SK364400 | |
| Waterdale | Grade separated interchange | Bricket Wood, Hertfordshire | M1 J6; A405 North Orbital Road | 51°42′22″N 0°22′54″W | |
| Waterloo Cross | Crossroads | Sampford Peverell, Devon | A38; B3181; unclass. | ST055140 | |
| Waterloo Road Junction | Crossroads | Wolverhampton, West Midlands | A4150 Ring Road; Waterloo Road | 52°35′16″N 2°07′57″W | The northbound Waterloo Road gives access to the Molinuex football ground. Waterloo Road was formerly the route of the A449 in Wolverhampton. |
| Waterworks Corner | Roundabout Interchange | Walthamstow, LB Waltham Forest | A406 Southend Road; A104 Woodford New Road; A503 Forest Road | 51°35′42″N 0°00′37″E | |
| Wavendon Gate Roundabout | | Old Farm Park, Milton Keynes | H10 Bletcham Way; unclass.; unclass. | SP907365 | |
| Wednesbury | | Walsall, West Midlands | M6 J9; A461 Bescot Road; A461 Wood Green Road | 52°34′0″N 2°00′11″W | |
| Weeford Island | | Weeford, near Lichfield | M6 Toll T4; A5; A38 London Road | 52°38′23″N 1°48′16″W | |
| Well Hall Roundabout | | Eltham, LB Greenwich | A205 Westhorne Avenue; A205 Well Hall Road; A208 Well Hall Road | 51°27′37″N 0°02′58″E | |
| Wellington | | Telford, Shropshire | M54 J7; A5; B5061 | 52°41′27″N 2°32′35″W | |
| Wennington Interchange | | near Wennington, LB Havering | A13 Thames Gateway; A1306 London Road (formerly A13) | TQ548803 | Junction straddles border with Thurrock, historically in Essex |
| Wenmouth Cross | | St Neot, Cornwall | unclass.; unclass. | SX197679 | |
| Wesham Circle | | West Midlands | M55 J3; A585 Fleetwood Road | SD415349 | |
| Wesham Circle | | West Midlands | M55 J3; A585 Fleetwood Road | SD415349 | |
| Wessex Roundabout | | Weymouth, Dorset | B3157 Chickerell Link Road; B3157 Radipole Lane; B3157 Granby Way; Radipole Lane; Unclassified | SY659800 | |
| West Burridge Cross | footpath crossing | Chawleigh, Mid Devon | unclass., to Cheldon / Burridge Moor Cross; footpath, to Coopers Cross / West Burridge | 50.8980°N 3.7915°W | |
| West Ferry Interchange | | Glasgow | M8 J31; A8 Greenock Road | 55°55′25″N 4°33′23″W | |
| West Street Interchange | | Glasgow | M8 J20; M74 J1; Wallace Street; Cook Street | 55°51′11″N 4°16′14″W | |
| Westcarr Road Junction | | Attleborough, Norfolk | A11 Attleborough Bypass; Westcarr Road | TM034947 | |
| Westcroft Roundabout | | Westcroft, Milton Keynes | H7 Chaffron Way; V2 Tattenhoe Street | 52°00′16″N 0°47′20″W | |
| Westerhouse Road Interchange | | Glasgow | M8 J10; Westerhouse Road; Bartiebeath Road | 55°52′0″N 4°07′49″W | |
| Western Circus | | Acton, London | A40 Western Avenue; Oak Common Lane; Old Oak Road | 51°30′50″N 0°14′57″W | Referred to as Savoy Circus on A-Z maps, Western Circus in gov't SIs. |
| Westmill Interchange: aka Ware Interchange | Roundabout Interchange | Ware, Hertfordshire | A10; A602 Westmill Road; B1001 Watton Road | TL346152 | |
Westmill Roundabout: see Paynes Hall Roundabout
| Whipps Cross | | Walthamstow, London Borough of Waltham Forest | A104 Lea Bridge Road; B160 Wood Street | TQ387888 | |
| The Whirlies | Roundabout | East Kilbride | A725 East Kilbride Expressway; Kingsway; B783 East Mains Road; Calderwood Road | 55.7755°N 4.1631°W | |
| White City Interchange | | White City, London | A40 Westway (formerly A40(M)); A3220 West Cross Route (formerly M41) | 51°30′56″N 0°13′15″W | |
| White Cross | | Cury, Cornwall | Gilly Hill; unclass. | SW684215 | |
| White Cross | | near Indian Queens, Cornwall | A392; Barton Lane; unclass. | SW890598 | |
| White Cross | | near Wadebridge, Cornwall | A39; Tredruston Road | SW965720 | |
| White Cross | | Harwich, Essex | B1352 Wrabness Road; Rectory Lane; Primrose Lane | TM183309 | |
| White Cross | | Brent Knoll, Somerset | A38 Bristol Road; Brent Street; Harp Road | 51°14′37″N 2°56′46″W | |
| White Hart Cross | | Bovingdon, Hertfordshire | B4505 Chesham Road; Bovingdon Green; Ley Hill Road | 51°43′07″N 0°32′43″W | |
| White Hart Roundabout | | Northolt | A312 The Parkway; A312 Church Road; A4180 Ruislip Road; B455 Ruislip Road; Yeading Lane | 51°32′10″N 0°23′27″W | |
| Whitefield Interchange | | Prestwich, Greater Manchester | M60 J17; A56 Bury New Road | SD809047 | |
| Whitesand Cross | | Milkwell, Wiltshire | A30; Overway Lane | ST925235 | |
| Whiteway Bottom | Crossroads | Kimpton, Hertfordshire | Whiteway Bottom Lane; unclass. | 51°52′27″N 0°19′30″W | |
| Whiteways Lodge Roundabout: aka Bury Hill Roundabout | Roundabout | Madehurst, West Sussex | A29 Bury Hill; A29 Fairmile Bottom; A284 London Road; B2139 | 50°53′17″N 0°34′37″W | |
| Whitletts Roundabout: aka Whit Lets Roundabout | | Ayr, South Ayrshire | A77; A719 High Road; B743; B743 Heathfield Road | NS366233 | |
| Whitney Roundabout | | Whitney, Milton Keynes | H6 Childs Way; V1 Snelshall Street | 52°00′13″N 0°48′20″W | |
| Whitton Road Roundabout | | Twickenham, LB Richmond upon Thames | A316 Chertsey Road; B361 Whitton Road | 51°27′15″N 0°20′14″W | |
| Whyke Roundabout | Roundabout | Chichester, West Sussex | A27 Chichester Bypass; B2145 Whyke Road; A27 Chichester Bypass; B2145 Whyke Road | SU 86887 03678 | |
| Wick Roundabout | Roundabout | Wick, Littlehampton West Sussex | A284 Lyminster Road; A259 Worthing Road; A284 Wick Street; A259; Private Road, Access to Morrisons Supermarket | TQ026034 | |
| Wickersley Roundabout | | Wickersley, South Yorkshire | A631 Bawtry Lane; B6060 Morthen Road; Northfield Lane | 53°25′19″N 1°16′52″W | |
| Widford Roundabout | Roundabout | Chelmsford, Essex | A414 London Road; A414 Greenbury Way; A1114 London Road; Widford Road | TL694051 | |
| Willen Roundabout | Roundabout | Willen Park, Milton Keynes | H4 Dansteed Way; V10 Brickhill Street | 52°03′47″N 0°44′01″W | |
| WilliamsF1 Roundabout | Roundabout | Wantage, Oxfordshire | A338; unclass | 51°37′02″N 1°24′37″W | Built at the entrance to the Williams Formula 1 Team Base |
| Wilsons Corner | Dual mini roundabouts | Brentwood, Essex | A1023 High Street; A128 Ongar Road; A1023 Shenfield Road; A128 Ingrave Road | TQ597939 | Named after Wilsons furniture store which was formerly located on the south east corner of the junction. |
| Windhover Roundabout | | Lowford, Hampshire | A27 West End Road; A27 Burlesdon Road; A3024; A3025 Hamble Lane | SU480110 | |
| Windmill Hill Roundabout | | Emerson Valley, Milton Keynes | H8 Standing Way; V2 Tattenhoe Street; Tattenhoe Lane | 51°59′54″N 0°46′21″W | |
| Windy Cross | T junction | Woodacott, Holsworthy, Devon | unclass. roads to: Holsworthy Beacon and Milton Dameral N; Thornbury E; Woodacott W | 50.8485°N 4.2870°W | Named on fingerpost |
| Winnard's Perch Roundabout | | near St Columb Major, Cornwall | A39; B3274 | SW927663 | |
| Winter's Cross | | Ross-on-Wye, Herefordshire | A49; unclass. | SO556250 | |
| Winterstoke Roundabout | Roundabout | Weston-super-Mare, North Somerset | A370 Herluin Way; A370 Marchfields Way; Winterstoke Road | 51°20′19.94″N 2°57′28.33″W | |
| Wisley Interchange | | Surrey | M25 J10; A3 Portsmouth Road | 51°19′21″N 0°27′02″W | |
| Wix Cross | | Wix, Essex | Colchester Road (formerly A604); Harwich Road (formerly A604); Clacton Road; Bradfield Road | TM163284 | |
| Wobbly Wheel | | Kennford, Devon | A38; A379 (formerly A38) | 50°40′19″N 3°32′10″W | Named after the Wobbly Wheel Garage, in Kennford, which stood on the site of the Partridge Cycles shop. |
| The Wood Stock | | Morden Park, LB Merton | A24 Epsom Road; A24 Stonecot Hill; B279 Tudor Drive; B279 Sutton Common Road | 51°23′09″N 0°12′41″W | |
| Wood Street Junction | | Walthamstow, LB Waltham Forest | A503 Forest Road; B160 Wood Street; B160 Fulbourne Road | TQ383900 | |
| Woodacott Cross | Crossroads | Woodacott, Holsworthy, Devon | unclass. roads to: Milton Demeral N; Thornbury E; Holsworthy S; Woodacott W | 50.8473°N 4.2931°W | Named on fingerpost |
| Wooden Bridge | | Guildford, Surrey | A3; A322 Worplesdon Road; A25 Middleton Road | SU986508 | After the adjacent pub The Wooden Bridge. Also known (locally) as The Dennis Roundabout, due to the proximity of the former Dennis works. |
| Woolstone Roundabout | | Woolstone, Milton Keynes | H6 Childs Way; V10 Brickhill Street | 52°02′50″N 0°43′24″W | |
| Worrygoose Roundabout | | Rotherham, South Yorkshire | A631 East Bawtry Road; A6123 Herringthorpe Valley Road; B6410 Broom Lane | 53°24′48″N 1°19′15″W | |
| Worsley Braided Interchange | | Swinton, Greater Manchester | M60 J15; M61 J1; A580 East Lancashire Road | 53°31′26″N 2°21′40″W | |
| Worsley Interchange | | Worsley, Greater Manchester | M60 J13; A572 Leigh Road; A572 Worsley Road; A575 Walkden Road; B5211 Barton Road | SD756019 | |
| Wottons Cross | | Landrake, Cornwall | Frenchman's Lane; unclass. | SX369614 | |
| Wylye Interchange | | Deptford, Wiltshire | A36; A303; High Street | 51°08′40″N 1°59′03″W | |
