= Woodcote (disambiguation) =

Woodcote is a village in Oxfordshire, England.

Woodcote may also refer to:

- Woodcote, London, England
- Woodcote, Shropshire, England
- Woodcote, Surrey, a location in England
- Woodcot - an East Indiaman launched in 1786 that the French captured in 1798
- Woodcote, a corner of the Silverstone Circuit
