= Pack Horse Inn =

Listed former pub in Failsworth, Greater Manchester, England

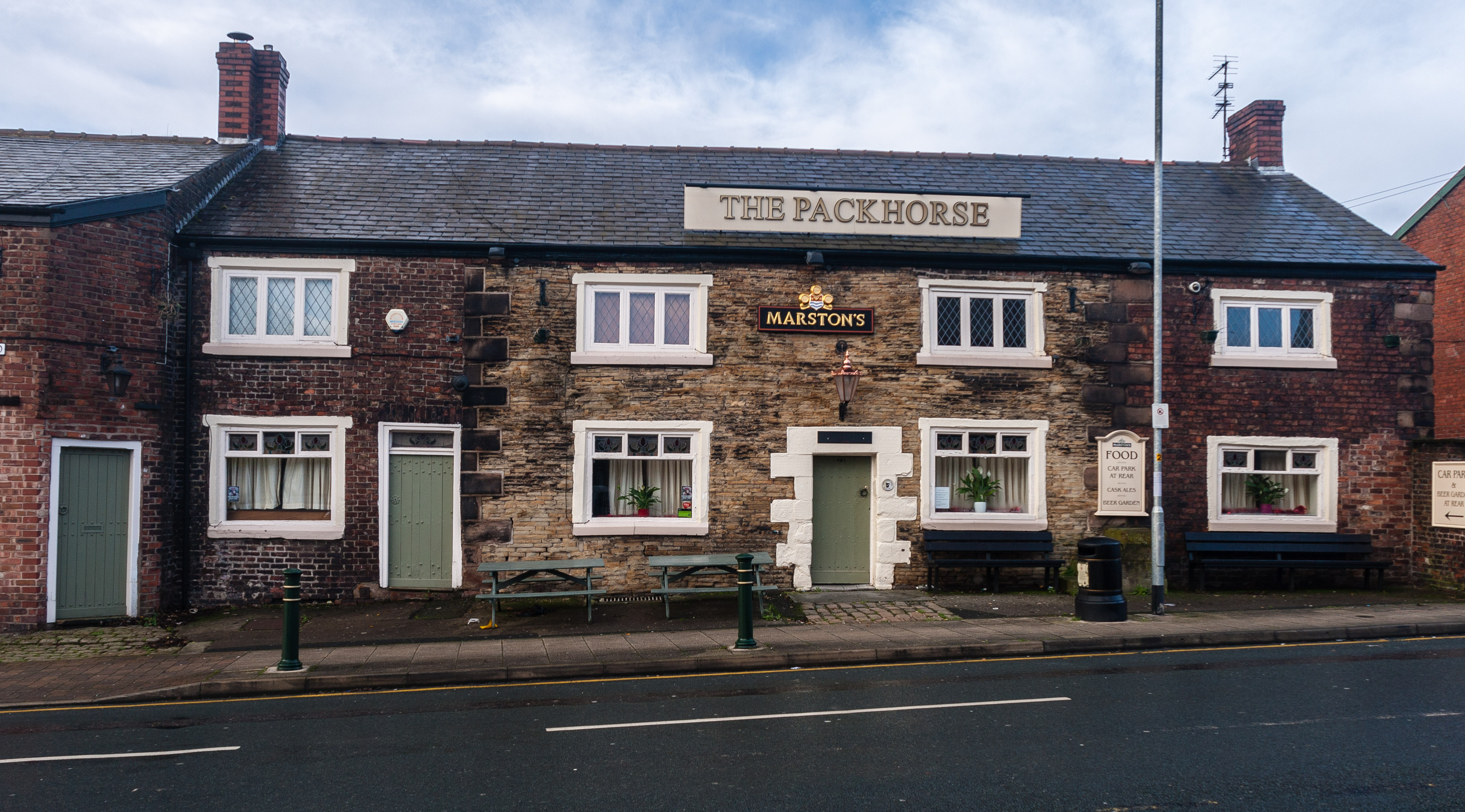
- The pub in 2014, prior to its closure in 2015

- Location within Greater Manchester
- Alternative names: The Packhorse

General information
- Status: Converted to offices
- Type: Public house (former)
- Location: 481 Oldham Road, Failsworth, Greater Manchester, England
- Coordinates: 53.5123°N 2.1554°W
- Year built: Early 18th century (probable)
- Closed: 2015 (as a pub)

Design and construction
- Designations

Listed Building – Grade II
- Official name: Former Pack Horse Inn
- Designated: 24 March 1966
- Reference no.: 1162698

The Pack Horse Inn (which traded as The Packhorse) is a Grade II listed former public house on Oldham Road in Failsworth, a town within the Metropolitan Borough of Oldham, Greater Manchester, England. Probably built in the early 18th century, it closed in 2015 and was subsequently converted into offices.

== History ==
The building was probably constructed in the early 18th century, according to its official listing. The 1894 and 1935 Ordnance Survey maps mark the building as an inn and public house respectively, although no name is shown.

On 24 March 1966, the Pack Horse Inn was designated a Grade II listed building. The pub was delicensed in July 2015, after which the building was converted for office use.

== Architecture ==
The building is constructed of roughly dressed stone with a slate roof and later brick additions. It has two storeys and originally consisted of two main rooms, with brick bays added to each side in the 18th century and another extension to the left. The corners are marked with dressed stone. A central timber door with metal studs sits beneath a heavy lintel. Each floor has four windows, all set in later stone surrounds and fitted with 20th‑century casements. There are chimneys on the gable ends, and a set of mounting steps stands against the front wall. A small 20th‑century extension projects from the rear.

== See also ==
- Listed buildings in Failsworth
- Listed pubs in Greater Manchester
