= Woodridge =

Woodridge may refer to:

== Australia ==
- Woodridge, Queensland, a suburb of Brisbane
  - Woodridge railway station
  - Electoral district of Woodridge
  - Woodridge State High School
- Woodridge, Western Australia, a town near Perth

== Canada ==
- Woodridge, in the Rural Municipality of Piney, Manitoba
  - Woodridge Ecological Reserve
- Woodridge Estates, Alberta (disambiguation)

== New Zealand ==
- Woodridge, New Zealand, a suburb of Wellington City

== South Africa ==
- Woodridge College and Preparatory School

== United Kingdom ==
- Woodridge Nature Reserve, in Woodside Park, London

== United States ==
- Woodridge, Illinois
  - Woodridge School District 68
- Woodridge, Virginia
- Wood-Ridge, New Jersey
- Woodridge, New York
- Woodridge, North Dakota
- Woodridge, Washington, D.C., a neighborhood
  - Woodridge Neighborhood Library
- Woodridge (Wheeling, West Virginia), a historic house
- Woodridge Local School District, in Ohio
  - Woodridge High School

== See also ==
- Woodbridge (disambiguation)
