= Woodbridge Township =

Woodbridge Township may refer to the following places:

- Woodbridge Township, Michigan
- Woodbridge Township, New Jersey

== See also ==
- Woodbridge (disambiguation)
