= Failsworth Town Hall =

Municipal building in Greater Manchester, England

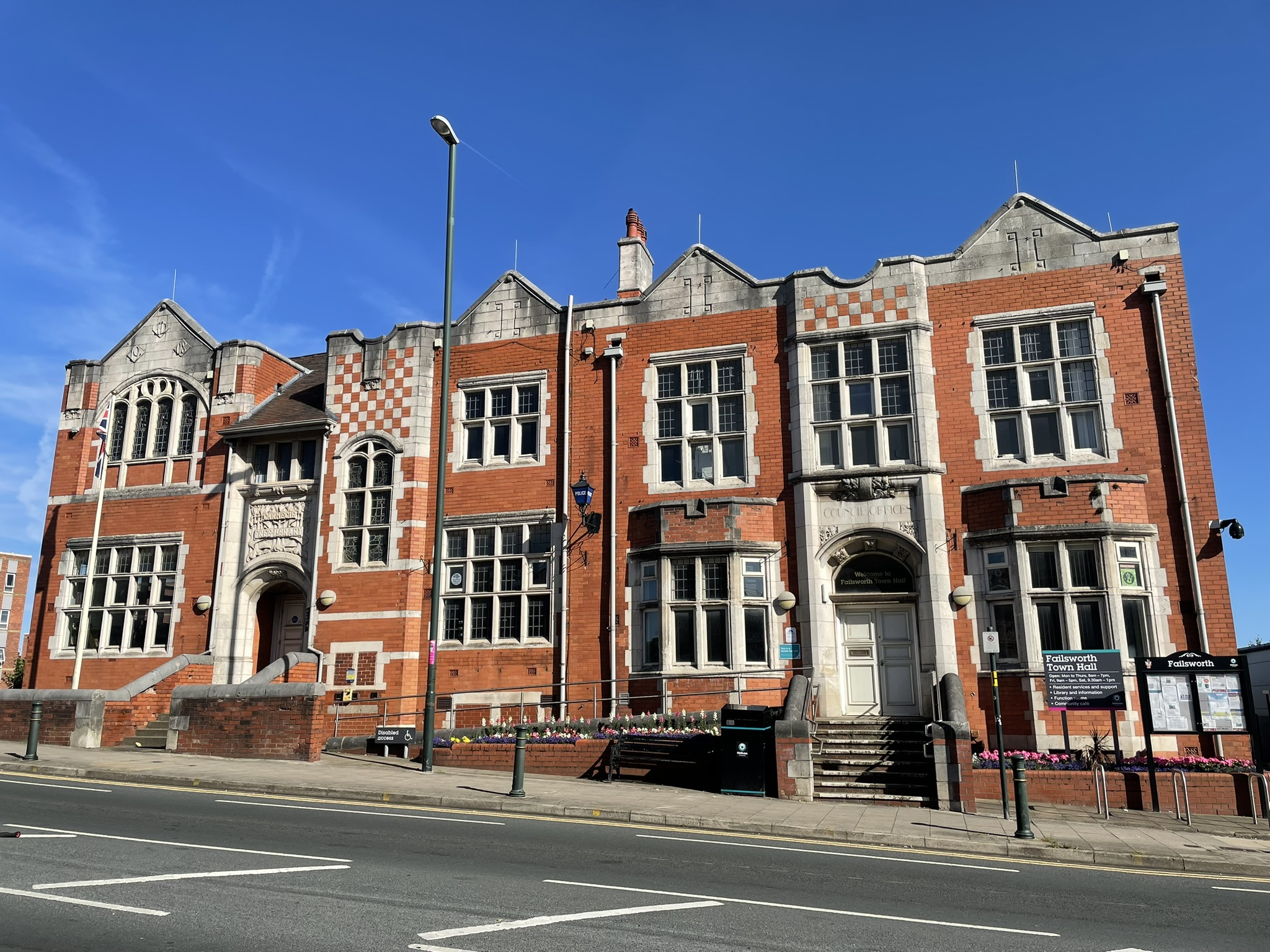
- The building in July 2025

- Shown in Greater Manchester
- 53.5103°N 2.1585°W
- Location: Failsworth, Greater Manchester

History
- Built: 1909

Site notes
- Architect(s): Ernest Ogden and Percy Cartwright Hoy
- Architectural style: Jacobean Revival style

Failsworth Town Hall, also known as Failsworth and Hollinwood District Town Hall, is a former municipal building on Oldham Road, Failsworth, a town in Greater Manchester in England. The building, which served as the offices and meeting place of Failsworth Urban District Council, now accommodates a library, a lifelong learning centre, the current council's support and housing team, and some charities.

== History ==
Following significant population growth, largely associated with the linen industry, a local board of health was established in Failsworth in 1863, with its headquarters in the Old School on Pole Lane. In the 1870s the board decided to commission dedicated offices for their meetings. The site they selected was open land on the southeast side of Oldham Road with the Rochdale Canal at the back. The building was designed by John Whittaker Firth of Oldham, built in brick at a cost of £2,600 and was completed in 1880.

In 1894, the local board of health was succeeded by Failsworth Urban District Council, which established its headquarters in the town hall. In the early 20th century, the Scottish American industrial, Andrew Carnegie, offered £3,000 to establish a public library in Failsworth. The council decided to erect the Carnegie library on an adjacent site to the northeast of the town hall. However, the opportunity was taken to remodel the façade so that the style of main frontage of the town hall was like that of the new library. The new frontage was designed by Ernest Ogden and Percy Cartwright Hoy in the Jacobean Revival style, built in red brick with Portland stone dressings and was completed in 1909. The design involved an asymmetrical main frontage of seven bays, four on the left for the Carnegie Library and three on the right for the town hall, facing onto Oldham Road. The town hall featured, in the central bay, a rounded headed doorway with an archivolt surmounted by an entablature inscribed with the words "Council Offices"; there was a mullioned and transomed window on the first floor surmounted by a chequered pattern. The outer bays were fenestrated by bay windows on the ground floor and by mullioned and transomed windows on the first floor.

The building continued to serve as the offices of Failsworth Urban District Council for much of the 20th century, but ceased to be the local seat of government when Oldham Metropolitan Borough Council was formed in 1974. The new council accommodated various departments in the building. In 2007, the final department, social services, moved out, and the building was left vacant.

The building was vandalised, but in 2011, it was restored, and a glazed extension was added, providing views over the Rochdale Canal. The building was used to house a library and a lifelong learning centre while, by 2023, it also housed the council's support and housing team, and some charities.
