= Listed buildings in Failsworth =

Failsworth is a town in the Metropolitan Borough of Oldham, Greater Manchester, England and it is unparished. It contains 15 listed buildings that are recorded in the National Heritage List for England. All the listed buildings are designated at Grade II, the lowest of the three grades, which is applied to "buildings of national importance and special interest". The listed buildings consist of houses, farmhouses and farm buildings, a former public house, an aqueduct, a church, a former cotton mill, and a war memorial.

== Buildings ==
Name and location	Photograph	Date	Notes
Medlock Hall; 53.50083°N 2.12461°W	—	17th century	A house that incorporates and earlier cruck truss, with two storeys and three bays. The left two bays are timber framed on a stone plinth, and the right bay is a gabled cross-wing in stone. In the left two bays is a porch and casement windows, and the windows in the cross-wing are mullioned with hood moulds. At the rear are 20th-century extensions and a dormer window. Inside the house is an inglenook and a bressumer.
Woodhouse Green Farmhouse and stables 53.50773°N 2.13126°W	—	17th century	The building is timber framed on a stone plinth, with brick infill, some replacement in brick, and a stone-slate roof. The main range has two storeys and three bays, and there is a wing protruding forward from the left, giving an L-shaped plan. The windows are sashes, some of them horizontally-sliding.
Diamond Hall Farmhouse; 53.50076°N 2.14175°W	—	Late 17th century	The farmhouse is in brick with a slate roof, two storeys, two bays, and extensions to the left and rear. In the centre is a gabled porch, with an elliptical-headed casement window to the left, and two later windows to the right. On the upper floor is a horizontally-sliding sash window and a later window. Other features are a small blocked arched window with a hood mould above the porch, and decorative brickwork. Inside the farmhouse is an inglenook and a bressumer.
Barn, Daisy Nook Farm; 53.50218°N 2.12651°W	—	Early 18th century	The barn is in brick on a stone plinth, with quoins, stone dressings and a stone-slate roof. There are three bays, the left bay projecting as an outshut. The barn contains two cart entries, one with a timber lintel, the other with an elliptical brick arch. There are also three blocked segmental-headed shippon doors, and three tiers of decorative ventilation holes.
Former Pack Horse Inn; 53.51233°N 2.15543°W		Early 18th century (probable)	The former public house is in stone with quoins, extensions in brick, and a slate roof. There are two storeys, the original part has two bays, a single-bay extension on both sides, and a small 20th-century extension at the rear. The central doorway has a chamfered surround and a heavy lintel, and the windows, which are casements, also have chamfered surrounds. Against the front wall is a mounting block. (Note: Street View in July 2016 shows that the public house has been converted for other uses.)
Barn, Medlock Hall; 53.50055°N 2.12471°W	—	Mid-18th century (probable)	The barn is in stone with quoins, a slate roof, three bays, and a brick bay added to the north in the 20th century. It contains a cart entry, a blocked winnowing door, two blocked doors, and two tiers of ventilation slits.
Failsworth Lodge; 53.50772°N 2.17178°W	—	1770	A house, later used for other purposes, in brick with a band, a modillion eaves cornice, and a slate roof. It has a double-depth plan, three storeys with a basement, and a front of five bays flanked by recessed two-storey wings with hipped roofs. It has a central doorway approached by opposed flights of steps with pilasters, a fanlight, and an open pediment. Most of the windows are casements, and some are sashes.
28, 30 and 32 Ashton Road West; 53.50762°N 2.16305°W	—	1791	A row of three brick houses, rendered at the left side and the rear, with a stone-slate roof. They have a double-depth plan, two storeys, four bays, and a 20th-century lean-to extension on the left. The doors and windows have segmental heads, and the windows are casements replacing workshop windows.
Waterhouses Aqueduct; 53.50423°N 2.12023°W		1792–1798	The aqueduct carries the Hollinwood Branch of the Ashton Canal over the River Medlock. It is in stone and consists of a single segmental arch. The aqueduct has two bands, a parapet wall on the side of the towpath, and square terminal piers.
Walmsley's House and Warehouse; 53.51079°N 2.15825°W		1804	Originally a warehouse, shop and house, later used for other purposes, it is in brick with a slate roof, and has an L-shaped plan. The front facing the road has a stone plinth, an eaves cornice, two storeys and five bays. In the second bay is a doorway with an architrave, a fanlight and an archivolt, to the right is a shop window, and in the right bay is a loading door. The front facing the canal is curved, and has four storeys and eight bays, and contains cross-casement windows.
St John's Church; 53.51171°N 2.15456°W		1845–46	A Commissioners' church that was designed by E. H. Shellard, with the tower added in 1879. It is in stone with a slate roof, and consists of a nave with a clerestory, north and south aisles, a north porch, a chancel flanked by an organ chamber and a vestry, and a west steeple. The steeple has a tower with four stages, angle buttresses, clock faces, corner gargoyles, and a broach spire with gabled lucarnes. The windows along the sides of the church are paired lancets under a continuous hood mould, in the clerestory are spherical triangles, and the east window has three lancets.
Firs Hall; 53.50968°N 2.16189°W	—	c. 1850	A house, later used for other purposes, in brick on a projecting plinth, with rusticated quoins, a sill band, an eaves cornice with Ionic modillions, stone dressings, and a hipped slate roof. It has an L-shaped plan with two storeys and fronts of three bays. The middle bay projects forward, it is pedimented, and contains a flat-roofed porch with corner pilasters and a modillioned entablature. The windows are sashes with architraves.
Regent Mill; 53.50891°N 2.16028°W		1906	A former steam-powered cotton spinning mill designed by George Stott, it is in brick with stone dressings. It has four storeys, fronts of 42 and five bays, and a water tower with a pyramidal roof at the northwest corner. At the rear are two-storey extensions, and the engine house projects from the southeast corner.
War memorial 53.50848°N 2.16378°W		c. 1923	The war memorial is in Portland stone, and has a square stepped plinth, an octagonal base, and a fluted column with coloured decoration, and a domed top. It is surmounted by the winged figure of Victory and a laurel wreath in bronze. On the base are inscriptions.
Church of St Mary the Immaculate Conception; 53.50469°N 2.15730°W		1963–1967	A Roman Catholic church in brick, reinforced concrete, and cast stone, with a roof in Westmorland green slate. It consists of a nave with a clerestory, narrow north and south aisles, north and south transepts containing chapels, a narthex at the liturgical west end, and a separate circular baptistry. At the entrance is a porte-cochère with a large round-headed arch containing a suspended figure of Saint Mary in aluminium. Above this is a concrete cylindrical spire with projecting fins narrowing to a point. Along the sides of the aisles are round-headed lancet windows and the clerestory windows are circular.

== Notes and references ==
=== Sources ===
- Historic England, "Medlock Hall, Failsworth (1068066)", National Heritage List for England
- Historic England, "Woodhouse Green Farmhouse and adjoining stables, Failsworth (1162661)", National Heritage List for England
- Historic England, "Diamond Hall Farmhouse, Failsworth (1309515)", National Heritage List for England
- Historic England, "Barn southwest of Daisy Nook Farmhouse, Failsworth (1162672)", National Heritage List for England
- Historic England, "Former Pack Horse Inn, Failsworth (1162698)", National Heritage List for England
- Historic England, "Barn south of Medlock Hall, Failsworth (1068067)", National Heritage List for England
- Historic England, "Failsworth Lodge (The Lancaster Sports and Social Club), Failsworth (1356453)", National Heritage List for England
- Historic England, "Nos. 28, 30 and 32 Ashton Road West, Failsworth (1068103)", National Heritage List for England
- Historic England, "Manchester and Ashton-under-Lyne Canal Hollinwood Branch Waterhouses aqueduct, Failsworth (1356454)", National Heritage List for England
- Historic England, "Walmsley's House and Warehouse, Failsworth (1068068)", National Heritage List for England
- Historic England, "Church of St John, Failsworth (1356416)", National Heritage List for England
- Historic England, "Firs Hall, Failsworth (1162692)", National Heritage List for England
- Historic England, "Regent Mill, Failsworth (1376628)", National Heritage List for England
- Historic England, "Failsworth War Memorial (1391405)", National Heritage List for England
- Historic England, "Church of St Mary the Immaculate Conception, Failsworth (1448647)", National Heritage List for England
- Hartwell, Clare; Hyde, Matthew; Pevsner, Nikolaus (2004), Lancashire: Manchester and the South-East, The Buildings of England, New Haven and London: Yale University Press, ISBN 0-300-10583-5
- Historic England, Listed Buildings
