= Alt, Greater Manchester =

Coordinates: 53.527°N 2.085°W

Alt
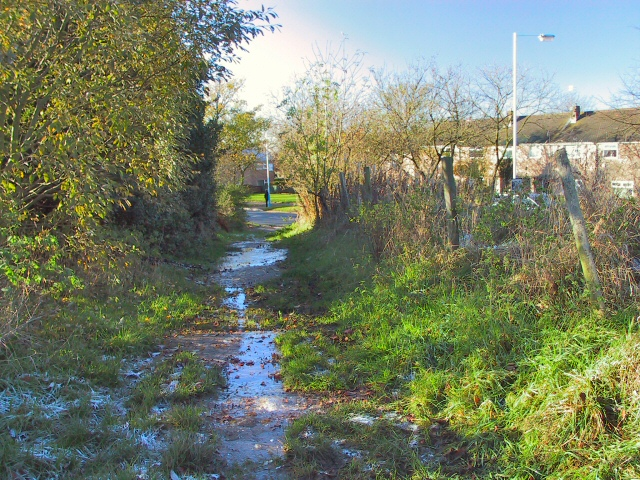
- Bridle path from County End

- Location within Greater Manchester
- OS grid reference: SD944033
- Metropolitan borough: Oldham
- Metropolitan county: Greater Manchester
- Region: North West
- Country: England
- Sovereign state: United Kingdom
- Post town: OLDHAM
- Postcode district: OL8
- Dialling code: 016
- Police: Greater Manchester
- Fire: Greater Manchester
- Ambulance: North West
- UK Parliament: Oldham East & Saddleworth

Alt is a semi-rural and suburban area lying on the borders of the towns of Oldham and Ashton-under-Lyne in Greater Manchester.

Alt was formerly a civil parish within the Limehurst Rural District until its abolition in 1954 when its territory was divided between the towns of Oldham and Ashton Under Lyne.

The Alt Estate is a large housing estate built in the 1950s around the location of Alt Fold, one of several ancient hamlets that were situated in the area. The Holts Estate, also known as Holts Village, is also within the area of the civil parish. These estates lie within the Oldham part of Alt in the north of the parish area.

== Toponymy ==
The name Alt is of Brittonic origin, and is derived from alt, meaning primarily "a cliff" or "a steep height or hill" (cf. Gaelic and Welsh allt).

== History ==
Alt is located in the historic parish of Ashton–under–Lyne. Historically part of the Hundred of Salford. The favourable topography of the old settlement (above the river) and the nearby find of a Bronze Age flint adze suggest that the area may have been occupied in prehistoric times. During the Roman period the land was probably cleared of timber for cultivation, but by about AD 550 woodland regeneration suggests a reduced population and a decline in the climate. The land was once more cleared, probably between AD 610 and 740, and finally in about AD 850.

At Domesday in AD 1086, Alt was probably a manor within the parish of Ashton. It is first recorded in the 1200s when Thomas, son of William of Alt claimed land in Palden; the name may derive from the Old Welsh for allt hill or ‘village amongst the hills'. The Old Welsh name of allt suggests the area had an existing population, a community that had survived the Anglo Saxon colonisation of the area in the 7th century AD. The name may also refer to Alder trees in the manor, locally once called owlers.

The hamlet of Alt Fold was situated at the junction of Sommerfield View, Alt Lane and Alt Fold Drive. Originating in the medieval period, was a second hamlet at Pitses, located at the junction of Holts Lane and Abbey Hills Road. James Butterworth the Oldham historian described it in the early 1800s as ‘being surrounded by pools of water'.

Throughout the medieval period the Alt area was probably arable land farmed in strips as part of an open field system, though it may also have included some pasture.

Coal mining in Alt has been known from the early 1700s with pits in Alt and Fairbottom, whilst the name Pitses may indicate the presence of early coal pits.

The abolition of Limehurst Rural District in 1954 enabled the County Borough of Oldham to extend development into the former semi rural area, building the Alt estate and its associated schools, playing fields etc. Development did not however encroach upon Alt Fold, though this ancient area was entirely cleared in the late 1960s.

== Buildings ==
South of the Alt Estate lies a semi rural area along Alt Lane. This area contains two grade II listed buildings, Alders Farmhouse and a row of early 19th century cottages known as 'Ten Houses'.

== Amenities ==
A local primary school, Alt Academy, serves Alt Estate.

The Oldham Golf Club is located within the parish area.

== Transport ==
Bee Network provides service 425 to Holts Village and to Fitton Hill via Glodwick and Oldham.
