= Woodhouse Chocolate =

Chocolate shop in Napa Valley, California, United States

Coordinates: 38.504905°N 122.470144°W

Woodhouse Chocolate is an upscale chocolate shop in St. Helena, a city in Napa Valley, California.

Woodhouse Chocolate was founded by John Anderson, a former winemaker, and his wife chocolate chef Tracy Wood Anderson in 2004, during a period where several chocolate makers were opening in California. Woodhouse Chocolate was distinct from other chocolate makers by the lighter fillings in its filled, Belgium chocolates, using fresh cream rather than ganache. Ganache had become the dominant filling as dark chocolates increased in popularity.
