= Wodehouse (disambiguation) =

P. G. Wodehouse (1881–1975) was an English humorist.

Wodehouse may also refer to:

- Wodehouse (surname)
- 4608 Wodehouse, a main-belt asteroid
- The Wodehouse, an English country house near Wombourne, Staffordshire, England, United Kingdom
- Wodehouse District, a district of Cape Province, South Africa
  - Wodehouse (House of Assembly of South Africa constituency)

== See also ==
- Wild man
