= Wolverton Common =

Hamlet in Hampshire, England

Coordinates: 51.320605°N 1.205695°W

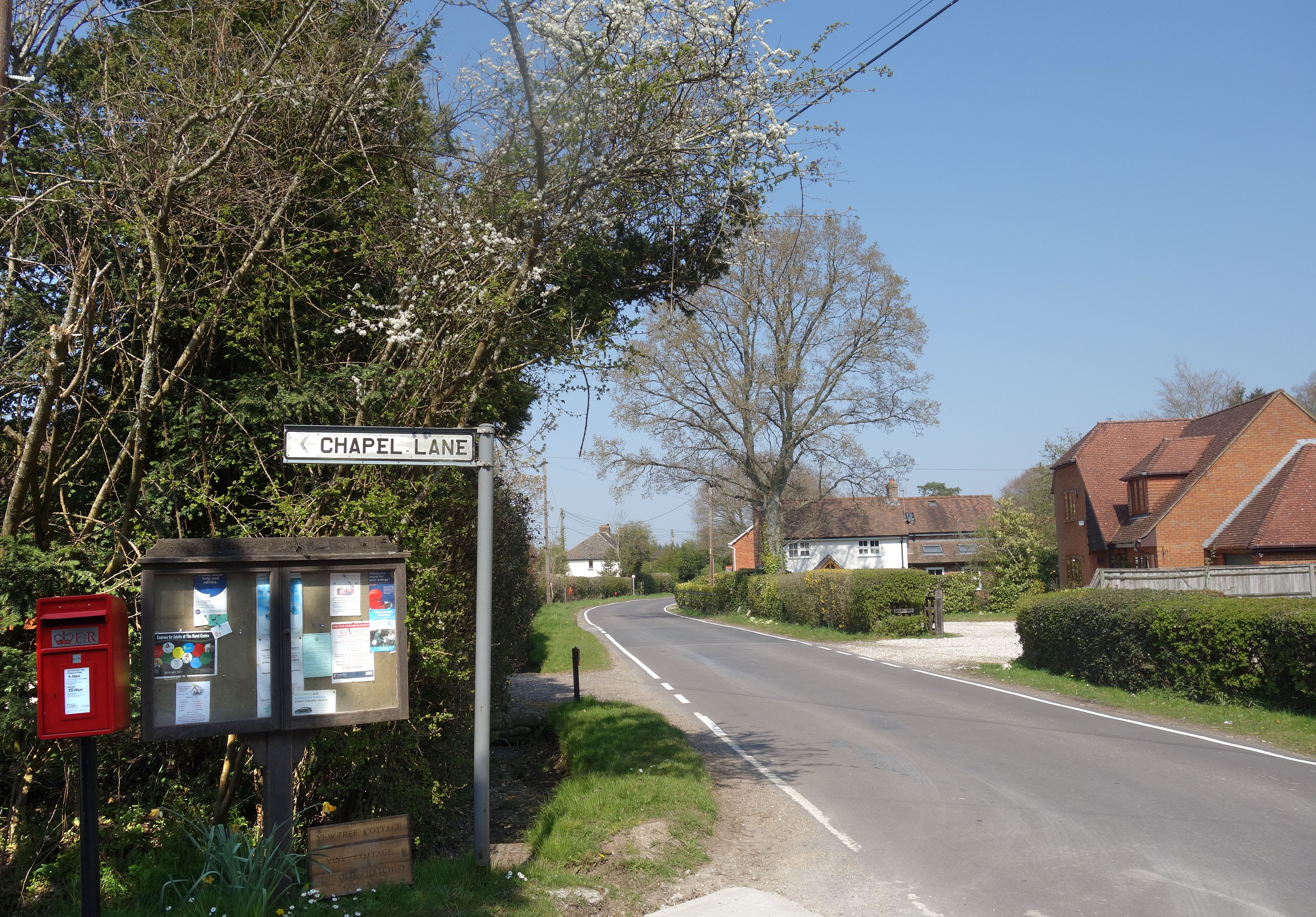
- Parish notices in Wolverton Common

- Location within Hampshire
- OS grid reference: SU5544958244
- District: Basingstoke and Deane
- Shire county: Hampshire
- Region: South East
- Country: England
- Sovereign state: United Kingdom
- Police: Hampshire and Isle of Wight
- Fire: Hampshire and Isle of Wight
- Ambulance: South Central

Wolverton Common is a hamlet in north Hampshire, England. Its nearest town is Tadley, which lies approximately 2.5 miles (4 km) east from the hamlet.
