= Woodbridge Hall =

Woodbridge Hall may refer to:

- Woodbridge Hall, Hewitt Quadrangle, Yale University, New Haven, Connecticut
- Woodbridge Hall, Reed College, Portland, Oregon
