= Justice Woodbridge =

Justice Woodbridge may refer to:

- Enoch Woodbridge (1750–1805), associate justice of the Vermont Supreme Court
- William Woodbridge (1780–1861), associate justice of the Supreme Court for the Territory of Michigan
