= Woodbridge station =

Woodbridge station may refer to:

- Woodbridge station (Virginia), an Amtrak and Virginia Railway Express station in Woodbridge, Virginia
- Woodbridge station (NJ Transit), a former Pennsylvania Railroad station on the North Jersey Coast Line in Woodbridge, New Jersey
- Woodbridge railway station, a station on the British National Rail East Suffolk Line in Woodbridge, Suffolk, England
- Woodbridge railway station, Perth, a station on the Midland Line in Western Australia
