= Woodrow, Buckinghamshire =

Hamlet in Buckinghamshire, England

Coordinates: 51.657°N 0.65°W

Woodrow is a small hamlet in the parish of Amersham in Buckinghamshire, England.

Its main landmark is Woodrow High House which is owned by the London Youth organisation. The house dates from the 17th century and is said to have housed the Cromwell family during the English Civil War. It is also said to be haunted by the ghost of Lady Helena Stanhope.
