= Co-op Academy Failsworth =

Location
- Brierley Avenue; Failsworth, Greater Manchester, M35 9HA; England; 53.507630°N 2.146633°W

Information
- Type: Academy
- Motto: Achieving Excellence Together
- Local authority: Oldham
- Department for Education URN: 144627 Tables
- Ofsted: Reports
- Headteacher: Rebecca Shaw
- Gender: Co-educational
- Age: 11 to 16
- Enrolment: 1,450
- Colours: Grey, White
- Website: Co-op Academy Failsworth

Co-op Academy Failsworth, formerly Failsworth School, is a co-educational secondary school admitting children between 11 and 16 years of age. The school is located in Failsworth, Greater Manchester.

== School history ==
New school buildings were opened in 2008 at a cost of £28 million.

In 2010 the school was found to be in deficit of £582,000.

In 2014 the school was judged Inadequate. In 2016 the judgement improved to Requires Improvement.

The school became an academy as part of the Co-operative Academies Trust in 2017.

In 2024, the school was judged Good by Ofsted.

== Academic performance ==
In 2018 the school's Progress 8 benchmark was "well below average". 28% of pupils achieved grade 5 or above in English and math GCSEs, compared to 36% in the local authority area and 40% nationally. The school did not meet the government's minimum standards at GCSE ("floor target").

== Notable former pupils ==
- Nathan Eccleston – Footballer, formerly of Liverpool and Blackpool.
- James Mudriczki – Singer, Puressence.
- Tony Szuminski – Musician, Puressence.
- James Tarkowski – England capped footballer currently playing for Premier League side Everton.
- Darren Wharton – Musician who is a member of Thin Lizzy and Dare.
- Ronnie Wallwork, Former professional footballer who won the Premier League with Manchester United. Wallwork also played for West Bromwich Albion and Sheffield Wednesday
