= Woodridge Estates, Alberta =

Woodridge Estates, Alberta may refer to:

- Woodridge Estates, Parkland County, Alberta, a locality in Parkland County, Alberta
- Woodridge Estates, Sturgeon County, Alberta, a locality in Sturgeon County, Alberta
