= Woodford, Northamptonshire =

Village in Northamptonshire, England

Woodford
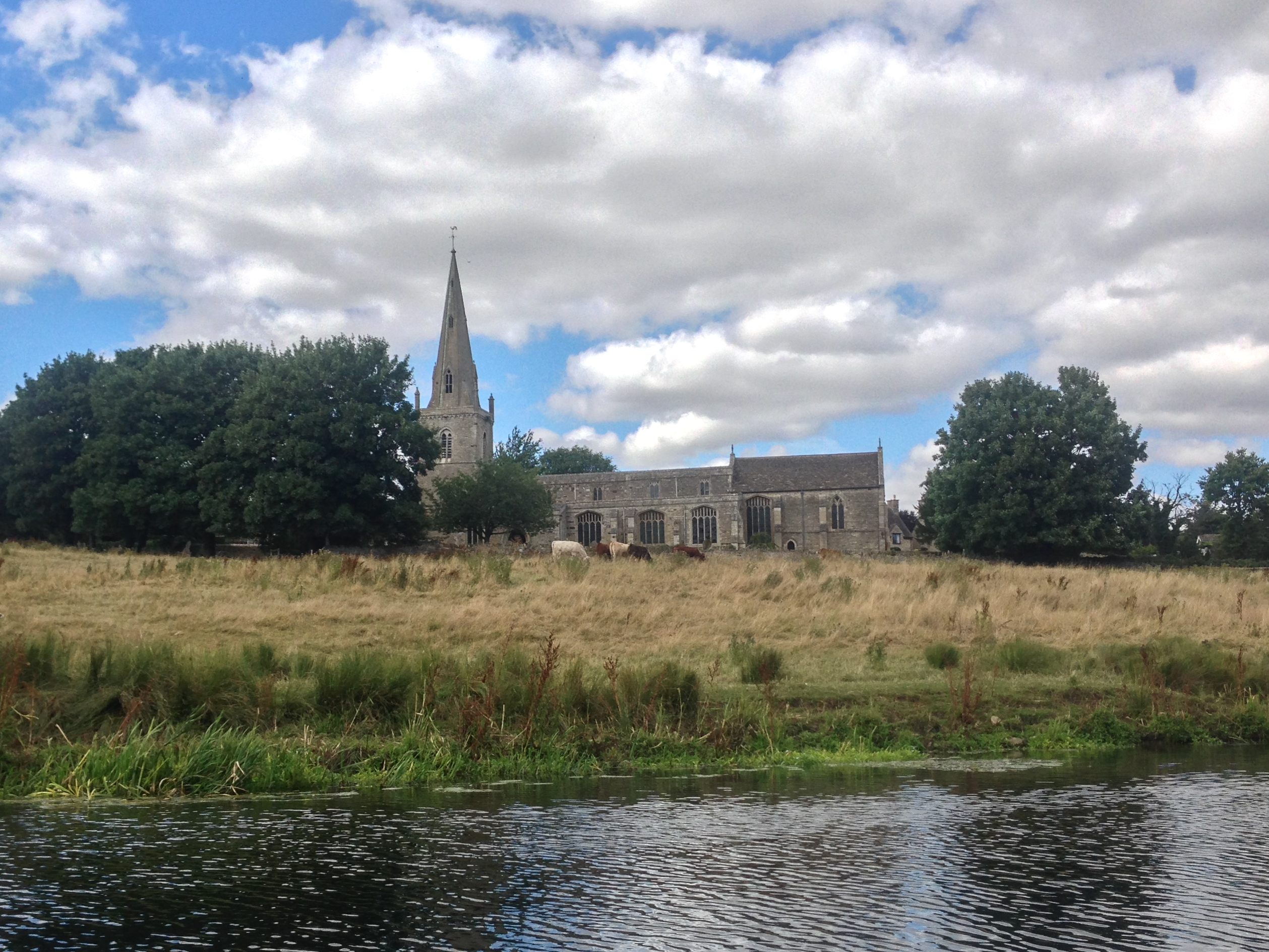
- Church of St. Mary the Virgin seen from the River Nene

- Location within Northamptonshire
- Population: 1,461 (2011 census)
- OS grid reference: SP9676
- Unitary authority: North Northamptonshire
- Ceremonial county: Northamptonshire
- Region: East Midlands
- Country: England
- Sovereign state: United Kingdom
- Post town: Kettering
- Postcode district: NN14
- Dialling code: 01832
- Police: Northamptonshire
- Fire: Northamptonshire
- Ambulance: East Midlands
- UK Parliament: Corby and East Northamptonshire

Woodford is a large village and civil parish located in North Northamptonshire, England. At the time of the 2011 census, the parish's population (including Woodwell) was 1,461 people.

The village has one public house, The Dukes Arms, located on the village green

== Naming ==
The village's name means 'wooded ford', referring to woodland near a shallow fording place on the River Nene.

== Geography ==
It is in two distinct parts, the easterly, lower, part being alongside the River Nene and the westerly, upper, part is on the through road out of the Nene valley. Its parish church is dedicated to St Mary the Virgin and has the nickname "the Cathedral of the Nene".

=== Church ===
Inside the church can be found a number of curiosities. Within a niche cut into a pillar, there is a mummified human heart wrapped in coarse cloth. This was discovered during restoration work in 1867. A framed newspaper cutting depicts a photograph of an alleged ghost taken in the church in 1964. A further display shows reproductions of photographs and newspapers from a time capsule concealed in the roof by the Reverend Smythe during the 1867 repair works, and rediscovered during further repairs in 1995. An unusual carving (particularly for places of Christian worship) can be found at the top of one of the pillars to the rear of the nave, depicting a Green Man, with vines growing out of the mouth. Finally, the combination of rounded and pointed arches in the nave indicate different periods of reconstruction in the Norman and Gothic styles respectively.

=== Woodford House ===
Woodford House, an early 19th-century mansion, was the home of the Arbuthnot family and scene of the death of the diarist Harriet Arbuthnot in 1834. The property was purchased in 1880 by Charles Henry Plevins from Arthur Arbuthnot, son of General Charles Arbuthnot. The house was altered between 1899 and 1910 and had a new garden created in 1909.

=== Quarries ===
The Arbuthnots owned iron ore quarries on the estate which were dug from circa 1851, an early date for what was later to become a large industry in Northamptonshire. The Arbuthnot's quarry appears to have been short-lived but a sample of the ore was exhibited at the Great Exhibition in Hyde Park, London, in 1851. There was a further experiment in commercial quarrying from about 1860 and again in 1866. The early attempts suffered from a lack of transport facilities and the ore must have been taken away by horse and cart but in 1866 the Kettering to Thrapston railway opened and a connecting tramway was constructed from close to Woodford House to the railway at Twywell. The quarrying (and some adit mining) lasted from 1866 to 1886, starting near Woodford Lodge and extending north of the road later on. There were also quarries south west of Twywell Station on the north side of the road between 1881 and 1883. There was also a brickworks near there. The main tramway (standard gauge) had steam locomotives from the start but some of the quarries were connected to it by narrow gauge lines and these were worked by hand or by horse until 1883. There were some visible remains of the quarries and buildings at least until 1986.

Part of the ground north of the road near Woodford Lodge was reworked between 1914 and 1926 when quarries in Twywell Parish were extended. The ground here was landscaped and returned to cultivation in 1965.

These quarries were to the west of Woodford village. Another quarry to the north of the village operated from 1867 but was closed by 1892. This quarry was connected to a tipping dock on the railway east of Twywell Station by a horse operated 4 foot gauge tramway. No landscaping was undertaken until 1970 and there were still some traces of the quarry as at 1986

== Heritage assets ==
The following buildings and structures are listed by Historic England as of special architectural or historic interest.

- Three Hills Round Barrows (Scheduled) Bronze Age 52.37368°N 0.58967°W
- Bowl Barrow north of Woodford Mill (Scheduled) Bronze Age 52.37274°N 0.57113°W
- Remains of Manor House and Garden (Scheduled) Unknown date 52.38249°N 0.57186°W
- Medieval settlement remains (Scheduled) 9th century 52.37899°N 0.57961°W
- Church of St Mary (Grade I) from 12th century onwards 52.38006°N 0.57729°W
- Glebe Farmhouse (Grade I) 13th century 52.38030°N 0.57743°W
- Wall with Finial south of Church of St Mary (Grade II) 14th century 52.37972°N 0.57723°W
- Dovecote south of Manor Farmhouse (Grade II) 17th century 52.38090°N 0.58130°W
- Manor House Farmhouse (Grade II*) 17th century 52.38090°N 0.58130°W
- Woodford Rise (Grade II) 17th century with additions of the early 19th century and 1930s 52.37971°N 0.57850°W
- 50, 52 and 54 High Street (Grade II) 17th century 52.38279°N 0.58209°W
- 84 High Street (Grade II) 17th century 52.38168°N 0.58104°W
- Daventry Farmhouse and attached Outbuilding (Grade II) 17th century 52.38197°N 0.57986°W
- Cheyham Cottage (Grade II) 17th century 52.38124°N 0.57608°W
- Club Lane (Grade II) 18th century 52.38099°N 0.57802°W
- Woodford Mill (Grade II) 18th century 52.36661°N 0.57155°W
- 82 and Part of Number 84 over Carriage Arch (Grade II) 18th century 52.38181°N 0.58112°W
- Woodford House, attached Cottages and Outbuildings (Grade II) 18th century 52.37724°N 0.61691°W
- Olde Ways (Grade II) 18th century 52.38135°N 0.57811°W
- Chest Tomb south of Church of St Mary (Grade II) 18th century 52.37988°N 0.57710°W
- The Rectory (Grade II) 19th century (1820) 52.37926°N 0.57834°W
- 72 and 74 High Street (Grade II) 19th century 52.38221°N 0.58142°W
- The Round House and attached Barn (Grade II) 19th century 52.36407°N 0.62825°W
- 70 High Street (Grade II) 19th century 52.38226°N 0.58154°W
- War Memorial at Church of St Mary (Grade II) 20th century 52.38003°N 0.57751°W
- War Memorial on The Green (Grade II) 20th century 52.38211°N 0.58100°W

St Mary's Church was begun in the 12th century and has 13th,14th and 19th century features. The tower was complete by 1400.

The Manor House, although a 16th-century house has buttresses and a doorway of the 13th or early 14th century.

The Round House is dated 1815 and commemorates the Battle of Waterloo

Woodford House was enlarged between 1813 and 1826 and in 1902.

== Demography ==
- In 1801 there were 491 inhabitants
- In 1831 there were 639 inhabitants
- In 1841 there were 680 inhabitants
- In 2011 there were 1,461 inhabitants
