= List of road junctions in the United Kingdom: P =

This is a partial list of road junctions in the United Kingdom.

Many road junctions are named after pubs. For more information regarding the derivation of pub names, see pub names.

== P ==
Junction Name	Type	Location	Roads	Grid Reference	Notes
Pagoda		Newlands, Milton Keynes	H5 Portway; V10 Brickhill Street	52°03′16″N 0°43′41″W	
Painshill		Cobham, Surrey	A3 Portsmouth Road; A245 Byfleet Road	51°20′05″N 0°25′41″W	
Palm Court Island		Allestree, Derby	A38 Queensway; A38 Abbey Hill; A6 Duffield Road; Kings Croft		
Panners Interchange		Braintree, Essex	A120; A131; B1256 Pod's Brook Road	TL746221	named after the nearby farm
Park Circus		Birmingham, West Midlands	A38(M) Aston Expressway; Victoria Road; B4132 Waterlinks Boulevard	SP080894	
Park Royal Junction		Park Royal, London	A406 North Circular Road; unclass.	51°32′21″N 0°16′44″W	
Park Square		Sheffield	A61 Exchange Place; A61 Sheaf Street; A57; A6135 Duke Street; B6072 Broad Street; Commercial Street	53°22′59″N 1°27′37″W	
Park Street Roundabout	Roundabout	Park Street, St Albans	M10 J1; A414 (formerly A405) North Orbital Road; A405 North Orbital Road; A5183 (formerly A5)	51°43′58″N 0°20′41″W	Notable for appearing as the roundabout sign in the Highway Code, albeit in slightly modified form
Parkers Cross		near Looe, Cornwall	A387; unclass.	SX232530	
Parliament Square		London	A302; A3212	51°30′03″N 0°07′36″W	
Parson's Corner		Shoeburyness, Southend-on-Sea (formerly in Essex)	A13 Bournes Green Chase; A13 North Shoebury Road; B1017 Poynters Lane; Bishopsteignton	51°32′41″N 0°46′39″E	
Partney Pumps		Partney, Lincolnshire	A16 Partney Road; A158 Sausthorpe Road	53°11′24″N 0°06′08″E	Named after the service station on the junction outside Partney
Patcham Interchange	Dumbbell roundabouts, with link to Mill Road Roundabout at the end of the A23.	Brighton & Hove	A23 London Road; Baypool Lane; A27; Vale Avenue; London Road; Mill Lane	50°52′07″N 0°09′15″W	Dumbbell roundabouts above the A27, with a spur down to the Mill Road Roundabout at the end of the A23. Additionally there is a free-flow link from the A27 eastbound to A23 northbound.
Patterson's Cross		Gosford, Devon	A30; Gosford Road; unclass. road to Feniton	SY096977	
Paynes Hall Roundabout: aka Westmill Roundabout	Roundabout	Tonwell, Hertfordshire	A602 Ware Road; B158 Wadesmill Road; Anchor Lane (formerly B158)	TL337166	Named after the house next to the junction
Peacehaven Roundabout	Roundabout	Peacehaven, East Sussex	A259 South Coast Road; Sutton Avenue; A259 South Coast Road	TQ 40731 01064	
Pearce's Hill		Exeter, Devon	M5 J31; A30; A38	50°40′49″N 3°30′59″W	
Pear Tree		Oxford, Oxfordshire	A34 Western Bypass Road; A44 Woodstock Road	51°47′39″N 1°17′10″W	
Pease Pottage Junction		Crawley, West Sussex	M23 J11; A23 Brighton Road; A264; B2114	TQ263335	
Peckfield Bar		Micklefield, West Yorkshire	A63 Selby Road; A656 Ridge Road	SE430316	
Pedlar's Corner		Lawford, Essex	B1035 Clacton Road; Dead Lane	TM106307	
Pelean Cross		Ponsanooth, Cornwall	A393; Tresamble Hill; Tubbon Hill; unclass.	SW755385	
Pellen's Corner		Little Bentley, Essex	A120 Harwich Road (formerly A604); Bentley Road	TM113266	
Penberthy Cross		Penberthy, Cornwall	Long Lane; unclass.	SW552329	
Pendeen Road Corner		Newbridge, Cornwall	A3071; B3318	50.1290°N 5.6306°W	
Pengelly Cross		Binner Downs, Cornwall	B3302; unclass.	SW614324	
Penn Inn Roundabout	Signal-controlled roundabout	Newton Abbot, Devon	A380 Besigheim Way/Torquay Road; A381 Torquay Road; Shaldon Road (unclass)	50.5247°N 3.5934°W	Named after the adjacent pub
Penn Road Island		Wolverhampton	A4150 Ring Road; A449 Penn Road; Worcester Street; School Street	52°34′51″N 2°07′57″W	Worcester Street one-way on to island only. School Street is one-way off island only.
The Pentagon		Chaddesden, Derbyshire	A52 Eastgate; A61 Sir Frank Whittle Road; Nottingham Road; Derbyshire County Cricket Club; Chequers Road	SK363365	
Pepperstock	Roundabout Interchange	Luton, Bedfordshire	M1 J10; M1 Spur to J10a	51°51′13″N 0°25′25″W	
Percival Way Roundabout		Luton, Bedfordshire	Airport Way; Percival Way	51°52′35″N 0°22′51″W	Now removed and being replaced by a pair of roundabouts
Percy Circus		Kings Cross, LB Camden	Great Percy Street; Vernon Road	51°31′45″N 0°06′51″W	
Piccadilly Circus		London	A4 Piccadilly; A401 Shaftesbury Avenue; A4201 Regent Street	51°30′36″N 0°08′06″W	
Picket Post Gate		Warminster, Wiltshire	A362; unclass.	51°11′43″N 2°13′41″W	
Picknage Corner		Barley, Hertfordshire	B1039 Chishill Road; B1039 Picknage Road; Church End	52°01′39″N 0°02′37″E	
Pineham Roundabout		Pineham, Milton Keynes	H5 Portway; V11 Tongwell Street	52°03′17″N 0°42′45″W	
Pirbright Bridge Junction		Brookwood, Surrey	A324 Connaught Road; A324 Dawney Hill; B3012 Gole Road	SU944568	
Pirnhall Interchange		Bannockburn, Stirling	M9 J9; M80 J6; A91; A872	NS806888	
Pirton Cross	Crossroads	Hitchin, Hertfordshire	B655 Hexton Road; B655 Pirton Road; Hitchin Road; Carters Lane (Wibbly Wobbley Lane)	51°56′59″N 0°18′39″W	
Pitland Corner		near Lamerton, Devon	unclass.; unclass.	SX472778	
Pitsea Roundabout		Pitsea, near Basildon, Essex	A13; A132 South Mayne; B1464 Broadway Link (spur of London Road, former A13; Pitsea Hall Lane	TQ737879	
Pitts Head Crossroads		Warninglid, West Sussex	A23; B2115 Sloughgreen Lane; B2115 Cuckfield Lane	TQ267259	
Pity Me Roundabout		Pity Me, Durham, County Durham	A167; Potterhouse Lane; Rotary Way; Front Street Pity Me	54°48′21″N 1°35′21″W	
The Plain		Oxford	St. Clement's; Cowley Road; Iffley Road; Magdalen Bridge, High Street	SP523060	
Plantation Road Interchange		Glasgow	M8 J22; M77	55°51′01″N 4°17′36″W	webcam
Plaw Hatch Corner	Crossroads	Bishop's Stortford	A1250 Dunmow Road; Parsonage Road; Manor Links	51°52′21″N 0°11′06″E	
The Plough Roundabout	Magic Roundabout	Hemel Hempstead, Hertfordshire	A414 Station Road; A414 Two Waters Road; A414 St. Albans Road; A4146 Leighton Buzzard Road; Lawn Lane	51°44′47″N 0°28′24″W	Named for public house to east of site, also known as Moor End Roundabout and colloquially as the Magic Roundabout
Podimore Roundabout		Podimore, Somerset	* A303: A37; A372; unclass.	ST536251	Locally called 'Podimore Cross' from the days before the roundabout
The Polish War Memorial		Northolt, London	A40 Western Avenue; A4180 West End Road	51°32′54″N 0°23′58″W	Named after the memorial to the Polish airmen located to commemorate those who died during the Second World War (they were stationed at Northolt)
Polmadie Road Junction		Glasgow	M74 J1A; A730 New Rutherglen Road (for A728 Clyde Gateway); B763 Polmadie Road	55.8378°N 4.2408°W	
Polvean Cross		Duloe, Cornwall	B3254; unclass.	SX233588	
Pont Abraham		Llannon, Wales	M4 J49; A48; A483	51°44′42″N 4°03′50″W	
Portfield Roundabout	Roundabout	Chichester, West Sussex	A27 Chichester Bypass; A258 Portfield Way; Chichester Bypass; A27 Arundel Road	SU 87762 05449	Named on road signage
Porth Four Turns	Double Roundabout	Newquay, Cornwall	A3058 Henver Road; B3376 Porth Way; unclass. Trevenson Road	50.4184°N 5.0567°W	
Portherras Cross	Crossroads	Pendeen, Cornwall	B3306 St Ives Road; B3318 Boscaswell Downs; unclass. Calartha Road	50.1528°N 5.6579°W	
Portsbridge Roundabout		Portsmouth, Hampshire	M27; A27 Western Road; A3 London Road; A397 Northern Road (formerly A3); A27 Havant Bypass	SU654046	
Portway Island		Portway, Worcestershire	M42 J3; A435 Alcester Road; Forshaw Heath Lane	SP079730	
Portway Roundabout		Loughton, Milton Keynes	A5; H5 (A509) Portway	52°02′15″N 0°46′54″W	
Pouncers Cross	T junction	Chawleigh, Mid Devon	B3042; unclass., to Lapford	50.8878°N 3.7905°W	Named on fingerpost
Pound Cross		Pound, Bickleigh Parish, Devon	Common Lane; unclass.	SX486639	
Pound Roundabout: aka Cattle Pound Roundabout		Castlemartin, Pembrokeshire	B4319; unclass.	51°38′42″N 5°00′49″W	
Pound Roundabout		Hayling Island, Hampshire	A3023 Havant Road; A3023 Manor Road; Church Road	50°48′02″N 0°58′32″W	
Pratt's Bottom		Pratt's Bottom, LB Bromley	A21 Sevenoaks Road; Rushmore Hill	51°20′40″N 0°06′40″E	
Preeze Cross		Cardinham, Cornwall	A30; unclass.	SX115711	
Preston Cross		Preston, Forest of Dean, Gloucestershire	A449; A4172 (formerly A4215); B4215 (formerly A4215)	SO675354	
Prince Albert Roundabout	Roundabout	Royal Albert, LB Newham	A1020 Royal Albert Way; Stansfeld Road; Dockside Road	TQ421808	
Prince Regent		Custom House, LB Newham	A13 Newham Way; A112 Prince Regent Lane; Tollgate Road	TQ411817	
Prince of Wales Roundabout	Roundabout Interchange	Marks Tey, Essex	A12 London Road (S/B); A120 Prince Regent Lane; B1408 London Road (formerly A12)	TL919239	
Princes' Road Interchange		Dartford, Kent	A282 Dartford Tunnel Approach Road J1b; A296 Princes Road	51°26′17″N 0°14′19″E	
Princes' Way Roundabout		Bletchley, Milton Keynes	V7 Saxon Street; Princes' Way	51°59′51″N 0°44′02″W	
Priory Wood Roundabout	Roundabout Interchange	Birchanger, Essex	M11 J8A; A120 Thremhall Avenue; Round Coppice Road	TL523217	
Provan		Glasgow	M8 J13; M80 J1; Provan Road; Maxwelton Road; Blochairn Road	55°52′16″N 4°11′57″W	webcam
Pulla Cross		Frogpool, Cornwall	Tresamble Hill; Quakers Road; unclass.	SW754399	
Punch's Cross		Hitchin, Hertfordshire	Hitchin Road; Icknield Way	51°57′31″N 0°19′11″W	
Purley Cross		Purley, London Borough of Croydon	A23 Brighton Road; A23 Purley Way; A22 Purley Road; A2022 Banstead Road; A235 Brighton Road	51°20′19″N 0°07′02″W	
