= Woodside, County Durham =

Village in County Durham, England

Coordinates: 54.6625°N 1.7248°W

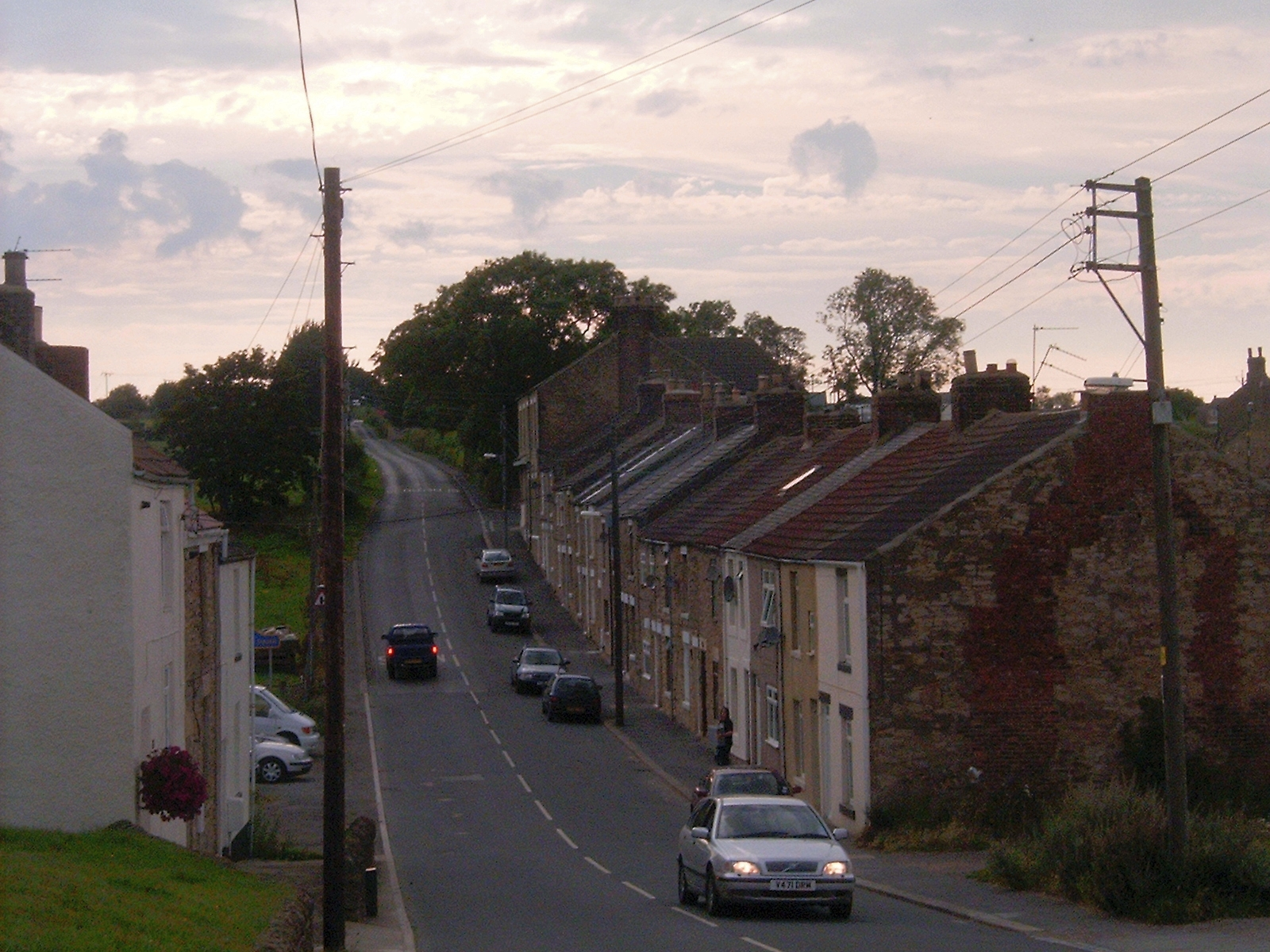
The main street through Woodside

Woodside is a village in County Durham, England. It is situated 2 miles (3 km) to the west of Bishop Auckland. In the 2001 census Woodside had a population of 153.
