= Woodwell =

Hamlet in Northamptonshire, England

Coordinates: 52.3879°N 0.6017°W

- Location within Northamptonshire
- OS grid reference: SP952775
- Unitary authority: North Northamptonshire
- Ceremonial county: Northamptonshire
- Region: East Midlands
- Country: England
- Sovereign state: United Kingdom
- Post town: Kettering
- Postcode district: NN14
- Dialling code: 01832
- Police: Northamptonshire
- Fire: Northamptonshire
- Ambulance: East Midlands
- UK Parliament: Corby and East Northamptonshire

Woodwell is a hamlet in the English county of Northamptonshire, about a mile west of the village of Woodford. It is at the end of a cul-de-sac lane.
