= Woodhouses =

Coordinates: 53.5032°N 2.1377°W

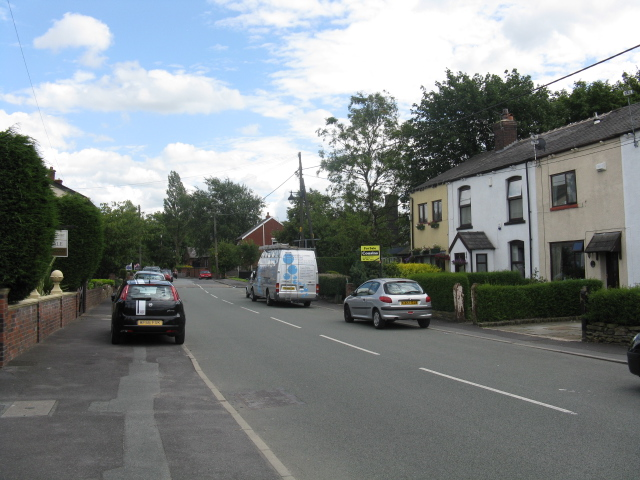
- Ashton Lane

- Location within Greater Manchester
- Area: 0.2521 km^{2} (0.0973 sq mi)
- Population: 1,094 (2021 census)
  - Density: 4,340/km^{2} (11,200/sq mi)
- Metropolitan borough: Oldham
- Metropolitan county: Greater Manchester
- Region: North West
- Country: England
- Sovereign state: United Kingdom

Woodhouses is an area in Failsworth, in the Oldham district of Greater Manchester (which was part of Lancashire until 1974), England. It is about 5 miles (8 km) miles from Manchester city centre. In 2021 it had a population of 1094. Woodhouses Conservation Area includes most of the village and was designated in 1975.

== Amenities ==
Woodhouses has a church called Woodhouses Mission Church, a school called Woodhouses Voluntary Controlled Primary, 3 pubs and a golf club.

== History ==
The name "Woodhouses" probably means 'an enclosure surrounded by woods'. Woodhouses was formerly in the parish of Ashton-under-Lyne. On 31 December 1894 Woodhouses became a civil parish in its own right with a population of 677 in 1951. On 1 April 1954 the parish was abolished and merged with Failsworth and Oldham.
