= Woodacott =

Village in Devon, England

Coordinates: 50.84614°N 4.29968°W

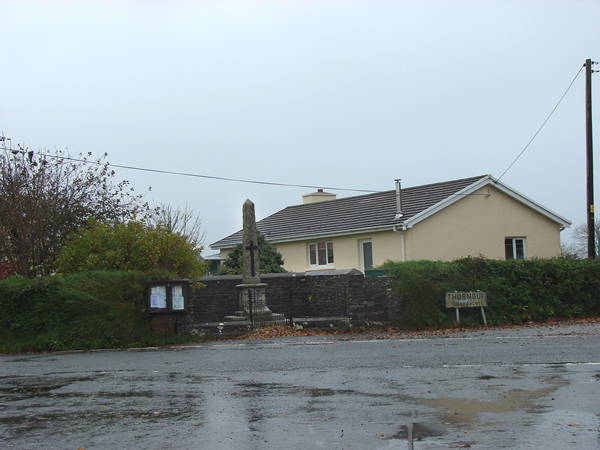
The War memorial at Woodacott Cross

Woodacott is a small village in Devon, England. The nearest shops are in Holsworthy, about four miles to the south-west of Woodacott. The village is less than a ¼ mile to the west of Woodacott Cross, and they are normally regarded as the same village.

Woodacott is in the civil parish of the nearby village of Thornbury. The nearest separate settlement to Woodacott is Thornbury. To the north of Woodacott lies the village of Milton Damerel, to the east Thornbury and Shebbear, to the south-east Cookbury, and to the west Holsworthy Beacon.
