= Failsworth =

Town in Greater Manchester, England

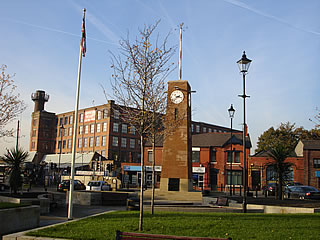
- Failsworth Pole

- Location within Greater Manchester
- Population: 20,680 (2011 Census)
- OS grid reference: SD895015
  - London: 163 mi (262 km) SSE
- Metropolitan borough: Oldham
- Metropolitan county: Greater Manchester
- Region: North West
- Country: England
- Sovereign state: United Kingdom
- Post town: MANCHESTER
- Postcode district: M35
- Dialling code: 0161
- Police: Greater Manchester
- Fire: Greater Manchester
- Ambulance: North West
- UK Parliament: Manchester Central

Failsworth (/ˈfeɪlzwɜːrθ/) is a town in the Metropolitan Borough of Oldham, Greater Manchester, England, 4 miles (6.4 km) north-east of Manchester and 3 miles (4.8 km) south-west of Oldham. The M60 ring-road motorway skirts it to the east. The population at the 2011 census was 20,680. Historically in Lancashire, Failsworth until the 19th century was a farming township linked ecclesiastically with Manchester. Inhabitants supplemented their farming income with domestic hand-loom weaving. The humid climate and abundant labour and coal led to weaving of textiles as a Lancashire Mill Town with redbrick cotton mills. A current landmark is the Failsworth Pole. Daisy Nook is a country park on the southern edge.

== Toponymy ==
Failsworth derives from the Old English fegels and worth, probably meaning an "enclosure with a special kind of fence".

== History ==
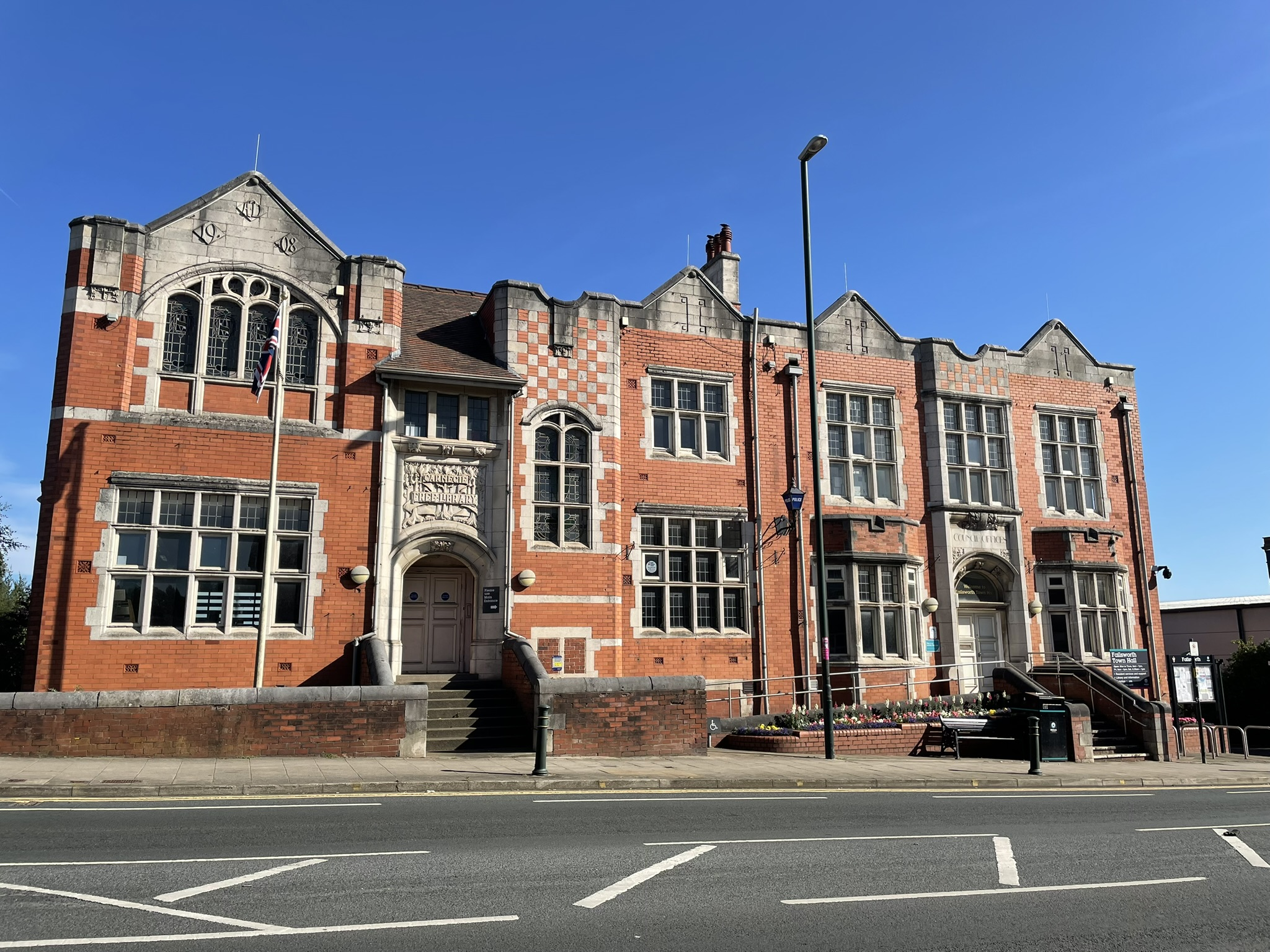
Failsworth Town Hall

Early settlement rested on a road that runs today between Manchester and Yorkshire. This Roman secondary road formed part of a network from Manchester up north, probably to Tadcaster near York. The section that ran through Failsworth is still known as Roman Road. It was built above marshland and laid on brushwood with a hard surface. Roman Road has also been known as "Street", a Saxon term meaning "metalled road", indicating that it was also used that later period.

Early sources suggest the area was occupied in Saxon times. The small hamlet of scattered dwellings made of rough local stone, mud and clay with thatched roofs, may have been stood on ground higher than the surrounding marshland. Daily life would have centred on animal husbandry and agriculture.

Unmentioned in the Domesday Book of 1086, Failsworth appears in a record of 1212 as Fayleswrthe, a settlement was documented as a thegnage estate or manor comprising four oxgangs of land. Two oxgangs at an annual rate of 4 shillings were payable by the tenant, Gilbert de Notton, to Adam de Prestwich, who in turn paid tax to King John. The other two oxgangs were held by the Lord of Manchester as part of his fee simple. The Byron family came to acquire the whole township in the mid-13th century. Apart from a small estate held by Cockersand Abbey, Failsworth passed to the Chetham family and was then sold on to smaller holders.

By 1663, 50 households were registered. Life centred on natural resources, agriculture and stock farming, with many were employed as labourers to work the land, though tradesmen such as a tailor, a felt maker, a shoemaker, a joiner and a weaver supported them. The earliest record of a place of worship is Dob Lane Chapel, dating from 1698.

In 1774, the 242 Failsworth households contained some 1.400 inhabitants, of whom a high proportion were involved in cloth manufacture. Development of the English textile trade was backed by important legislation between 1500 and 1760: a number of acts were passed to encourage it by the compulsory growing of flax. Grants were made to flax growers and duties levied on foreign imports, though Manchester's extensive linen trade used yarn imported from Holland and Ireland.

In 1914 the regular Daisy Nook Easter Fair ceased with the outbreak of the First World War, but resumed in 1920. On 8 June 2007, a 1946 work by L. S. Lowry entitled "Good Friday, Daisy Nook" sold for £3,772,000, then the highest bid ever paid for one of his paintings.

=== Timeline ===
Timeline of Failsworth
- 1212 – First official record of Failsworth in King John's Great Inquest of Service
- 1212 – North-western portion of land held by the Lord of the Manor of Prestwick
- 1212 – South-eastern portion of land held by the Lords of the Manor of Manchester
- Mid-13th century – Richard and Robert de Byron acquired both portions of land
- 1320 – First record of a named place in Failsworth: Wrigley Head named in the Survey of the Manor of Manchester
- 1600–1699 – Population mostly working the land and supported by production of cloth
- 1660 – 43 names registered in the town
- 1663 – 50 recorded families
- 1673 – Earliest record of a place of worship: Dob Lane Chapel
- 1700–1799 – Most inhabitants involved in producing linen cloth, others farming
- 1735 – Manchester, Oldham and Austerlands Turnpike Trust improves the road between them.
- 1774 – 242 families recorded, with a population 1,400
- 1793 – The first Failsworth Pole erected
- 1796 – The earliest day school recorded is Pole Lane School.
- 1801 – Population 2,622
- 1803 – The main Turnpike Road is widened to 60 feet from Manchester to Dob Lane End.
- 1804 – Rochdale Canal opens on 21 December.
- 1825 – The first cotton mill built
- 1839 – The first mill built by Henry Walmsley
- 1844 – Failsworth constitutes a new parish: St John's.
- 1850 – A second Failsworth Pole erected
- 1851 – Population is 4,433
- 1859 – Failsworth Industrial Society is officially registered on 22 July.
- 1863 – The first Local Government Board is founded with nine members.
- 1878 – Horse-drawn trams are introduced between Manchester and Hollinwood.
- 1880 – A railway opens between Oldham and Manchester.
- 1881 – Failsworth acquires its first railway station in April.
- 1889 – A third Failsworth Pole erected
- 1894 – The Local Board is superseded by Failsworth Urban District Council.
- 1901 – Population 14,152
- 1901 – Electric trams replace the horse-drawn ones.
- 1903 – Merger with Manchester proposed
- 1904 – Merger with Manchester deferred
- 1924 – A fourth Failsworth Pole erected
- 1937 – The Roxy cinema presents its first feature on 20 December.
- 1946 – Failsworth Urban District Council proceeds with a housing clearance programme.
- 1946 – The last tram runs in Oldham.
- 1958 – The fifth and present Failsworth Pole erected
- 1973 – Failsworth is officially twinned with Landsberg am Lech in Germany.
- 1974 – Failsworth becomes part of the Metropolitan Borough of Oldham.
- 1991 – Population 20,999
- 1993 – The bicentenary of the first Failsworth Pole is marked.
- 2000 – The M60 motorway link opens.

== Governance ==
The coat of arms of the former Failsworth Urban District council

Lying within the historic county boundaries of Lancashire since the early 12th century, medieval Failsworth formed a township in the parish of Manchester and hundred of Salford.

After the Poor Law Amendment Act 1834, Failsworth joined the Manchester Poor Law Union, a social security unit. Its first local authority was a local board of health set up in 1863 and responsible for standards of hygiene and sanitation. The board constructed Failsworth Town Hall in 1880. After the Local Government Act 1894, the area became Failsworth Urban District within the administrative county of Lancashire. In 1933 came a small exchange of land with neighbouring Manchester; in 1954, parts of Limehurst Rural District were added to Failsworth Urban District. Under the Local Government Act 1972, Failsworth Urban District was abolished. Since 1 April 1974 it has formed an unparished area of the Metropolitan Borough of Oldham, a local government district within the metropolitan county of Greater Manchester. Failsworth contains two of the twenty wards of the Metropolitan Borough of Oldham; Failsworth East and Failsworth West. The Failsworth Independent Party is active in the area and holds two of the seats on Oldham Council.

Failsworth lies in Manchester Central (UK Parliament constituency), represented in the House of Commons by Lucy Powell MP of the Labour Party.

== Geography ==
At 53°30′37″N 2°9′27″W (53.5102°, −2.1575°) Failsworth lies 163 miles (262 km) north-north-west of London, as the southern tip of the Metropolitan Borough of Oldham, sharing borders with Manchester (north to south-west) and Tameside (south to east). It is traversed by the A62 road between Manchester and Oldham, by the former rail line of the Oldham Loop and by the Rochdale Canal, across its north-west corner. The M60 motorway passes through. For the Office for National Statistics, Failsworth counts as part of the Greater Manchester Urban Area.

The land in Failsworth slopes gently from east to west away from the Pennines and from brooks that bound it on the north-west (Moston Brook) and south-east (Lord's Brook). Failsworth has a country park, Daisy Nook, on undulating wooded land on its eastern border largely belonging to the National Trust. It is suited to walking, horse riding, fishing and other pursuits.

== Demography ==
=== Population change ===
Population growth in Failsworth since 1901
Year	1901	1911	1921	1931	1939	1951	1961	1981	1991	2001
Population	14,152	15,998	16,973	15,726	17,505	18,032	19,819	20,951	20,160	20,007
Source: A Vision of Britain through Time

== Economy ==
Failsworth grew as a mill town around the hat-making industry, which continues in the town. This began as a cottage industry before the firm of Failsworth Hats was set up in 1903 to manufacture silk hats. For a time the company had a factory near the former Failsworth Council offices and it remains in the area to this day. Other activities include electrical goods manufacture (such as Russell Hobbs) by Spectrum Brands, formerly Pifco Ltd), and plastic production and distribution by Hubron Ltd.

In July 2007, the Tesco supermarket chain opened a 24-hour Extra branch superstore on the banks of the wharf. The move was opposed by shop-owners, who claimed they would have lost customers and may have been forced to close. Tesco's arrival had been expected to be a catalyst bringing other stores, bars and restaurants to Failsworth. The only other large store is a branch of Morrisons housed in a building constructed on the demolished site of Marlborough No. 2 Mill.

== Landmarks ==
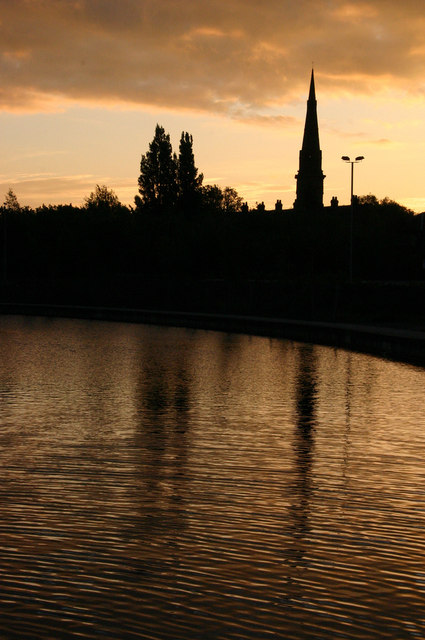
The Parish Church of St John was founded in 1845

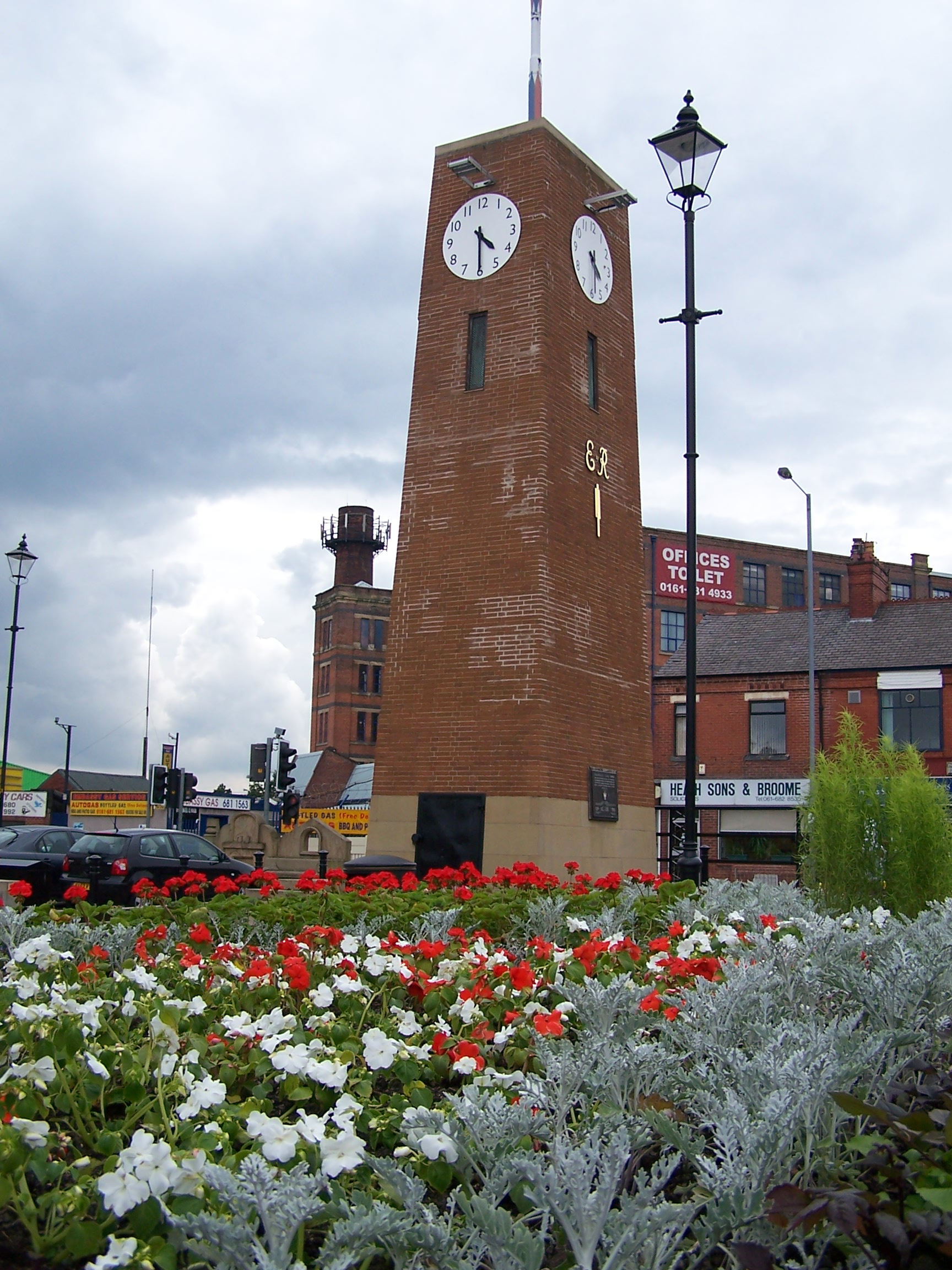
Failsworth Pole

A Failsworth Pole in Oldham Road was first raised in 1793 as a "political pole", although a local historian suggests there were others before and that maypoles probably stood there for centuries. It now stands on a site from which an earlier one blew down in 1950.

After a major restoration of the Pole, clock tower and gardens in 2006, a bronze statue of Benjamin Brierley was placed in the gardens.

At the road junction of the A62 with Ashton Road West stands a cenotaph built in 1923 for over 200 Failsworth men who were killed in the First World War. Attendances at the cenotaph on Remembrance Sunday remain high at about 2,000. The annual parade is led by 202 Field Squadron, RE (TA), which is based in Failsworth. In June 2007 the war memorial was rededicated after a £136,000 makeover and opened by Colonel Sir John B. Timmins.

== Education ==
The local comprehensive school is Co-op Academy Failsworth, which moved to a new building in 2008 from two buildings known as Upper School and Lower School. It caters for students aged between 11 and 16. The £28-million project brought the town's secondary schooling to come under one roof. It has specialist sports college status.

School	Type/Status	Headteacher	OfSTED	Location	Reference
Co-op Academy Failsworth	Secondary School	Phillip Quirk	105735	53.507620°N 2.146614°W	
Woodhouses VA Primary School	Primary School	Helen Woodward	105688	53.504482°N 2.134096°W	
South Failsworth Community Primary School	Primary School	Vicki Foy	105656	53.499164°N 2.158921°W	
Higher Failsworth Primary School	Primary School	Sam Forster	134784	53.514258°N 2.148734°W	
St John's CE Primary School	Primary School	Louise Bonter	146670	53.508982°N 2.150887°W	
St Mary's RC Primary School	Primary School	Mary Garvey	105727	53.504745°N 2.159996°W	
Mather Street Primary School	Primary School	Martine Buckley	105649	53.509585°N 2.168270°W	
Propps Hall Junior Infant and Nursery School	Primary School	Gillian Kay	105663		
Spring Brook Academy (Upper School)	Special School	Sarah Dunsdon	143472		
SMS Changing Lives School	Independent Special School	Hecabe DuFraisse	146646		

== Religious sites ==
Name	Denomination	Location	Reference
The Holy Family	Church of England	53.497918°N 2.157408°W	
St John's	Church of England	53.511781°N 2.154473°W	
Woodhouses Church	Church of England	53.504885°N 2.133061°W	
St Mary's	Roman Catholic	53.504623°N 2.157416°W	
Hope Methodist Church	Methodist	53.515147°N 2.151141°W	
Roman Road Independent Methodist Church	Independent Methodist	53.511163°N 2.149825°W	
New Life Church	Assemblies of God	53.511237°N 2.153803°W	
Dob Lane Unitarian Chapel	Unitarianist	53.504194°N 2.176965°W	
Macedonia	United Reformed Church	53.508652°N 2.143494°W	
Zion	Old Baptist Union	53.501869°N 2.163218°W	
Faithworks	Evangel	53.506373°N 2.166806°W	
Failsworth Salvation Army Community Church	The Salvation Army	53.513441°N 2.152605°W	

== Transport ==
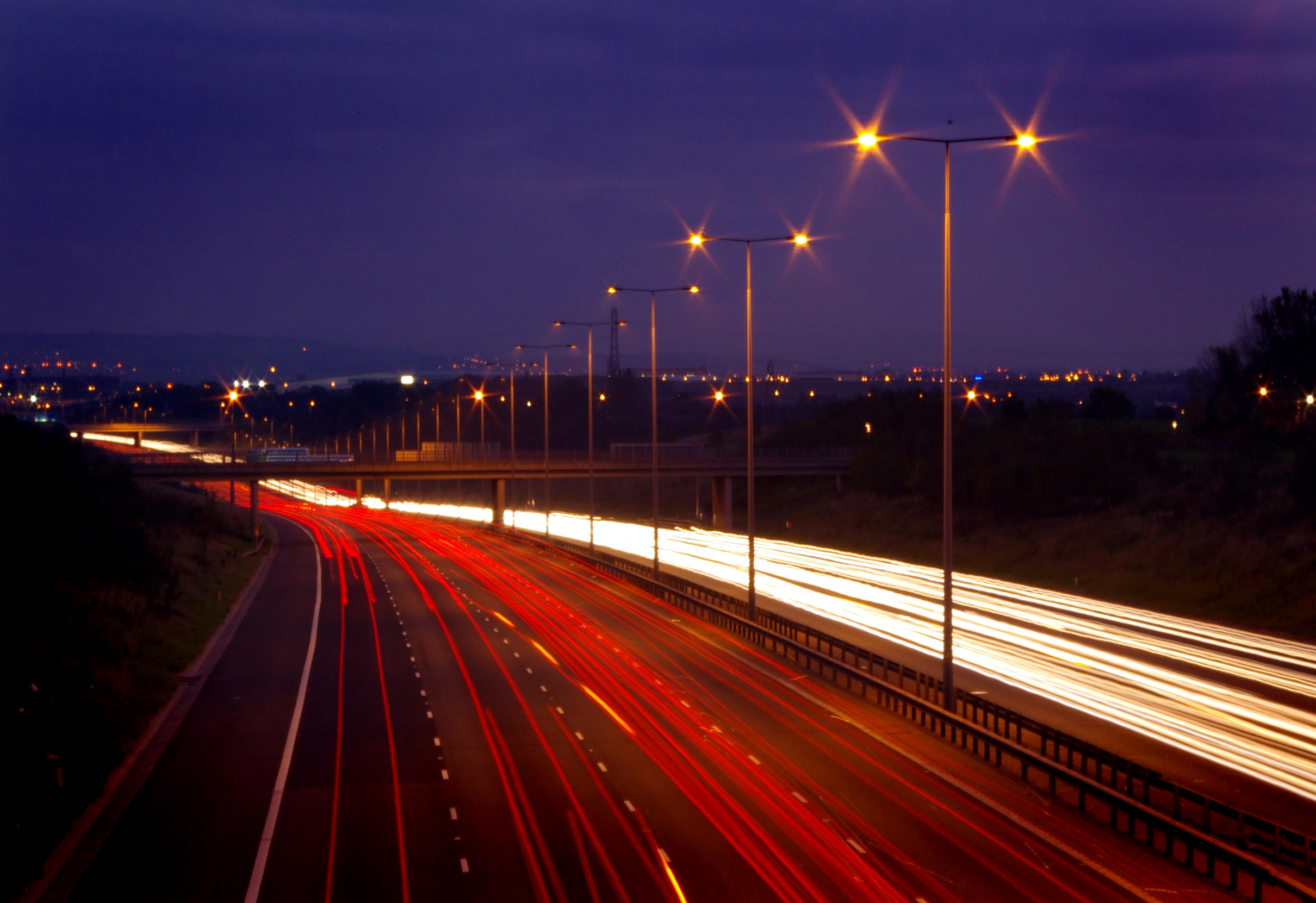
The M60 motorway from Cutler Hill, Failsworth

Failsworth's main thoroughfare is Oldham Road (A62) between Manchester and Oldham. The M60 is a ring-road motorway circling Greater Manchester, with access via Junction 22. Its completion around 1995–2000 saw the installation of a graded junction and other notable changes to the A62. It led to several rows of buildings around the junction being demolished.

There are frequent buses through Failsworth between Manchester city centre and Oldham on Stagecoach Manchester's 83 Bee Network service. There is also a frequent service to Manchester city centre and to Saddleworth via Oldham, with service 84. Other bus destinations from Failsworth are Ashton-under-Lyne, Chadderton, Huddersfield, Rochdale, Royton, Saddleworth, Shaw & Crompton and Trafford Centre.

Failsworth tram stop in Hardman Lane is on the Oldham & Rochdale line of the Manchester Metrolink. At peak times, trams run every 6 minutes south towards East Didsbury via central Manchester and north to Shaw & Crompton or Rochdale via Oldham. At off-peak times, trams run every 12 minutes to East Didsbury and Rochdale. Previously this was an unstaffed rail station on the Oldham Loop line serviced by Northern Rail services to Manchester Victoria or Rochdale via Oldham. It closed in October 2009 under Phase 3a of Metrolink extension and re-opened as a tram stop in 2012.

== Twin town ==
Failsworth Urban District was twinned with Landsberg am Lech in Bavaria, Germany from 1974 to 2008.

== Notable people ==
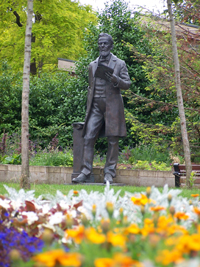
Benjamin Brierley statue at Failsworth

- Bonnie Prince Charlie (1720–1788), stayed overnight at the Bull's Head public house in 1745.
- Sir Elkanah Armitage (1794–1876), a 19th-century industrialist, Liberal Party politician and former Lord Mayor of Manchester.
- Benjamin Brierley (1825–1896), weaver, poet, essayist and writer in the Lancashire dialect. There is a bronze statue of him in the public gardens by The Pole.
- Roy Fuller (1912–1991), an English writer, known mostly as a poet.
- Harry Boardman (1930–1987), the Lancashire folk singer was born locally
- Sir James Ratcliffe (born 1952), chemical engineer and businessman, chairman and CEO of the INEOS chemicals group, born locally.
- Darren Wharton (born 1961), singer and songwriter; member of Thin Lizzy, now fronts Dare
- Gary Mounfield (1962-2025), a musician known as Mani, formerly with the band the Stone Roses during the Madchester period and later joined Primal Scream.
- Jim McMahon (born 1980), politician, MP has represented Oldham West, Chadderton and Royton since 2015, former leader of Oldham Council
- Agyness Deyn (born 1983), supermodel, real name Laura Michelle Hollins, brought up locally before her family moved to Ramsbottom.
- Amy James-Kelly (born 1995), actress played Maddie Heath in Coronation Street grew up locally.

=== Sport ===
- Mike Atherton (born 1968), broadcaster, journalist and former test cricketer, was brought up locally and played 115 Test cricket matches. Has a road, (Atherton Close), named after him, opposite the cricket club in Woodhouses where he played in his youth.
- Ronnie Wallwork (born 1977), footballer, played 178 games, mainly for West Bromwich Albion, lived in Woodhouses
- Anthony Farnell (born 1978), Boxer, former WBU Middleweight champion known as the Woodhouse Warrior. He has since become a fight trainer and owns a gym (Arnie's Gym) in nearby Newton Heath
- Katie Zelem (born 1996), footballer, has played over 180 games, including 115 for Manchester United W.F.C. and 12 for England
- Jamie Stott (born 1997), an English footballer who has played over 250 games

== See also ==
- Listed buildings in Failsworth
