= Woodbridge, Devon =

Village in Devon, England

Coordinates: 50.7510°N 3.1528°W

Woodbridge
- Location within Devon
- OS grid reference: SY1895
- Civil parish: Farway
- District: East Devon
- Shire county: Devon
- Region: South West
- Country: England
- Sovereign state: United Kingdom
- Police: Devon and Cornwall
- Fire: Devon and Somerset
- Ambulance: South Western

Woodbridge is a hamlet in the civil parish of Farway, in the East Devon district, in Devon, England, south-south-east of the town of Honiton. The OS grid reference is SY1895.
