= Woodbridge, Dorset =

Village in Dorset, England

Coordinates: 50.896°N 2.424°W

Woodbridge
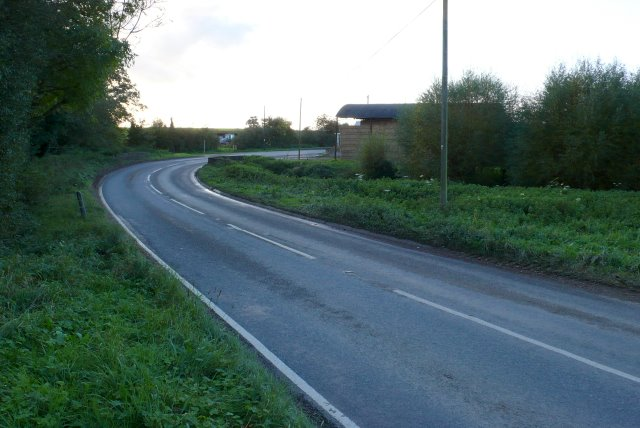
- The A3030 road near Woodbridge

- Location within Dorset
- OS grid reference: ST703107
- Civil parish: Fontmell Magna
- Unitary authority: Dorset
- Ceremonial county: Dorset
- Region: South West
- Country: England
- Sovereign state: United Kingdom
- Post town: SHERBORNE
- Postcode district: DT9
- Dialling code: 01963
- Police: Dorset
- Fire: Dorset and Wiltshire
- Ambulance: South Western
- UK Parliament: West Dorset

Woodbridge is a hamlet in the civil parish of Fontmell Magna, in Dorset, England. The village is on the A3030 road and to the north east of Holwell.

== History ==
Woodbridge was part of the North Dorset district until 2019.

== Politics ==
Woodbridge is part of the West Dorset parliamentary constituency.
