= B roads in Zone 2 of the Great Britain numbering scheme =

The numbering zones for roads in Great Britain

B roads are numbered routes in Great Britain of lesser importance than A roads. See the article Great Britain road numbering scheme for the rationale behind the numbers allocated.

== Zone 2 (3 digits) ==
Road	From	To	Notes
B200 (defunct)	A3 Borough High Street	A200 Tooley Street	Road Name: St Thomas Street, Druid Street; Druid Street is now mostly pedestrianized and St Thomas Street is part of the A200 one-way system.
B201 (defunct)	A3 Borough High Street	B202 (now A2198) Long Lane	Road Name: Tabard Street; now pedestrianized.
B202	A100 Tower Bridge Road	A200 Jamaica Road	Road Name: Abbey Street; originally began at the A2 and ran along Long Lane, but this has been upgraded to Class I status as the A2198.
B203	A2 Old Kent Road	A2206 Southwark Park Road	Road Name: Dunton Road
B204	A2208 Rotherhithe New Road	A2 Old Kent Road	Road Names: Catlin Street, Rolls Road
B205	A200 Jamaica Road	A200 Lower Road	Forms a loop around the Rotherhithe peninsula. Road Names: Brunel Road, Salter Road, Redriff Road
B206	A2 Lower Road/A2208 Rotherhithe New Road	A200 Evelyn Street	Road Names: Plough Way, Grove Street
B207	A200 Westwood Street	A2 New Cross Road, New Cross	Road Names: Pagnell Street, Edward Street, Stanford Street, Trundley's Road
B208	A206 Greenwich High Road, Greenwich	A200 Creek Road	Road Name: Norman Road
B209	A206 Greenwich High Road, Greenwich	A2 Shooters Hill Road	Road Names: Royal Hill, Hyde Vale
B210	A2, Blackheath, Greenwich Park	A206, Woolwich, Woolwich Arsenal railway station	Via Charlton, A205, Royal Artillery Barracks; road names: Charlton Way, Vanburgh Park, Charlton Road, The Village, Charlton Park Road, MacArthur Terrace, Little Heath, Hill Reach, Artillery Place, Wellington Street,
B211	Roundabout at B212/B210 in Blackheath	A207 Shooters Hill Road	Road Name: Old Dover Road. Originally began at the A206, but this section was declassified (and partially destroyed) in the 1960s when the parallel A102(M) (now A102) was built.
B212	A20/A2212 at Lee Green	Roundabout at B210/B211 in Blackheath	Via B220, Blackheath railway station; road names:Stratheden Road, Prince of Wales Road, Montpelier Row, Montpelier Vale, Tranquil Vale, Blackheath Village, Lee Road. Originally began at the A21 in Bromley; this section is now the A2212.
B213	A2016 Bronze Age Way	A2041 Harrow Manor Way	Road names: Lower Road, Picardy Street, Gilbert Road, Abbey Road
B214	A2 Old Kent Road	A215 Camberwell Road	Road name: Albany Road
B215	A2 Old Kent Road	A202 Peckham High Street,	Road names: Trafalgar Avenue, Willwbrook Road, Peckham Hill Street
B216	A2 Old Kent Road	B215 Peckham Hill Street	Road names: Peckham Park Road, Butler Close
B217	A202 Peckham Road	A215 Camberwell Road	Road name: Southampton Way, New Church Road
B218	A205 Stanstead Road in Forest Hill	A2 New Cross Road in New Cross	Road Names: Brockley Rise, Stondon Park, Brockley Road, Malpas Road, Florence Road
B219	A2214/A2215 in Peckham Rye	A2216 Lordship Lane in Camberwell	Road Names: Peckham Rye, Barry Road
B220	A20 Lee High Road in Lewisham	B212	Road Names: Belmont Hill, Lee Terrace
B221	A3 at Clapham North tube station	A23 Streatham High Road at Streatham Hill railway station	Originally ran from the A21 in Catford to the B212 (now A2212) in Lee; much of route is now the A205.
B222	A2214 Half Moon Lane	A2217 Coldharbour Lane	Road Names: Milkwood Road, Hinton Road
B223	A23 Brixton Road	A2214 Dulwich Road	Road Names: Railton Road, Atlantic Road
B224	A3 and A24	A3216 Queenstown Road	Road Names: Consists of 3 entrances: Clapham Common North Side, Rookery Road, The Pavement and 2 exits Broughton Street, Silverthorne Road
B225 (defunct)	A213 near Brockwell Park	A212 near Crystal Palace Park	Renumbered to A2199 sometime after the 1960s.
B226	A2212 near Grove Park railway station	A208 in Mottingham	Via Chinbrook. Road names: Grove Park Road, Chinbrook Road Originally ran from the A212 in Catford to the A2216 near Forest Hill; this was renumbered as a portion of the A205 in the 1930s.
B227	A205 Waldram Crescent east of Forest Hill railway station	A212 in Bell Green	Road names: Perry Vale, Perry Rise. Originally began at the A2216 west of Forest Hill railway station; this section is now gone.
B228	A21 Kentish Way in Bromley	B251 Hayes Lane in Bromley	Road names: Masons Hill, Westmoreland Road Originally ran from Clapham to Dulwich; became part of the A205 in the 1930s.
B229	A217 in Summerstown	A3 at Battersea Rise	Road names: Burntwood Lane, Bellevue Road, Nightingale Lane, Bolingbroke Grove, Broomwood Road, Northcote Road
B230	A214 in Eden Park	A2015 in Beckenham	Road names: S Eden Park Road, Wickham Road, Bromley Road. Originally began at the A21 in Southend; this section is now part of the A2015.
B231 (defunct)	A214 Effra Road in Brixton	A2214 Brixton Water Lane in Brixton	Road names: Morval Road; now part of the A2214 one-way system.
B231 (defunct)	A214 near Crystal Palace Park	A236 in Croydon	Essentially a continuation of the A212; renumbered as a portion of the A212 in 1935.
B232	A214 in Wandsworth	A215 on Lambeth	Road names: Elder Road, Norwood High Street
B233 (defunct)	A22 (now A23)/A216 in Streatham	A3 near Wandsworth	Upgraded to Class I status as the A214 in the 1930s.
B234	A217 in Earlsfield	A3 at Battersea Rise	Road names: Earlsfield Road, Spencer Park
B235	Raynes Park	Summerstown	Road names: Worple Road, Alexandra Road, Gap Road, Plough Lane, Summerstown
B236	B218	A21	Road names: Adelaide Avenue, Ladywell Road
B237	A24	A214	Road names: Nightingale Lane, St James's Drive
B238	B218	B219	Road names: Honor Oak Park, Forest Hill Road, Peckham Rye
B239 (defunct)	A2217/A215 in Camberwell	A202 in Camberwell	Road Name: Daneville Road; now partly pedestrianized.
B240	A3 Borough High Street	A201 New Kent Road	Road name: Harper Road
B241	A214 near Tooting Bec Common	A217 near Amen Corner, Tooting	Road names: Church Lane, Rectory Road
B242	A214 in Streatham	A24 in Balham	
B243	B274/B275 in South Croydon	A215 in Woodside Green	Road names: Woodside Green, Morland Road, South Park Hill Road, Croham Road. Exists in two sections, connected by the A232 and A222.
B244 (defunct)	A21 at John's Cross	A269 at Battle	Formerly a portion of the A21 before it was rerouted over the B2091. Returned to Class I status as the A2100.
B245	A227 at Tonbridge	A21/A225 Junction at Sevenoaks Weald	Formerly the A21 until the Tonbridge Bypass was constructed. Road names: London Road, Tonbridge Road, London Road
~~B246~~ - ~~B249~~	unused		
B250	A206 in Belvedere	B213 in Belvedere	Road name: Picardy Road
B251	B265 in Bromley	B230 in Bromley	Road names: Pickhurst Lane, Hayes Lane Originally ran from the A206 to the A220 in Erith. Now part of the A206.
B252 (defunct)	A220 Bexley Road in Erith	A206 in Erith	Upgraded to Class I status as a portion of the A206 in the 1930s. The B252 was reused on the former routing of the A206, but this has since been declassified.
B253	A2016 near Belvedere	B213 near Asda	Road names: Picardy Manorway. Former portion of the A2016. Originally ran from the A2000 to the A2 in Crayford; declassified sometime after the 1960s.
B254 (defunct)	A2 in Dartford	River Darent	Road Name: Hythe Street. The southern half became a portion of the A206 between 1923 and 1927 and the remainder was declassified in the late 1960s.
B255	A226 in Greenhithe	B260 in Longfield	At the centre it meets the A2 Road names: Highcross Road, Southfleet Road, High Street, Bean Lane, High Street, Bean Lane, St Clement's Way, Station Road, High Street, The Ave
B256	A226 at New Road	A226 at Bath Street	Road names: West Street, Stuart Road
B257 (defunct)	A226 King Street in Gravesend	B256 in Gravesend	Road Name: High Street; declassified (probably by the 1950s) and is now pedestrianized.
B258	A225 Hawley Road, Dartford	A224 Cray Avenue, Orpington	Road names: Church Hill, High Road, Barn End Lane, Top Dartford Road, Main Road, Swanley Lane, High Street, Goldsel Road, Green Court Road, Broadway, Main Road, Cray Road, Crockenhill Road, Blacksmiths Lane, High Street, Mill Brook Road, Station Road
B259	A226 in Swanscombe	A2260 in Belsham	Road names: High Street, Stanhope Road, Southfleet Road, Watling Street Originally ran from Newhaven to Eastbourne and planned as B2108, this route was given the out-of-zone number of B259 to demonstrate that it was part of the same route as the A259, which the B259 was upgraded (one of the first roads to be upgraded to Class I status) to in 1924.
B260	A227 at Meopham Station	A226 at Dartford	Road names: Longfield Road, Main Road, Green Street Green Road, Trolling Down Hill, Green Street Green Road
B261	A226 at Green Street Green Road	A226 at Rochester Road	Road names: Dover Road, Dover Road East, Old Road West, Old Road East, Echo Square, Old Road East
B262	A2260 at Dartford	B260 at Green Street Green Road	Road names: Park Corner Road, Foxhounds Lane; Sandbanks Hill, Betsham Road, Station Road ⊃- Station Road
B263	A211, Eltham	A222, Chislehurst	Via New Eltham, A20, A208; road names: Green Lane, Heathfield Lane, Loop Road, Prince Imperial Road
B264	A222, Bickley	A208, Chislehurst	Road names: Chislehurst Road, Old Hill, Watts Lane, Manor Park Road
B265	A222, Bickley	A233 at Westerham Road	Road names: Page Heath Lane, Homesdale Road, Hayes Lane, Hayes Street, Baston Road, Heathfield Road
B266	A23, Thornton Heath Pond	A215, South Norwood Hill	Road names: Brigstock Road, High Street, Whitehorse Lane (past Selhurst Park football ground) Originally ran from Crystal Place Park to Penge; this was upgraded to Class I status as an extension of the A234 in the early 1930s.
B267 (defunct)	A213 Windmill Road in Croydon	A222 Cherry Orchard Road in Croydon	Road Name: St James Road, Lower Addiscombe Road; became a spur of the A222 by the 1950s.
B268 (defunct)	A232 at Coney Hall	B269 in Sanderstead	Now part of the A2022.
B269	Sanderstead Road, South Croydon	Pootings Road, Four Elms	Road names: Pootings Road, Spout Lane, Main Road, Kent Hatch Road, High Street, Titsey Road, Titsey Hill, Croydon Road, Limpsfield Road, The Green, Limpsfield Road, Sanderstead Hill, Sanderstead Road; originally ran further to Syliards; this is now part of the B2027.
B270	A22 at Godstone Road	B269 at Limpsfield Road	Road names: Hillbury Road, Westhall Road
B271	A232	A23	Road names:Beynon Road, Carshalton Park Road, Ruskin Road, Park Lane, Boundary Road, Stanley Park Road, Stafford Road
B272	A23 at Streatham High Road	A2022 at Foxley Lane	Road names: Greyhound Lane, Streatham Vale, Greyhound Terrace, Rowan Road, Manor Road, Windmill Road, Beddington Lane, Hillier's Lane, Plough Lane (at Beddington), Sandy Lane South, Foresters Drive, Plough Lane(at Purley/Russel Hill)
B273	A23, Streatham/Norbury	B266, Thornton Heath Clock Tower	Road names: Green Lane, Parchmore Road Originally ran east of Mitcham from the A217 to the A237. Became part of the A239, probably by 1932.
B274	A212, A235	At the end it meets B275 and B243	Road name: St Peter’s Road
B275	Fiveways (A23, A232, B271 and B275)	A2022	Road names: Upper Selsdon Road, Selsdon Road, South End Road, Bartlett Street
B276	A23, Coulsdon	B2030	Road name: Marlpit Lane
B277	A237 at Hackbridge	A232 at Carshalton Ponds	
B278	B2032 at Woodmansterne	A24/A239	Rose Hill
B279	Raynes Park	B2230 at Angel Hill, Sutton	Road names: Grand Drive, Tudor Drive, Sutton Common Road
B280	A24, Epsom	A244, Oxshott	
B281	A238, Raynes Park	A219, Wimbledon Common	
B282	A238, Raynes Park	A2043, New Malden	Road names: West Barnes Lane, Burlington Road
B283	A217, Belmont Rise, Belmont, Sutton	A238, Coombe	Road name The Crescent, Burdon Lane, Sandy Lane, Station Way, High Street New Malden, Coombe Road, Traps Lane
B284	A2043, Old Malden	A240, Burgh Heath	Road Names: Church Road, Old Malden Lane, Worcester Park Road, Ruxley Lane, Chessington Road, Hook Road, Church Street, Burgh Heath Road, Yew Tree Bottom Road.
B285	A219, Wimbledon	A24, Morden	Road names: Hartfield Road, Dorset Road
B286	A298, Raynes Park	A297, Morden	Road names: Martin Way, Crown Lane, Aberconway Road Originally ran along Kingsdowne Road in Surbiton, cutting the corner between the A243 and A240. Renumbered to the B3364 when the B286 was put out of-zone when the A3 was rerouted to the Kingston Bypass instead of the A239, although this section of the B3364 is now the A3210.
B287 (defunct)	A243 in Surbiton	A240 in Surbiton	Road Name: Ditton Road. Put out-of-zone when the A3 was allocated to the Kingston Bypass instead of the A239. Because of this, the B287 was renumbered to the B3364.
B288	A2022	B284	Longdown Lane South, a short link road in Epsom Downs.
B289	B284, Epsom	B290	Road name Downs Road, a link road between Epsom and Epsom Downs
B290	A24, Epsom	A217, Kingswood	
B291	A240	B284	Short link road on the eastern side of Epsom
B292 (defunct)	A220 in Bexleyheath	A223 at Black Prince	Upgraded to a portion of the A220 in the late 1960s.
~~B293~~ - ~~B299~~	unused		

== Zone 2 (4 digits) ==
Road	From	To	Notes
B2000	A228 in Strood	A289 in Cliffe	Runs across the Hoo Peninsula through Cliffe Woods
B2001	Continuation of the A228 east from London Thamesport	Grain	Runs across the Isle of Grain. Original route between Hoo and Grain Crossing now part of the A228.
B2002	A2 at Strood	A228 at Frindsbury	Serves Strood railway station
B2003	A231 in Chatham	A2 in Chatham	Was part of the A2 one-way system, but is now two-way to carry the A231. Medway Council's documents indicate that The Brook and Chatham High Street between Union Street and the Luton Arches is in fact the B2003.
B2004	Rainham, Kent	Lower Rainham	
B2005	A249 Kemsley	B2006 Sittingbourne	
B2006	A249 at Bobbing	A2 at Sittingbourne	
B2007	A249	Sheerness	
B2008	A250 Halfway Houses	A2500 west of Eastchurch	via Minster
B2009 (defunct)	A2 in Thong	A227 in Meopham	Originally began at Strood, but the section from Strood to Thong became part of the A2 in 1924. The remainder was declassified in the late 1980s.
B2009 (defunct)			Listed in the c. 2002 DfT Card Index as "Brompton Nr. Gillingham", likely short-lived as the original B2009 existed until the 1980s. Exact location unknown.
B2010	B2162 Yalding	A229 Hayle Road, Maidstone	via West and East Farleigh, Tovil Originally ran along New Road from Rochester to Chatham. An important route from the beginning as it avoided the centre of Chatham, it was upgraded to Class I status in the 1920s and is now the A2 mainline.
B2011	A260 in Folkestone	A256 in Dover	Former portion of the A20. Originally used as the Maidstone northern bypass, connecting the A20 to itself. Upgraded to an A road with the same number around 1958, but was declassified in 1961 when the A20(M) (now M20) opened. One small section survives as a rerouted A249.
B2012	A229 at the White Rabbit roundabout, Maidstone	A249 in Maidstone	Unsigned.
B2013 (defunct)	A229 Loose Road in Maidstone	A20 High Street in Maidstone	Now part of the A229 one-way system; the northern end is unclassified.
B2014	St-Lawrence in Ramsgate	A254 near Westwood Cross	Bypasses the Newington estate in Ramsgate Originally used from the A228 in West Malling to the A20 west of Larkfield. Declassified when West Malling was bypassed, as its western end had no classified road to end on.
B2015	A228 Borough's Oak Farm, East Peckham	A26 Wateringbury	
B2016	A20 Wrotham Heath	A26/A228 near Mereworth	
B2017	A26 east of Tonbridge	B2160 south of Paddock Wood	via Five Oak Green
B2018 (defunct)	A25 in Borough Green	A25 in Wrotham	Section along Western Road now the A227 and the remainder unclassified.
B2019	A225 High Street, Sevenoaks	A25 Wildernesse NE of Sevenoaks	Seal Hollow Road
B2020	A224 near Sevenoaks railway station	A225 in Sevenoaks	St Botolph's Road
B2021	B2260 in Tonbridge	A227 in Tonbridge	East Street; swapped with the A26 (now A227) in the 1950s.
B2022 (defunct)	A264 in Tunbridge Wells	A263 in Tunbridge Wells	Ran along Church Road and Crescent Road, forming a southern bypass of part of the town centre. Due to its usefulness, the route became part of the A264 mainline.
B2023	A26 London Road, Tunbridge Wells	A264 Pembury Road, Tunbridge Wells	High Street, Grove Hill Road, Camden Hill, Prospect Road
B2024	A25 in Westerham	B269 near Warlingham	Croydon Road, Clarks Lane
B2025	A25 in Limpsfield	High Street in Limpsfield	Detillens Lane
B2026	Westerham	A22 near Maresfield	Road Names: Hosey Hill, Hosey Common Road, Main Road, Station Road, Mont St Aignan Way, High Street (Edenbridge), Mill Hill, Hartfield Road, Edenbridge Road, (B2110) High Street (Hartfield), Jib Jacks Hill, Chuck Hatch Road, High Road, Lampool Hill, Straight Half Mile
B2027	B2026 Edenbridge	B245 Hildenborough	via Four Elms, Chiddingstone Causeway, Penshurst station, and Leigh
B2028	B2026 near Edenbridge	B2272 in Haywards Heath	Road Names: Marsh Green Road, Moor Lane, Racecourse Road, Town Hill, High Street (Lingfield), Newchapel Road, West Park Road, Turners Hill Road, North Street, Selsfield Road, Ardingly Road, Selsfield Road, High Street (Ardingly), Lindfield Road, Ardingly Road, High Street (Lindfield), Black Hill, West Common, Sydney Road, Perrymount Road, The Broadway
B2029	A22 south of Blindley Heath near Godstone	B2028 Lingfield	
B2030	B2208 near Caterham railway station	A237 on the border of Coulsdon and Purley	Road Names: Church Hill, Church Road, High Street (Caterham-on-the-Hill), Town End, Banstead Road, Coulsdon Road, Stoats Nest Road, Smitham Downs Road
B2031	A23 north of Merstham	B2030 in Caterham	Road Names: Shepherd's Hill, Alderstead Lane, Dean Lane, Rook Lane, Chaldon Road
B2032	A25 Crossways Farm, Betchworth	A237 Coulsdon	
B2033	B2450 Fetcham Grove	B2032	
B2034	A25 Redhill	A217 Reigate	Blackborough Road; West Road
B2035 (defunct)	A217 in Woodhatch	A23 near Salfords	Upgraded to the A2044 in the 1970s.
B2036	A23 in Horley	A273 in the south of Burgess Hill	
B2037	B2036	A264 Copthorne	
B2038	A24 north of Dorking	A25 Pixham	Pixham Lane
B2039	A3 north-east of Ripley	A246 south of East Horsley	passes Horsley station
B2040	A2 Ospringe	A2 Canterbury Road, Faversham	forms a loop around Faversham
B2041	A2 London Road, Faversham	B2040 East Street, Faversham	goes past Faversham railway station
B2042	A25 near Riverhead	B2027 Four Elms	Originally used from Whitstable to Canterbury. Renumbered A290 in the early 1920s. After the completion of the A299 Whitstable bypass, the section inside the bypass kept the A290 number, but was downgraded to a portion of the B2205 in the 2000s.
B2043 (defunct)	A2 (now A290) in Canterbury	A28 in Canterbury	Declassified.
B2044 (defunct)	B2040 at Herne Bay	A28 in Sturry	Renumbered A291 in the early 1920s; the northernmost section is now part of the B2205 following the completion of the A299 Herne Bay bypass.
B2044 (defunct)	A258 in Walmer	B2057 in Walmer	Declassified.
B2045	A2 near Syndale Park Motel	Oare	Western Link Originally used from Herne Bay to Upstreet. Upgraded to Class I status as the A299 in the late 1920s. But in the 1930s, Thanet Way east of Herne Bay was completed and the A299 was rerouted on it. All of the route was declassified except the section between Herne Bay and the new A299, which became the eastern end of the B2205. The B2205 was later rerouted along Canterbury Road (formerly the A291 and B2044 before that) and this declassified the remaining section.
B2046	A2 and A260 near Barham in Kent	A257 at Wingham	Passes the outer edges of the Villages of Aylesham and Adisham
B2047 (defunct)	Monkton	Minster	Paralleled the A253 for much of its length; declassified in the early 1990s.
B2048 (defunct)	Birchington	Stonelees	Downgraded in sections from the early 1990s: first the section south of the A299 and then the section to the north after 2000. The section through Ebbsfleet was split by the new A256 in the 2010s. A short section north of the A299 is now part of the B2190 and the northernmost section is part of the B2050 (although some maps claim it is still B2048).
B2049 (defunct)	B2048 near Acol	A254 near Margate	Declassified in the early 1990s; the easternmost section is now part of the B2052.
B2050	A256 at Ramsgate, Kent	Birchington-on-Sea	via Manston, Kent, Isle of Thanet
B2051	A28 Clock Tower, Margate	B2052 Northdown, Margate	closely follows Margate sea-front before it turns to the south Originally ran along Minster Road on the Isle of Thanet from the A28 to the then-B2049. Declassified in the late 1980s, probably along with the B2049.
B2052	A28 Westbrook, Margate	A255 Broadstairs	via North Foreland
B2053	B2052 Northdown, Margate	A255 near Broadstairs station	southern section closely follows railway Originally used from Broadstairs to Westwood. When the A255 was moved to the new Broadstairs Road, the B2053 was extended along High Street. Renumbered to a section of the A256 in the 1990s; the eastern extension was declassified.
B2054	A255 Chilton, Ramsgate	Boundary Road, Ramsgate	includes most of Ramsgate sea-front
B2055	A255 St John's Church, Margate	B2051 Fort Crescent, Cliftonville	Bypasses Cliftonville's High Street Originally used along Strand Street in Sandwich. Declassified due to completion of the Sandwich bypass, although it was decommissioned some time earlier.
B2056	A258 Upper Deal	A258 Lower Walmer	
B2057 (defunct)	A258 near Lower Walmer	A258 in Ringwould	Downgraded in the early 1990s and is now unclassified.
B2058 (defunct)	St Margaret's Bay	Martin Mill	Downgraded in the early 1990s (probably with other small Kent B-roads).
B2059 (defunct)	A2 in Dover	A2 in Dover	Originally ended at the A258, but was later rerouted along Frith Street and Maison Dieu Road to the A2. Now a branch of the A256.
B2060 (defunct)	A260 in Hawkinge	A256 at Lydden Hill	Originally ended at the A2 at Kearsney; when the Lydden/Dover bypass was built, the B2060 was extended along the former A2 to the A256. Entire route now unclassified.
B2061 (defunct)	A260 (now A259) in Folkestone	A259 (now A260) in Folkestone	Declassified.
B2062 (defunct)	A20 in Folkestone	A260 in Folkestone	Upgraded to Class I status in the 1950s and is now part of the A259.
B2063	A259 Seabrook	B2170 near Shorncliffe Camp	
B2064	M20 junction at Cheriton	Folkestone	Former A20 (Cheriton High Street) and Shorncliffe Road
B2065 (defunct)	A2 in Bishopsbourne	A259 in Hythe	Route declassified, despite its length and apparent importance.
B2066	B2194 Boundary Road, Hove	A259 Roedean, Brighton	New Church Road to Roedean Road (part of the route not open to cars at certain times) Originally ran along Prospect Road in Hythe as a loop off of the A259. Because of its importance as a town-centre relief road, it was upgraded to Class I status by the 1950s and is now part of the A259 mainline.
B2067	A20 near Lympne	Tenterden	Passes through Woodchurch, Hamstreet and close to Aldington
B2068	Canterbury	Newingreen	Used to end in Lympne but begins at M20 junction 11 and follows the course of the Roman Road, Stone Street.
B2069 (defunct)	A20	B2067	Now unclassified; number appeared in 1922 draft road number allocations as "Strood-Cobham" (now the A2); this was probably a typo for the B2009.
B2070	A3 near Liphook	A3 south of Petersfield	This was the original route of the A3 until it was bypassed by a new section Originally used from Ashford to New Romney. Much of the route (along with a section of the B2081) was upgraded to the A2070 in the 1980s while the remaining section through Ivychurch was declassified.
B2071	New Romney	Littlestone	
B2072 (defunct)	Chart Road in Ashford	Canterbury Road in Ashford	Reclassified as the A292 in 1924. Later became a spur of the A28, but is now unclassified.
B2072 (defunct)	A22 in Eastbourne	A259 in Eastbourne	Eastern section reclassified as the A2021 in the 1930s and the remainder upgraded to A-road status as the A2040 sometime after 1950.
B2073 (defunct)	B2074 in Ashford	A20 (now A292) in Ashford	Downgraded in 1973 due to completion of the A292.
B2074 (defunct)	A28 at Great Chart	Ashford town center	Originally continued on to the B2070, but this portion was upgraded to a portion of the A292 in 1973. In 2007, after the ring road was rebuilt for two-way traffic, the railway bridge on Godinton Road was closed to all traffic except buses, cancelling the B2074.
B2075	New Romney	Lydd	
B2076 (defunct)	A259 near Old Romney	B2075 in Lydd	Declassified.
B2077 (defunct)	A251 near Leaveland	A274 in Standen	Originally reappeared in the center of Charing at the A252/A20 junction, but was rerouted over the old A252 after it was rerouted around the village. Entire route declassified in 1991 after the M20 opened.
B2078 (defunct)	A229 in Shepway	A262 in Biddenden	Upgraded to Class I status as the A274 in the 1950s.
B2079	A21 near Flimwell	A229 south of Linton, Kent	
B2080	Tenterden	Brenzett	Via Appledore
B2081 (defunct)	B2080 in Brenzett	B2070 near Snave	Upgraded to the A2070 in the 1980s, but was later bypassed and is now unclassified.
B2082	Tenterden	Rye	Via Wittersham
B2083 (defunct)	A229 in Cranbrook Common	A262 in Sissinghurst	Downgraded in the 2000s; now unclassified.
B2084	Goudhurst	Goudhurst	Unsigned road which runs from the A262 east to the B2079 north
B2085	A262 Iden Green	A229 Hartley	
B2086	A28 Rolvenden	A229 Hartley	
B2087	A21 Flimwell	B2099 Ticehurst	
B2088	A28 Northiam	A268 Four Oaks, Beckley	Via Beckley
B2089	A21 Vinehall Street	Rye	
B2091 (defunct)	A21 in John's Cross	A229 (now B2244) south of Sedlescombe	Became a portion of a rerouted A21.
B2092	A259 Bulverhythe, St. Leonards	A2690 Mayfield Farm, St. Leonards	road names, Harley Shute Road and Crowhurst Road Originally used from Woodmans Green to Battle. Declassified by the 1990s.
B2093	A2100 Ridge West/ Harrow Lane, Hastings	A259 Ore, Hastings	road name The Ridge
B2094 (defunct)	A21 in St Leonards	St Leonards seafront	Upgraded to A road status as the A2102 in the 1980s.
B2095	A259 The Lamb Inn near Hooe	A2100 near Battle station	Exists in two sections, connected by a multiplex with the B2204.
B2096	A271 near Squirrel Inn, Battle	A265 Heathfield	via Netherfield, Woods Corner, Three Cups and Punnetts Town
B2097	A2 Troy Town, Rochester	A229 west of Walderslade	southern section runs between M2 and Rochester Airport Originally used along Boreham Street to Steven's Crouch. Upgraded to the A2027 in 1933, then downgraded to the B2204 by the 1980s, then upgraded again in the 1990s, but this time to the A271.
B2098	A259 Little Common Road, Bexhill-on-Sea	A269 Town Hall Square, Bexhill-on-Sea	via Sutherland Avenue, Collington Avenue and Terminus Road
B2099	A267 South of Frant	A21 North of Hurst Green	passes through Wadhurst and Ticehurst Originally ran along London Road in Bexhill. Renumbered as a portion of a rerouted A269 in the 1960s.
B2100	A26 Crowborough	B2162 Lamberhurst	via Rotherfield, Mark Cross, Wadhurst and Cousley Wood
B2101	B2100 Rotherfield	A267 about 1 1/2 miles north-west of Mayfield	
B2102	A22 Copwood roundabout, near Uckfield	A267 Cross in Hand	via Uckfield, Framfield and Blackboys (splits into two at eastern end)
B2103	A259 East Dean Road, west of Eastbourne	B2106 Devonshire Place, Eastbourne	via Eastbourne sea-front SW Originally used from the-then A22 London Road in Hailsham town centre to the A271 northeast of town. Upgraded to the A295 by 1932.
B2104	A267 near Hellingly	A259 Langney roundabout, Eastbourne	via Horsebridge, Hailsham and Stone Cross
B2105 (defunct)	A22 in Polegate	A259 in Wesham	Upgraded to the A274 in 1935 and became part of the A27 in the early 1950s. When this portion of A27 was bypassed, the route became part of the B2247 west of the B2204 and the eastern section (which was bypassed earlier) was declassified.
B2106	A259 Memorial roundabout, Eastbourne	A259, Seaside, Eastbourne	Devonshire Place, Eastbourne sea-front NE and Beach Road
B2107	B2106 in Eastbourne	A259 in Eastbourne	
B2108	A2 Rede Common, Strood	A289 Four Elms roundabout, Wainscott	Originally used from Lower Dicker to Seaford. Declassified after the 1970s.
B2109	A26 Newhaven	A259 Newhaven	Avis Road
B2110	A281 south of Lower Beeding	A264 Langton Green	Follows the route of the A22 for 2.6 miles between East Grinstead and Forest Row
B2111	A272 north-west of Scaynes Hill	B2028 Lindfield	
B2112	B2028 in Haywards Heath	A273 in Clayton	
B2113	B2036 in Burgess Hill	B2112 near Ditchling Common	
B2114	A23 north of Handcross	B2036 in Cuckfield	
B2115	A264 west of Lower Beeding	B2114 west of Cuckfield	
B2116	B2135 in Partridge Green	A275 south of Cooksbridge	Follows the route of the A281 for 1.4 miles between Shermanbury and north of Henfield
B2117	A281 east of Woodmancote	B2116 in Hurstpierpoint	
B2118	A23 north of Sayers Common	B2117 in Muddleswood	Current route is a former portion of the A23. Originally ran along the seafront in Brighton; this became an extension of the B2066 in 2005 due to widening and rerouting of the A23 north of Brighton and Hove.
B2119	A2010 in Brighton	A23 in Brighton	
B2120	Hove station	Seven Dials, Brighton	Cromwell Road and Davigdor Road
B2121	Seven Dials, Brighton	Clock Tower, Brighton	Dyke Road
B2122	A259 Kings Road, Brighton	A270 Old Shoreham Road/New England Road Brighton	Montpelier Road and continuations
B2122	A246 in Fetcham	A24/A243 Leatherhead by-pass	Former A2012. Duplicate number.
B2123	A27 at Falmer, close to University of Sussex	A259 at Rottingdean	via Woodingdean Originally ran along The Drive in Hove. Upgraded to Class I status as the A2023 before World War II, but returned to Class II as the B2185 in the 1960s when the A2023 was rerouted over the B2124.
B2124	B2192 The Broyle, Ringmer	A22 Golden Cross	via Laughton Originally used along Sackville Road in Hove. Upgraded to Class I status as the southern end of the A2023 in the 1960s (the A2023 originally followed the former B2123).
B2125 (defunct)	A277 in Portslade by Sea	A27 in Portslade	Ran along Station/Boundary Road, Victoria Road and Trafalgar Road. Due to its importance, it was upgraded to the A293 in 1924. In the 1960s, the A293 was rerouted along Trafalgar Road, leaving Victoria Road and Station/Boundary Road as the B2194. Trafalgar Road itself was later downgraded and is now the B2193.
B2125 (defunct)	A259 in South Lancing	A27 in North Lancing	Upgraded to Class I status as the A2025 around 1933.
B2125 (defunct)	A23 in Northgate, Crawley	A2004 in Southgate, Crawley	Former routing of the A23; renumbered as the A2219.
B2126	A25 Abinger Hammer	A24 west of Capel	via Forest Green and Ockley
B2127	B2128 Cranleigh	B2126 Forest Green	via Ewhurst
B2128	A281 Rudgwick	Chilworth	via Cranleigh
B2129	B2128 in Wonersh	A281 in Bramley	Although an old fingerpost sign shows the road as B2129, it is likely now a spur of the B2128.
B2130	A3100 Godalming	B2128 west of Cranleigh	
B2131	Bramshott, Hampshire	A283, between Northchapel, West Sussex and Chiddingfold, Surrey	via Haslemere, Surrey
B2132	A29, east of Slindon	B2259 Felpham	via Yapton Originally ran from Kingsfold to Northlands. Due to its importance, it was upgraded to Class I, becoming the A2022 in 1934, but it became a spur of the A29 in 1935. Now unclassified.
B2133	Alfold	Ashington	
B2134	A281/A264 in Horsham	A24 in Horsham	Decommissioned when the A24 was rerouted around Horsham; some of the route is now a spur of the B2237 (old A24) and the remainder is now unclassified and partially pedestrianized.
B2135	A24 near West Grinstead	Steyning	
B2136 (defunct)	B2135 in Partridge Green	A281 in Shermanbury	Absorbed into an extended B2116 in 1935, though it is unclear why this was done, as it causes the B2116 to have a long multiplex with the A281 and was only reclassified as another B-road.
B2136 (defunct)	A259 Terminus Road in Eastbourne	A259 Seaside Road in Eastbourne	Declassified sometime after the 2000s.
B2137	A259 in Brighton	B2118 in Brighton	Former portion of the A259. Original route ran from the A281 in Henfield to the A283 in Upper Beeding; this was upgraded to A-road status as the A2037 in 1935.
B2138	A283 Fittleworth	A29 south-west of Watersfield	
B2139	A29/A284 junction west of Houghton	Coolham	
B2140	B2187 Littlehampton	A259/A280 junction	
B2141	B2146 South Harting	A286 north of Lavant	Originally used from Salvington to Worthing, forming a westward loop off the A24. Upgraded to Class I status as the A2031 in 1935.
B2142	A2214 Lausanne Road, Nunhead	B218 Brockley Cross, Brockley	Gellatly Road, Drakefell Road, Endwell Road Originally ran from the Broadwater area of Worthing to the B2143 (now A259) near Goring station. Upgraded to Class I status as the A2032 in 1935.
B2143 (defunct)	Worthing	Chichester	The Bognor-Chichester section was upgraded to the A294 in 1924 with the remainder upgraded to the A259 by 1930. The entire route was renumbered A259 in 1935.
B2143 (defunct)	Brooklands Park	Mount Noddy	Became the B2110 and A264 in 1978 after the Beeching Way Gyratory opened.
B2144	A259 Chichester	A259 Merston, east of Chichester	Oving Road, Shopwyke Road, Drayton Lane
B2145	A27 at Chichester	Ends at the coast in Selsey	
B2146	A259 at Bosham	A272 near Petersfield	
B2147	B2148 at Emsworth	B2146 near Funtington	
B2148	A259 at Emsworth	B2149 near Rowland's Castle	
B2149	A27 in Havant	A3 in Horndean	
B2150	A3 near Bedhampton	A32	
B2151	Clarence Parade, Southsea	Bradford Junction, Fratton	Originally began at the A289 in Eastney (this is now part of the B2154) and originally continued north along Fratton Road to the-then A3 (this is now part of the A2047)
B2152	A2047 Kingston Road	A2030 Holbrook Road	Originally continued to the A3, but following upgrades the B2152 was cut back to a roundabout with the A2030 with the rest becoming part of the A2030.
B2153 (defunct)	B2151 Victoria Road North in Portsmouth	A3 Commercial Road in Portsmouth	Number shown on a 1923 MoT map along Lake Road (the B2152), so this was likely a typo, but later maps showed the correct route. One portion of route now part of the A2030 and the remainder unclassified.
B2154	Queen Street in Portsmouth	A288 in Eastney	Section east of Victoria Road formerly part of the B2151.
B2155	A288 South Parade in Southsea	B2154 in Southsea	
B2156 (defunct)	A229 (now B2244) at Swale's Green	B2089 at Cripps Corner	Declassified by the end of the 1950s, probably because it was too narrow.
B2156 (defunct)	Capstone Road, Chatham	Albemarle Road	North Dane Way, never completed.
B2157	A26 Boarshead roundabout, Crowborough	B2100 Crowborough Hill, Crowborough	
B2158	A21 Farnborough	A223 Farnborough	Former route of the A21. Originally ran along Homestall Lane in Faversham. Due to its popularity, it was upgraded to the southern section of the original A299 by 1927, but was declassified in the 1930s due to completion of Thanet Way (which became the new A299).
B2159	A2100, Ashdown	A21 and A2102, Silverhill	Originally ran along Medway Street in Chatham, cutting the corner between the A231 and A2. Later became part of the A2 one-way system due to pedestrianization of High Street and rerouting of through routes, but is now unclassified.
B2160	A21 Kipping's Cross roundabout	A228 Beltring	via Matfield and Paddock Wood
B2161 (defunct)	B2160 south of Paddock Wood	B2017 in Five Oak Green	Became a portion of the B2017 in the 2000s when it was rerouted.
B2162	B2015 Yalding	B2169, Lamberhurst Down	
B2163	A26 Barham Court, Teston	A20 near Eyhorne Green	via West Farleigh, Coxheath, Boughton Monchelsea, Chart Sutton, Langley Heath and Leeds
B2164 (defunct)	A251 in Kennington	Willsborough Lees, near current M20 J10	The section from the A251 to the A28 is now unclassified while the remainder is now part of the A2070.
B2165	B2244 Cripps Corner	B2088 Clayhill, 1 mile West of Beckley	via Staplecross and Horns Cross
B2166	B2145 west of North Mundham	A29 north of Bognor Regis station	via Runcton
B2167	A270 Old Shoreham Road, Southwick	A259 Albion Street, Southwick	has 2 arms at northern end
B2168 (defunct)	Bromley Road, Beckenham	Manor Road, Beckenham	Beckenham High Street, formerly a portion of the B230 before it was rerouted to avoid a multiplex with the A222. Upgraded to a portion of the A2015 in 1929.
B2168 (defunct)	A259 Lydd Road in New Romney	A259 Dymchurch Road in New Romney	Sussex Road, declassified by the 1950s.
B2169	A267 Broadwater Down, Tunbridge Wells	A21 Scotney Castle roundabout	via Bells Yew Green and Hook Green
B2170	B2063 at Shorncliffe Camp	A259 in Sandgate	Military Road
B2171 (defunct)	A275 Lewes Road in Newhaven	A259 Brighton Road in Newhaven	Declassified by the 1950s.
B2172 (defunct)	A28 Sedlescombe Road North, Baldslow	B2093 The Ridge, Baldslow	The section along Junction Road is now a spur of the A2100 and the section along Maplehurst Road is now part of the A28.
B2173	M20, M25, A20 at Swanley	A223 at Ruxley Corner	Originally used as a loop off the A259 to serve Shoreham. Although a map shows the route as a Class I route (probably a loop of the A259), it is now unclassified.
B2174	A207/A 226 Crayford Road/Dartford Road, Crayford	A225 Lowfield Street, Dartford	Princes Road Originally used from Stone to Darenth Wood. Downgraded in 1972 due to rerouting of the A2.
B2175	A226 near Northfleet station	A226 Rosherville, west of Gravesend	
B2176	B2027 Chiddingstone Causeway near Penshurst station	A26 east of Bidborough	via Penshurst and Bidborough
B2177	B2150 at Bedhampton	B3354 at Fisher's Pond	Mostly the former A333 Winchester to Portsmouth (Cosham) road. It starts at the traffic light junction with the B2150 north and the B2150 east in Bedhampton and continues to the roundabout where a right turn takes the driver up onto the slopes of Portsdown Hill. It shortly crosses the A3(M) by a high road bridge and continues for several miles westwards on a mainly straight road past several Napoleonic era forts before turning north west, skirting the village of Southwick going through North Boarhunt before reaching Wickham. Passing through the town the road heads north through Waltham Chase until it reaches Bishop's Waltham. The route then heads north west through Lower Upham, past Marwell Wildlife before arriving at the roads end, the junction with the B3354 at Fisher's Pond.
B2178	B2146	A286 in Chichester	
B2179	A286 Main Road, Birdham	B2198 East Wittering	via West Wittering
B2180	B2237 Warnham Road, Horsham	A281 Brighton Road, Horsham	
B2181 (defunct)	A266 (now B2099) at Shover's Green	A265 at Burwash Common	Declassified in the 1970s.
B2182	A259 Little Common roundabout, Bexhill-on-Sea	A269, Sidley, Bexhill-on-Sea	via Cooden Sea Road, Cooden Drive, Richmond Road, West Parade, Marina, Sea Road, Upper Sea Road, High Street, Chantry Lane and Holliers Hill
B2183	A272 in Chailey Common	A275 north of Chailey	
B2184	A272 in Cuckfield	B2036 in Cuckfield	
B2185	A270 Old Shoreham Road, Hove	A259 Kingsway, Hove	The Drive and Grand Avenue
B2187	A259 north of River Arun, Littlehampton	A259 near Ham Manor Golf Club	Originally used from Orpington to Locksbottom. Renumbered as an eastern extension of the A232 in 1935.
B2188	B2176 Penshurst	B2026 King's Standing, about 1 1/2 miles north of Duddleswell	via Fordcombe and Groombridge. Shares route of B2110 between Langton Green and Groombridge
B2189 (defunct)	A229 in Wilsley Green	A229 in Goddard's Green	Route bypassed Cranbrook to the west while the A229 ran through the centre of Cranbrook. The bypass was deemed more important, so the two routes swapped numbers in the 1950s, with the B2159 running through Cranbrook and the A229 bypassing it. While the bypass remains the A229 mainline, the B2189 was declassified.
B2190	A299 at Minster-in-Thanet	B2050 at Manston, Kent	Access road to Kent International Airport. 1.6 miles (2.6 km) long including a 0.4-mile (0.64 km) dual carriageway
B2191	A22 Shinewater roundabout, Eastbourne	A259 Pevensey	eastern section was formerly part of A259
B2192	A26 Earwig Corner, Lewes	B2102 in Blackboys	Former portion of the A265. Originally ran along Carlton Terrace in Portslade. Became a spur of the B2194 after the A293 was rerouted.
B2193	A26 High Street, Lewes	Southover High Street, Lewes	Former routing of the A275.
B2193	A270 at Southern Cross	A259 at Portslade Basin	Former portion of the A293. Duplicate number.
B2194	A293 Trafalgar Road, Portslade	A259 Kingsway, Hove	Victoria Road and Station Road/Boundary Road (with spur to A270 Old Shoreham Road)
B2195	A264 Horsham by-pass	A281 in Horsham town centre	
B2196 (defunct)	Springfield Road in Horsham	South Street in Horsham	Albion Road; became a spur of the A281 by 1945, but is now gone as the Swan Walk shopping center was built on top.
B2197 (defunct)	A259 Worthing Road in Toddington	A284 Wick Street in Wick	Upgraded to a portion of the A259 Littlehampton bypass.
B2198	A286 Main Road, Birdham	finishes at the coast at East Wittering	
B2199	B2146 in Petersfield	A272 in Sheet	Petersfield eastern bypass Originally used from Warnham to Broadbridge Heath, forming a de facto bypass of Horsham. Declassified after the 1970s.
B2200	B284 near Horton Park Golf Club, Ewell	A24 London Road and Cheam Road, Ewell	splits into two at eastern end Originally ran from The Brent to Fleet Downs along Watling Street, formerly a portion of the A296. When the other B2200 was designated, this B2200 was renumbered to the B2500.
B2201	A286 Stockbridge, Chichester	B2145 Sidlesham Common	via Donnington
B2202	B2104 Summerheath Road, Hailsham	A295 Battle Road, Hailsham	Former portion of the A22. Originally continued along High Street and George Street to the A295 North Street; this is now unclassified. Some maps claim the route to be a spur of the B2104.
B2203	A267 High Street, Horam	A265 Mutton Hall Hill, Heathfield	
B2204	A269 Ninfield	A271 near Squirrel Inn, Battle	via Catsfield
B2205	A290/A2990 junction, south of Whitstable	A2990 south of Herne Bay	
B2206 (defunct)	B2205/A291 in Herne Bay	A299 in Broomfield	Former route of A299 before it was rerouted onto Thanet Way around 1933; declassified after Thanet Way was upgraded.
~~B2207~~	unused		
B2208	A22 near Marden Lodge Primary School	B2030 Caterham railway station	
B2209	A24 north of Mickleham	A24 near Box Hill and Westhumble railway station	Old London Road
B2210	A210/A221 Blackfen Road/Penhill Road	A222 Bexley High Street	Blendon Road, Bridgen Road, Parkhill Road
B2211	A224 near Morants Court Farm, Chevening	A25 Sundridge	
B2212	B228 Bromley	B265 Bromley	Road name: Hayes Road
B2213 (defunct)	A210 in Bexley	A2 in Bexley	Downgraded when the junction with the A2 shut down.
B2214	A210, Avery Hill College, Eltham	A222, Lamorbey, Sidcup	Passes Blackfen, University of Greenwich (Avery Hill), Wyncham Stream, River Shuttle; road names: Avery Hill Road, Halfway Street
B2215	A3 south of Send	A3 north-east of Ripley	former route of A3 through Ripley
B2217	A2022 Bolters Lane, Banstead	A2022/B2218 Winkworth Road, Banstead	forms a loop around Banstead
B2218	B2230 Brighton Road, Belmont	A2022 Winkworth Road, Banstead	
B2219	B2217 Bolters Lane, Banstead	B2032 Outwood Lane, Chipstead	
B2220	Tadworth	Walton Heath	
B2221	Tattenham Corner	Burgh Heath	
B2222 (defunct)	A27 in Worthing	A259 in South Lancing	Downgraded to an unnumbered C-road after portions of the route were traffic calmed in 1998.
B2223	A24 Worthing	A259 Worthing	via East Worthing railway station
B2224 (defunct)	A24 in Southwater	A24 in Dial Post	Declassified after the A24 was upgraded in the 1980s.
B2225 (defunct)	A27 in Hammerpot	A269/B2140 in Angmering	Declassified in the 2000s.
B2226 (defunct)	A272 in Midhurst	A286 in Hill Top	Now part of the A286.
B2229	A2042 at South Ashford	A28 at Brookfield, Ashford	
B2230	Rosehill (A217, B278, A297, A297)	A217 south of Belmont	via Sutton town centre. Formerly the A297
B2231	A249 near Swale station	Leysdown-on-Sea	now includes Kingsferry Bridge, part of route has been upgraded to become A2500
B2232 (defunct)	M20 J5, Aylesford	M26 J2A, Wrotham Heath	Downgraded section of the A20; shown on the 1977 AA Road Atlas. Short-lived, it became a portion of the A20 again.
B2233	A27 Crockerhill	A259 Horsemere Green, west of Climping	via Barnham and Yapton
B2234	A3100 Burpham, Surrey	A25 east of Guildford	
B2235	A22/M25 junction 6	A25 Oxted Road, Godstone	less than half a mile long
B2236	A25 High Street, Godstone	A22 south-east of Godstone	Eastbourne Road
B2237	A24 north of Horsham	A24 south of Horsham	via Horsham railway station and town centre
B2238	A26 at South Heighton, Newhaven	Denton corner roundabout (A259)	Possible number for a section of the B2109. The B2238 number is disputed: maps and signs claim the route is still part of the B2109 while others claim the route is the B2238.
B2239 (defunct)			Shown on Phillips Navigator maps from around 2007 on a road cutting the corner between the A267 and B2102 near Cross in Hand. Current OS maps show the route as a spur of the B2102, so the number was changed at that time or it was a typo in the first place. It is unknown if the B2239 number was actually allocated. However, an East Sussex County Council map from 2010 shows the B2239.
~~B2240~~ - ~~B2243~~	unused		
B2244	A21 near Sedlescombe	A229 The Moor, Hawkhurst	formerly part of the A229
B2245	High Street, Dover	Maison Dieu Road, Dover	
B2246	A20 Royal British Legion Village, near Aylesford	A26 Barming	passes Barming station
B2247	A27, north-west of Polegate	B2104 between Polegate and Stone Cross	most of the route was formerly the A27 before the Polegate by-pass was built
B2248	A290 near Canterbury West station	A28 Northgate, Canterbury	part of Canterbury ring road
B2249	A264 Calverley Road near Calverley Park	A264 in Royal Tunbridge Wells	Former portion of the A264.
~~B2250~~ - ~~B2258~~	unused		
B2259	A259 Bognor Regis	A259 Felpham	Previous route of A259 before construction of the North Bersted Bypass and the Felpham Bypass
B2260	Tonbridge	Tonbridge	Tonbridge High Street, former route of the A21
~~B2261~~ - ~~B2271~~	unused		
B2272	A272 west of Haywards Heath	A272 east of Haywards Heath	via Haywards Heath town centre, formerly the A272
~~B2273~~ - ~~B2429~~	unused		
B2430	A244 near M25 junction 9 (eastbound)	A245 Leatherhead	
~~B2431~~ - ~~B2449~~	unused		
B2450	A245 Leatherhead	A24 Leatherhead by-pass	
~~B2451~~ - ~~B2499~~	unused		
B2500	A226 The Brent, east of Dartford	A296 near Darent Valley Hospital	Watling Street
~~B2501~~ - ~~B2519~~	unused		
