= Transport for London red routes =

Arm of Transport for London

Transport for London red routes, officially known as the Transport for London Road Network, are a network consisting of certain major roads in Greater London under the jurisdiction of Transport for London.

== Extent ==
These are 580 km (360 miles) of key non-motorways, which are distinguished by their red road markings and often by signage. The network makes up 5% of the overall road network in London, but carries 30% of traffic.

Transport for London also acts as a London highways authority basic advisor and in particular issues and refers to its influential Streetscape Guidance, standards for roads and streets to make London's roads safer and more efficient.

=== List ===
List of red routes controlled by TfL
Route	Start of TfL control	End of TfL control	Notes
A1 A1	Angel, Islington	Borehamwood	
A10 A10	London Bridge	M25 Junction 25	Including Cycleway 1
A11 A11	Aldgate	Bow Interchange	Including Cycleway 2
A12 A12	Blackwall Tunnel	M25 Junction 28	
A13 A13 *	Aldgate	Purfleet	Including Cycleway 3 *Under private-sector contract
A100 A100	Tower Bridge	Bricklayers Arms	Including Tower Bridge Part of the London Inner Ring Road
A101 A101	Limehouse	Bermondsey	Rotherhithe Tunnel
A102 A102	Lower Clapton	Hackney Wick	
A102 A102	Blackwall Tunnel	Blackheath	Formerly A102(M)
A107 A107	Stamford Hill	Lower Clapton	
A127 A127	Gallows Corner	M25 Junction 29	
A1020 A1020	Beckton	Woolwich Ferry	
A1023 A1023	Tower Bridge	Limehouse Link	
A1202 A1202	Aldgate	Old Street	Part of the London Inner Ring Road
A1205 A1205	Bow	Poplar	
A1261 A1261 *	Limehouse	Leamouth	* Under private-sector contract
A1400 A1400	M11 Junction 4	Gants Hill	
A2 A2	Borough	Bexley	
A20 A20	New Cross	Ruxley	
A21 A21	Lewisham	M25 Junction 4	
A22 A22	Purley	Whyteleafe	
A23 A23	Kennington	Chipstead	
A24 A24	Clapham Common	Nonsuch Park, Cheam	Including Cycleway 7
A200 A200	London Bridge	Bermondsey	Including Cycleway 4
A201 A201	King's Cross	Bricklayers Arms	Including Cycleway 6
A202 A202	Victoria	New Cross	Including Cycleway 5 and Vauxhall Bridge Part of the London Inner Ring Road
A203 A203	Vauxhall	Brixton	
A205 A205	M4 Chiswick	Woolwich Ferry	South Circular Road
A210 A210	Lee	Eltham Green	
A214 A214	Wandsworth	Streatham	
A217 A217	Rosehill	Belmont	
A232 A232	Nonsuch Park, Cheam	Locksbottom	
A240 A240	Kingston Bypass	Worcester Park Road	
A243 A243	Kingston Bypass	Ashtead Common	
A2213 A2213	Kidbrooke	Lee	
A3 A3	London Bridge	Ditton Hill	Except Elephant & Castle to A2 Including Cycleway 7 and London Bridge Part of the London Inner Ring Road
A30 A30	Cranford	Staines	
A302 A302	Parliament Square	Elephant & Castle	Except Waterloo to the Imperial War Museum Part including Cycleways 3 and 6, and Westminster Bridge
A306 A306	Barnes	Roehampton	
A312 A312	Northolt	Hanworth	
A316 A316	Chiswick	Sunbury-on-Thames	
A3036 A3036	Vauxhall	Westminster Bridge	
A3200 A3200	Westminster Bridge	London Bridge	
A3203 A3203	Millbank	Lambeth	Lambeth Bridge only
A3204 A3204	Vauxhall	Elephant & Castle	Part of the London Inner Ring Road
A3205 A3205	Vauxhall	Wandsworth	Including Cycleway 8
A3211 A3211	Westminster	Tower Bridge	Including Cycleway 3
A3212 A3212	Westminster	Battersea Bridge	Including Cycleway 8
A3220 A3220	The Westway	Clapham Common	Including Battersea Bridge Part formerly M41
A4 A4	Hyde Park Corner	Longford	
A40 A40	The Westway	Uxbridge	Part formerly A40(M)
A41 A41	Baker Street	M1 Junction 4	
A400 A400	Euston	Camden Town	
A406 A406	M4 Chiswick	Beckton	North Circular Road
A4180 A4180	Northolt	Ruislip	
A4200 A4200	Camden Town	Mornington Crescent	
A4202 A4202	Marble Arch	Hyde Park Corner	Part of the London Inner Ring Road
A5 A5	Hyde Park Corner	Warwick Avenue	Part of the London Inner Ring Road
A501 A501	The Westway	Old Street	Part of the London Inner Ring Road
A503 A503	Camden Town	Seven Sisters	
A5205 A5205	Warwick Avenue	Regent's Park	

== Policies ==
=== Lack of charging for parking ===
As of 2024, TfL does not charge for parking on the network.

=== Introduction of 20 mph speed limits ===
In 2015, TfL introduced the introduction of a speed limit of 20 mph on certain red routes, as part of a pilot program to reduce road deaths. In 2018 and 2023, TfL announced the introduction of a speed limit of 20 mph for certain red routes across central London.

== Management ==
The TfL London Streets roundel (2007–2014)

The division of Transport for London responsible for the network was known as London Streets until 2018. It was known as TfL Street Management for many years until 2007.

From 2007 London Streets used a blue and grey variant of the Transport for London roundel hosting the "Streets" name. This was withdrawn in 2014.

== Other highways ==
Motorways within London are the responsibility of National Highways.

The rest of the streets are the responsibility of the London boroughs – or natural person or corporate owners predominantly in the case of the small percentage of roads that are private roads, and over which the law provides for shared responsibilities with users in the case of public rights of way.

== See also ==
- Red route#Painted lines
