= Northfleet Urban Country Park =

Country park in Kent, England

- Location within Kent
- OS grid: TQ627734
- Coordinates: 51°26′42″N 0°21′07″E
- Area: 10.5 hectares (26 acres)
- Created: 1996
- Operator: Gravesham Borough Council,
- Open: 7 days a week, dawn until dusk
- Website: Official website

Northfleet Urban Country Park is in Northfleet, in Kent, England. The site is land encompassed by Springhead Road, Thames Way, west of Vale Road and (on its northern boundary) the railway (the Dartford to London railway). The site is owned by and managed by Gravesham Borough Council.

== History ==
The site was used for orchards / farming until the 1940s, when it (and others along the railway) was used as a chalk pit. This went down to about 8‐10m deep.

On 7 May 1957, planning was given for a refuse tip on the site, and on 10 December 1992, landfill gas venting trenches were installed. Gravesend Council permitted the formation of an urban country park containing a lake, woodlands, meadows, wetlands and trim trail, play area and toilets/kiosk/seating area in August 1996. The site was landscaped with the importing of 130,000m^{3} of cleaned topsoil, to raise the level of the land between two and four metres. New resurfaced footpath and cycle routes were then constructed on the 2 plateaued land.

Later the site was further landscaped by extensive native tree, shrub and wildflower plantings, creating various wildlife habitats including a wetland swale.

== Location ==
The park lies to the west of Gravesend and can be accessed on its eastern side from Vale Road and on its western side from Springhead Road.
