= A226 road =

Road in southeast England

A226

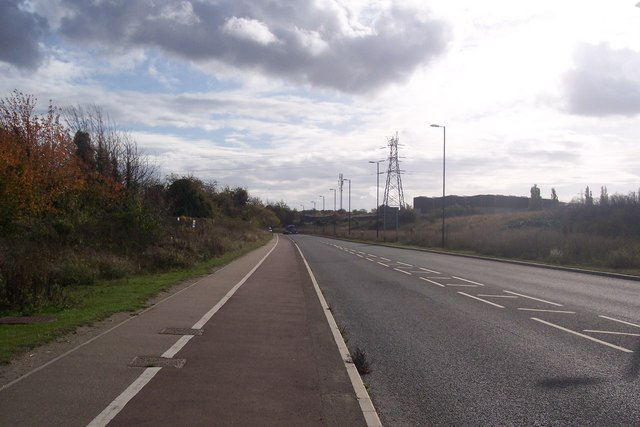
- The A226 Thames Way heading towards Northfleet - this road leads from Ebbsfleet Station on the Channel Tunnel Rail Link towards Springhead Road. Springhead Enterprise Park is on the right in the background.

Route information
- Length: 11 mi (18 km)

Major junctions
- West end: Crayford; 51.4488°N 1.1896°E
- A207 A2018 A2026 A225 A296 A206 A2260 A227 A289; A2
- East end: Rochester; 51.3968°N 0.4844°E

Location
- Country: United Kingdom
- Constituent country: England

Road network
- Roads in the United Kingdom; Motorways; A and B road zones

The A226 road travels in a west–east direction in southeast London and north Kent, from Crayford in the London Borough of Bexley, through Dartford, Gravesend to Strood. It is about 15.7 miles in length.

== Route ==
The road begins with an end-on junction with the A207 to the east of the town of Crayford. in the London Borough of Bexley in Both roads are marked on street maps as being part of the Roman road Watling Street; although the A207 is Crayford Road, the A226 being Dartford Road. After 1 mile (1.6 km) the road becomes West Hill where the descent into the valley of the River Darent and the town of Dartford begins. At the foot of the hill the clockwise ringroad is encountered: the original road continued through what is now the pedestrianised High Street. Roads making up the Ring Road are (from the west): Highfield Road; Westgate; Home Gardens; Market Street; Lowfield Street (which continues south as the A225 road); and Instone Road.

Beyond the Ring Road is East Hill, still part of Watling Street. At its top the road becomes The Brent: a junction here takes traffic south-east on the A296 road to connect with the Dartford Crossing. The Brent crosses a bridge over the A282 road here. This is the only part of the M25 which not a motorway, where it crosses the River Thames by tunnel and bridge.

From here the road follows a somewhat undulating course as it passes through areas of chalk which have been excavated for the cement industry, many of which factories having been closed down. The villages of Stone, Greenhithe and Swanscombe all lie along this stretch of the road.

Due to the construction of Ebbsfleet International Station in 2006/2007, the route was altered. The road now heads right (via Thames Way) under the Channel Tunnel Rail Link and then left, past the International station (and its many car parks) and Sawyer's Lake. This new route is also used by Fastrack Buses Route B (between Dartford and Gravesend). The A226 then passes Northfleet Urban Country Park (on a former waste dump) before following partially, a dismantled railway route to Northfleet.

It then rejoins the London Road, near the Northfleet suburb of Rosherville. The former route is now the B2175.

Then Gravesend is reached.

As with Dartford, Gravesend has a ring road: this takes traffic around the town centre via Bath Street, West Street, Harmer Street, Milton Road, Parrock Street (where there is junction with the A227 road), Windmill Street, Stone Street, Rathmore Road and Pelham Road. The A226 continues along Milton Road and east to the Lion Roundabout. It by-passes south of the village of Chalk via the 1930s "Arterial road". This section of the A226 also follows the 1711 turnpike road between Gravesend and Rochester. The next village, lying mainly to the north of the road, is Higham; immediately following that is the junction with the dual-carriageway A289, the Medway Towns Northern Relief Road.

The final section of the road crosses the B2018 and then drops down to the Medway valley until the junction with the A2 (Watling Street) in Strood.

== History ==
=== Pre-1922 road lists ===
Before road numbering began in the United Kingdom, the road was part of the major route between London and Dover, the road taken by all traffic heading for mainland Europe. When the Ministry of Transport published its first list of road numbers, however, the building of the A2 had already begun; and the earliest map shows the projected route of that latter road; the previous road being relegated to what is now the A226.

=== Swanscombe road collapse ===
On April 10, 2023, a large section collapsed in Swanscombe. This remained the road closed.
