= Red route =

Two terms used in the UK regarding highways

On United Kingdom roads, the term red route may refer to a stretch of road with painted red lines signifying that vehicles cannot stop there, or to a road which has historically high accident rates.

== Painted lines ==
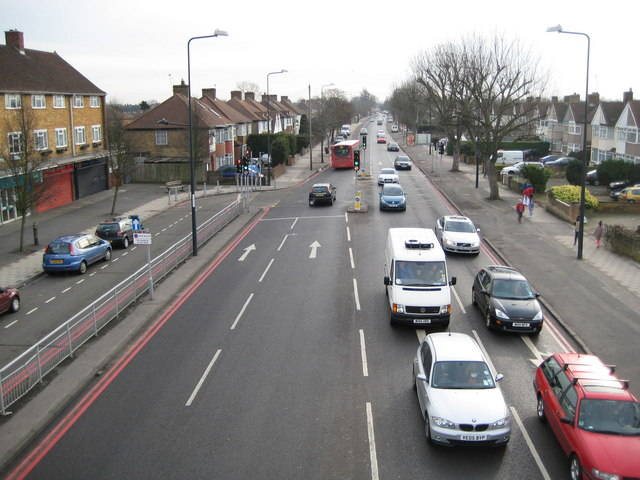
The A312 Uxbridge road marked with double red lines

Red routes are major roads with red lines at the sides showing where vehicles are not allowed to stop. The prohibition extends to stopping for loading or unloading, and to boarding or alighting from a vehicle (except for licensed taxis and the holders of blue badges). Red routes are mainly used on major bus and commuting routes.

Red routes are marked by red lines on the sides of the road. Double red lines mean that the rules and regulations apply at all times and on all days. Single red lines means that the prohibition applies during times displayed on nearby signs or at the entry to the zone. Red route clearways are signed but there are no lines on the road. Stopping is only permitted in lay-bys (red lines are only marked at junctions).

The lines were first introduced in London in 1991, and have also been applied in the county of West Midlands since 2003, Leeds since 2019, and Derbyshire since 2026. A similar scheme operates in Edinburgh; here, however, the routes affected (where marked by the use of green road-surfacing rather than red lines – usually on outer bus lanes on major bus routes) are known as greenways. Away from bus routes, conventional red lines are used.

The 390 miles of red routes in London are policed by "Red Route Patrols", an arm of Transport for London.

A number of hospitals in the United Kingdom have mimicked the red road lines, in and around ambulance dispatch and Accident and Emergency areas. These road markings are to allow ambulances and other emergency vehicles uninhibited access in and out of such areas; whilst these road markings are often respected by road users there is very little (if any) enforcement.

=== History ===
The Red Routes scheme was developed by the Department for Transport following the abolition of the Greater London Council in 1986 to address concerns that there was no London-wide road transport policymaking body.

A Traffic Director for London was appointed by the Department for Transport in 1991 to "streamline the flow of traffic in London" and oversee a London-wide strategy for road transport.

The director was responsible for creating a Network Plan, deciding on the priorities for road travel in London and how best to manage traffic flows. Roads in the Network Plan became the responsibility of the Traffic Director rather than localised London boroughs. The lines were first introduced in north and east London in 1991.

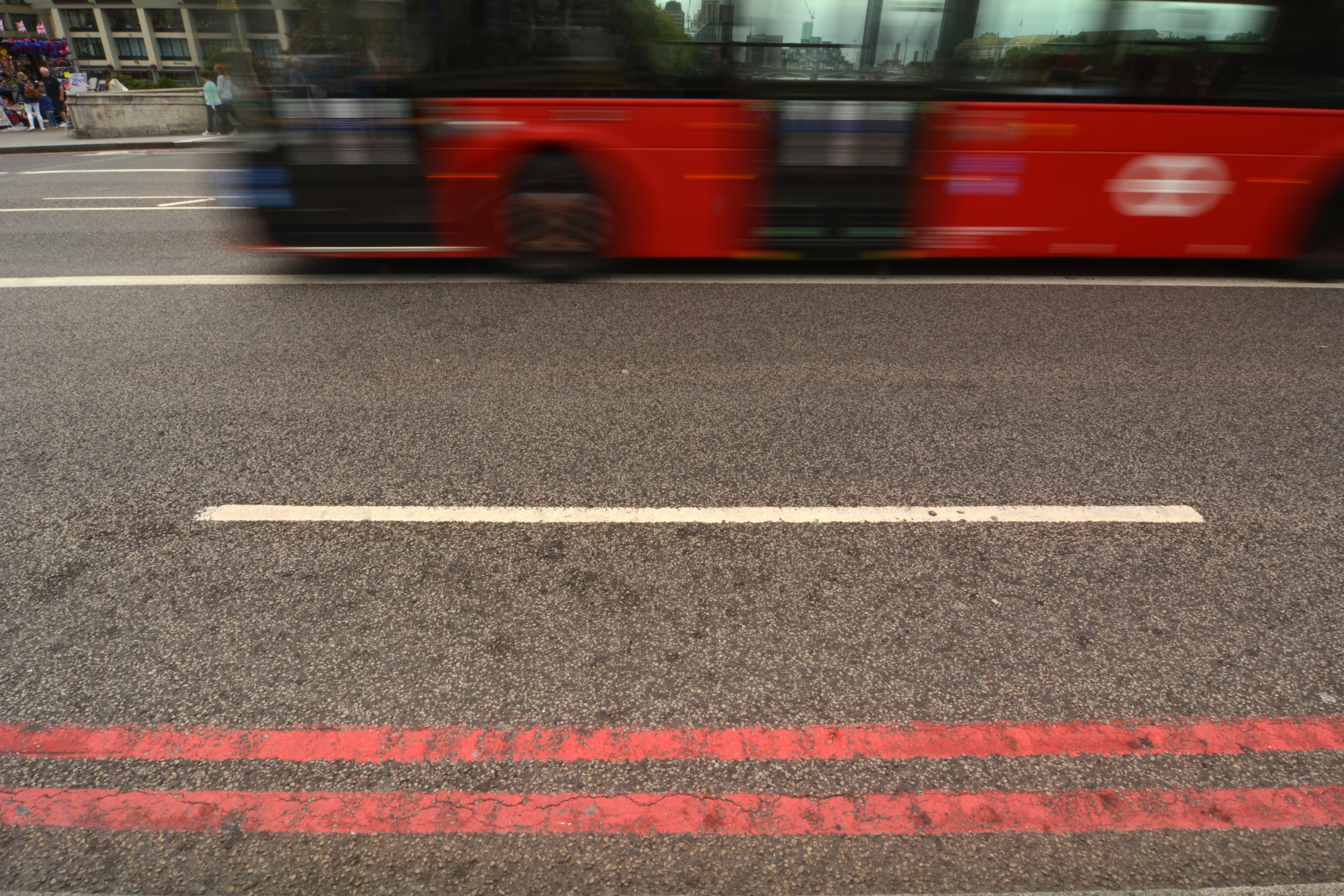
Double red lines on Westminster Bridge

In 1998, the Traffic Director identified nine priorities for the Red Routes scheme:

1. to facilitate the movement of people and goods in London—reliably and safely, and with minimum overall environmental impact;
2. to encourage walking;
3. to improve conditions for cyclists and contribute to the National Cycling Strategy;
4. to provide better conditions for people with disabilities;
5. to provide priority for buses so as to achieve their efficient movement;
6. to improve the local environment and reduce the impact of congestion;
7. to contribute to London's targets for reduced traffic accidents and road vehicle emissions;
8. to support reduced car commuting, especially into or across inner London;
9. to assist measures to reduce traffic on local roads by providing the first choice for non-local traffic, consistent with achieving the other aims for Red Routes.

Between 1997 and 2000, transport policy in the United Kingdom became a devolved matter under Tony Blair, with the Senedd in Wales and the Scottish Parliament assuming control over nationwide and regional transport strategy in their respective nations. When London was granted a devolved assembly and authority, which came into effect in 2000, regional transport strategy became the responsibility of the Mayor of London.

The Greater London Authority (GLA) Act 1999, which established the devolved administration in London, gave the Mayor of London a General Transport Duty to "develop and implement policies for the promotion and encouragement of safe, integrated, efficient and economic transport facilities and services to, from and within Greater London". Transport for London (TfL) became the highway authority for all roads under GLA control.

The Greater London Authority Act 1999 passed the management of motorways wholly within London and trunk roads over to the GLA. This caused several roads to be renumbered in London, including the A102(M) Blackwall Tunnel (to A102), the A40(M) Westway (to A40) and the M41 West Cross Route (to A3220).

=== London ===
Red routes in London are known as Transport for London red routes, officially known as the Transport for London Road Network (TLRN).

== High accident rates ==
In Somerset, the local road safety partnership has designated some of the A roads within the county as red routes, indicating that they have a higher than average accident rate.

The term has been similarly used to denote dangerous routes in Northamptonshire. It was not clear whether the scheme would be maintained following the 2013 closure of the Road Safety Partnership whose initiative it was.

Lincolnshire has a scheme similar to the Northamptonshire one.

The county of Cheshire, including the town of Warrington, also use the idea of red routes to designate roads with historically high accident rates.

The former Suffolk speed camera organisation chose the expression red route to denote routes where high levels of accidents justify the frequency use of mobile speed cameras.

Leicestershire County Council elected in 2008 not to implement a red route scheme, believing it can be misleading and arbitrary. It believes in identifying or solving individual danger spots instead.

== See also ==
- Accident blackspot
- Clearway
- Double yellow lines
