= Golden Cross, East Sussex =

Village in East Sussex, England

Coordinates: 50.890830°N 0.18503018°E

Golden Cross
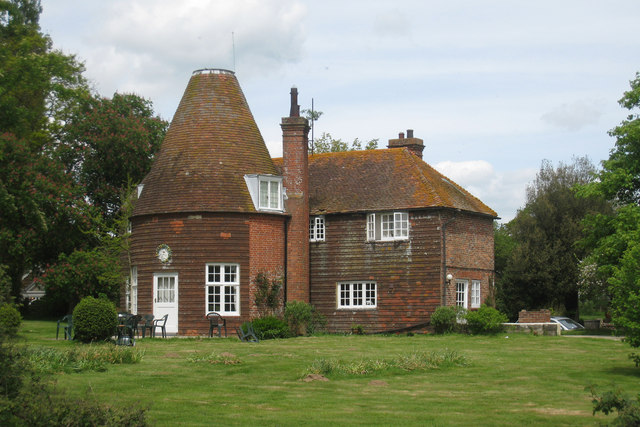

- Location within East Sussex
- OS grid reference: TQ5377612423
- District: Wealden
- Shire county: East Sussex
- Region: South East
- Country: England
- Sovereign state: United Kingdom
- Post town: HAILSHAM
- Postcode district: BN27 4
- Dialling code: 01323
- Police: Sussex
- Fire: East Sussex
- Ambulance: South East Coast
- UK Parliament: Wealden

Golden Cross is a village in the Wealden district of East Sussex, England. Its nearest town is Hailsham, which lies approximately 3 1/2 miles (6 kilometres) southeast of the village. The village lies on the A22 road in the parish of Chiddingly.
