= Rotherhithe Tunnel =

Road tunnel under the Thames in London, England

A101

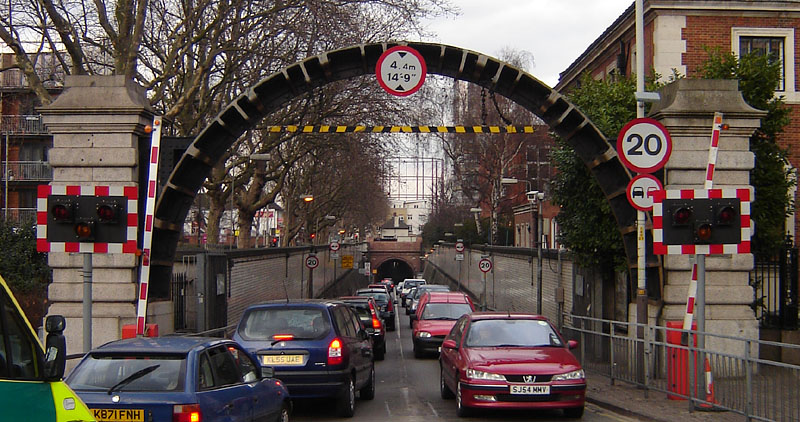
- Rotherhithe Tunnel, southern approach arch

Route information
- History: Begun in 1904, completed in 1908

Major junctions
- North-East end: A13 in Limehouse
- South-West end: A200 in Rotherhithe

Location
- Country: United Kingdom
- Constituent country: England

Road network
- Roads in the United Kingdom; Motorways; A and B road zones

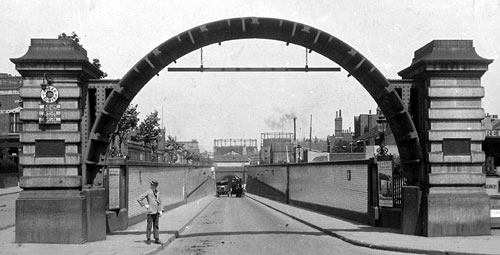
The Rotherhithe entrance of the Rotherhithe Tunnel, 1909

The Rotherhithe Tunnel, designated the A101, is a road tunnel under the River Thames in East London, connecting Limehouse in the London Borough of Tower Hamlets north of the river to Rotherhithe in the London Borough of Southwark south of the river. It was formally opened in 1908 by George, Prince of Wales (later King George V), and Richard Robinson, Chairman of the London County Council. It is a rare example of a road tunnel where road traffic, pedestrians and cyclists all share the same tunnel bore. Transport for London took over ownership and maintenance of the tunnel in 2001.

It should not be confused with the nearby earlier Thames Tunnel, designed and built under the supervision of Marc Isambard Brunel and his son Isambard Kingdom Brunel, used by London Overground for the Windrush line.

== Construction ==
Thames Tunnel (Rotherhithe and Ratcliff) Act 1900
- Act of Parliament
- Parliament of the United Kingdom
- Long title: An Act to empower the London County Council to make a tunnel or subway under the River Thames between Rotherhithe and Ratcliff and approaches thereto and for other purposes connected therewith.
- Citation: 63 & 64 Vict. c. ccxix

Dates
- Royal assent: 6 August 1900

Following the success of the Blackwall Tunnel, opened in 1897, the London County Council (LCC) decided to construct another toll-free road crossing of the River Thames located in the heart of the then flourishing London Docks, midway between Tower Bridge and the Blackwall Tunnel. When originally opened the route served the Surrey Commercial Docks on the south side and Limehouse and West India Docks on the north side. The tunnel was authorised by the Thames Tunnel (Rotherhithe and Ratcliff) Act 1900 (63 & 64 Vict. c. ccxix). Designed by Sir Maurice Fitzmaurice, the engineer for LCC, it copied closely the Blackwall Tunnel; however it is of larger diameter. At the time of its construction, the tunnel was said to be "the largest subaqueous tunnel in existence". The tunnel's construction, especially the long approach ramps, displaced nearly 3,000 local residents and generated considerable local opposition. In 1903, the LCC built new tenement blocks in Swan Lane (now Swan Road), Clarence Street and Albion Street in Rotherhithe and Brightlingsea Buildings on Ropemaker's Field in Limehouse. These blocks had more modern facilities but the rents charged were significantly higher and many soon moved out of the area.

The tunnel was constructed between 1904 and 1908 by resident engineer Edward H. Tabor and contractors Price and Reeves, at a cost of about £1 million (equivalent to around £105 million in 2025). It was excavated partly using a tunnelling shield and partly by cut-and-cover. Two tunnelling shields were employed. The first was used in the very challenging and difficult ground conditions encountered on the south side and under river sections, whilst a second lighter, shorter shield was employed on the north side where the ground conditions were better. The first shield was only able to be used in a straight line, whilst the second one could be steered through gentle curves. The tunnelling was constructed under compressed air and the river-bed lined with puddle clay. No construction workers were killed owing to the extensive safety precautions undertaken; a rarity at that time for a project of this size and complexity. The entrance arches have been formed from cutting edges from the second tunnelling shield, which measured 30 feet 8 inches (9.35 m) in diameter, forming in effect a loading gauge for the tunnel.

== Physical characteristics ==
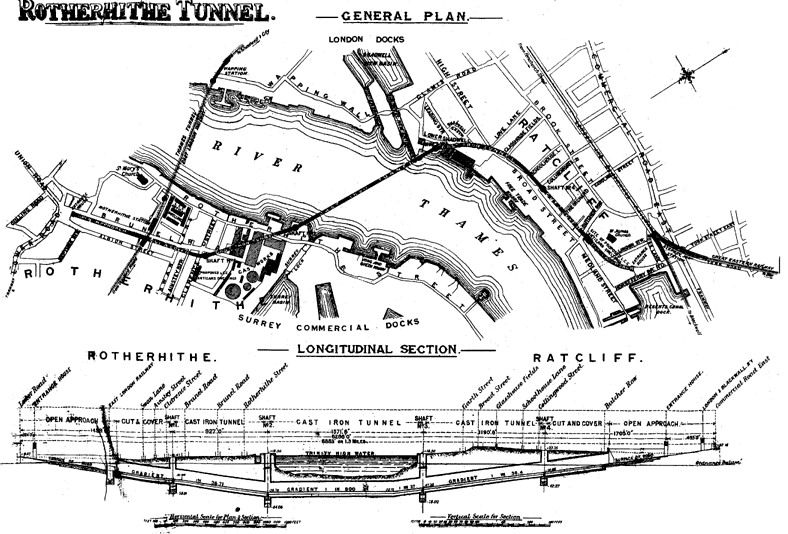
Sectional map of the Rotherhithe Tunnel, 1906

The tunnel consists of a single bore, 4,862 feet (1,482 m) long, carrying a two-lane carriageway 48 feet (15 m) below the high-water level of the Thames, with a maximum depth of 75 feet (23 m) below the surface. Four shafts were sunk alongside the tunnel to aid construction, later ventilation and entrance shafts. The shafts are numbered 1 to 4, south to north.

Shaft 1 is located on the corner of Brunel Road and Canon Beck Road in Rotherhithe (51°30′07″N 0°02′59″W). It contains ventilation fans that supply fresh air to the tunnel. It is a single storey circular redbrick building, originally constructed without a roof. It now has a high roof containing three large vents. Also within the shaft is a floodgate dating from 1939 which protects the nearby London Overground.

Shaft 2 is located along the river front close to Rotherhithe Street Bascule Bridge on the south side of the river (51°30′15″N 0°02′56″W). Shaft 3 is the corresponding shaft on the north side located by the river in King Edward VII Memorial Park (51°30′31″N 0°02′54″W). They are both single storey circular redbrick buildings with ornate ironwork grilles in the large side openings and granite dressings. Each contain an iron spiral staircases that were originally pedestrian access points but were closed in the 1970s due to low usage and security concerns. The shaft buildings were originally capped with a dome glass roof (similar to that at Greenwich Foot Tunnel) however these were removed in the 1930s in a bid to improve ventilation within the tunnel. New roofs were added in 2007 to a different design. The staircases having been open to the elements for more than 70 years suffered extensive corrosion and were fully refurbished the same year. The shaft buildings and staircases for these two shafts were Grade II heritage listed in 1983. Both shafts contain ventilation fans which are primarily used to extract foul air from the tunnel however the low height of these shaft buildings prevents efficient dilution and dispersal of pollutants.

Shaft 4 is located on the corner of The Highway and Heckford Street (51°30′38″N 0°02′40″W). The original redbrick circular building was demolished in 1967 to allow widening of The Highway to four lanes which now extends over half the shaft. A plain surface building was constructed to house the fresh air supply fans.

Pedestrian access to the tunnel is now limited to the portals; however there are granite staircases topped with ornate lighting columns close to each portal as an alternative to the footpaths on the approach ramps.

The tunnel is entered via a sloping brick-lined cutting at each end leading to the entrance portal. Both portals are faced with pink granite and were given Grade II heritage listing in 1983. On the Rotherhithe side (south side) the approach road spans over the platforms of Rotherhithe London Overground station. It was originally planned the tunnel would commence before the railway was reached however during construction this was changed to be north of this instead thus shortening the tunnel by 160 feet (50 m). It is followed by a short cut-and-cover section until the first of the four shafts is reached. The tunnelled section is between shafts 1 and 4, measures 3,689 feet (1,124 m) long and is lined with cast iron segments.

The tunnel bore was sized to the maximum that the technology of the time allowed. Even then it was recognised this would result in less than ideal lane widths with each lane only 2.4 m (7 ft 10 in) in width (modern equivalent road width is 3.6 m (12 ft)) and footways typically 1.2–1.4 m (3 ft 11 in – 4 ft 7 in) wide on each side of the roadway. The tunnel is shallow, with a maximum gradient of 1 in 36 (2.8%), to cater for non-mechanised traffic. It includes sharp bends at the location of the shafts. This allowed the sections between the shafts to be straight, thus reducing the complexity of construction and avoiding the foundations of the docks. An urban myth is that the bends were installed to prevent horses from seeing daylight at the end of the tunnel too early, which might make them bolt for the exit.

The sharp bends and narrow lanes do however make the tunnel unsuitable for large vehicles. Due to this, and issues with vehicle emissions, Transport for London enforces a ban on vehicles more than 2 metres high or wide. Also banned are vehicles with a maximum authorised mass of over 2 tonnes. In the first eight months of 2021, a total of 75,387 violations were issued, generating over £5m of revenue for TfL.

The speed limit is 20 miles per hour (32 km/h) and is enforced using average speed cameras.

The tunnel bore was originally lined throughout with white glazed tiles, installed by two separate contractors, Boote's installed the tiling for north half and Edwards for the south. A 3 ft (0.9 m) band of brown tiles at the centre point of the tunnel demarcated the boundary. After repeated failures of the tiling in the southern half, these were removed in 2011 and replaced with a sprayed gunite surface, detracting significantly the look and feel of the tunnel. The shafts are lined with white glazed bricks, Shaw's installing them for shafts 3 and 4 on the north side and Stourbridge for shafts 1 and 2 on the south side. White glazed brickwork is used externally on the approach roads.

A 2003 survey rated the tunnel the tenth most dangerous tunnel in Europe due to its poor safety features. Its proximity to the river also makes it vulnerable to flooding, as happened in the 1928 Thames flood.

== Usage ==
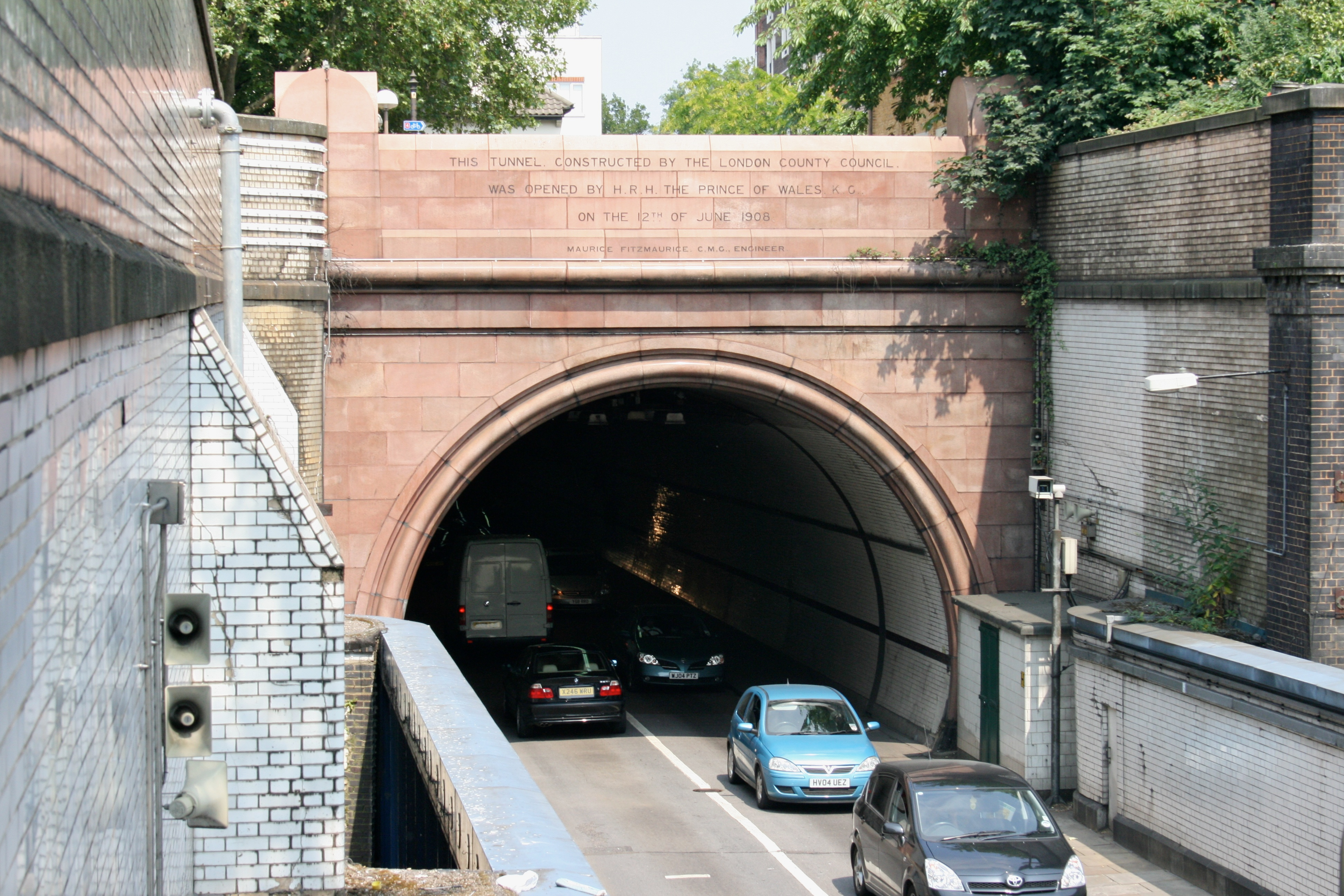
The southern tunnel portal.

Like many other London tunnels and bridges, the tunnel carries far more traffic than it was designed for. Shortly after opening 2,600 vehicles a day, mostly horse-drawn, and 14,000 pedestrians a day were using the tunnel – figures which were seen as easily justifying the expense of its construction. By 1955, usage had quadrupled to 10,500 vehicles a day and by 1997 usage had tripled again, to over 34,000 vehicles a day. The heavy usage, particularly during rush hours, can lead to significant congestion and tailbacks.

The junctions at either side of the tunnel constrain further growth and therefore current traffic levels have remained at 1997 levels. Pedestrian numbers are now very low at around 20 per day, whilst cyclists number between 150 and 200 per day.

The launch of the Ford Model T car only months after the tunnel opened initiated a rapid increase in car ownership and by the late 1920s motor vehicles had all but replaced horse-drawn vehicles, which were banned from the tunnel in 1952. The original ventilation system consisted of two fans supplying fresh air in each of shafts 1 and 4 to a duct below the roadway which in turn feed via 28 grilles spaced evenly along the road into the tunnel. In 1930, following several incidents, including one where 49 people were taken to hospital, the ventilation was upgraded with more powerful fans and extract fans were added in shafts 2 and 3. As traffic has increased, periodically the ventilation fans have been upgraded however the underlying concept has remained the same.

Alternative crossings include Tower Bridge to the west or the Greenwich foot tunnel to the east. Rotherhithe station is almost adjacent to the southern tunnel entrance, and Limehouse (in Ratcliffe Lane) is the closest station to the northern entrance.

Local buses used to pass through the tunnel. Route 82 ran between Stepney East Station (now Limehouse) and St. Marychurch Street in Rotherhithe, before being withdrawn in 1968. The tunnel remained unserved until route P14 commenced in 1988 from Surrey Quays and the Isle of Dogs. This route was withdrawn and partially replaced by a new 395 route in 1999, running from Limehouse (Burdett Road) instead of the Isle of Dogs. The 395 route was withdrawn without replacement on 28 April 2006 due to low passenger usage. By this time, it was the only Transport for London bus route that still used minibuses, in the form of three Mercedes-Benz Sprinters operated by First London, which were necessary due to the tunnel's width restriction.

One iteration of the opening credits of the 1970s TV series The Professionals feature the Rotherhithe Tunnel whilst the 1951 film Pool of London features a police chase scene in the tunnel and shoot-out up and around the shafts. The video for The Specials' song "Ghost Town" was partially filmed in the tunnel.

== See also ==
- List of crossings of the River Thames
- List of tunnels in the United Kingdom
- Tunnels underneath the River Thames
- Thames Tunnel
