= A272 road =

Road in southern England

A272

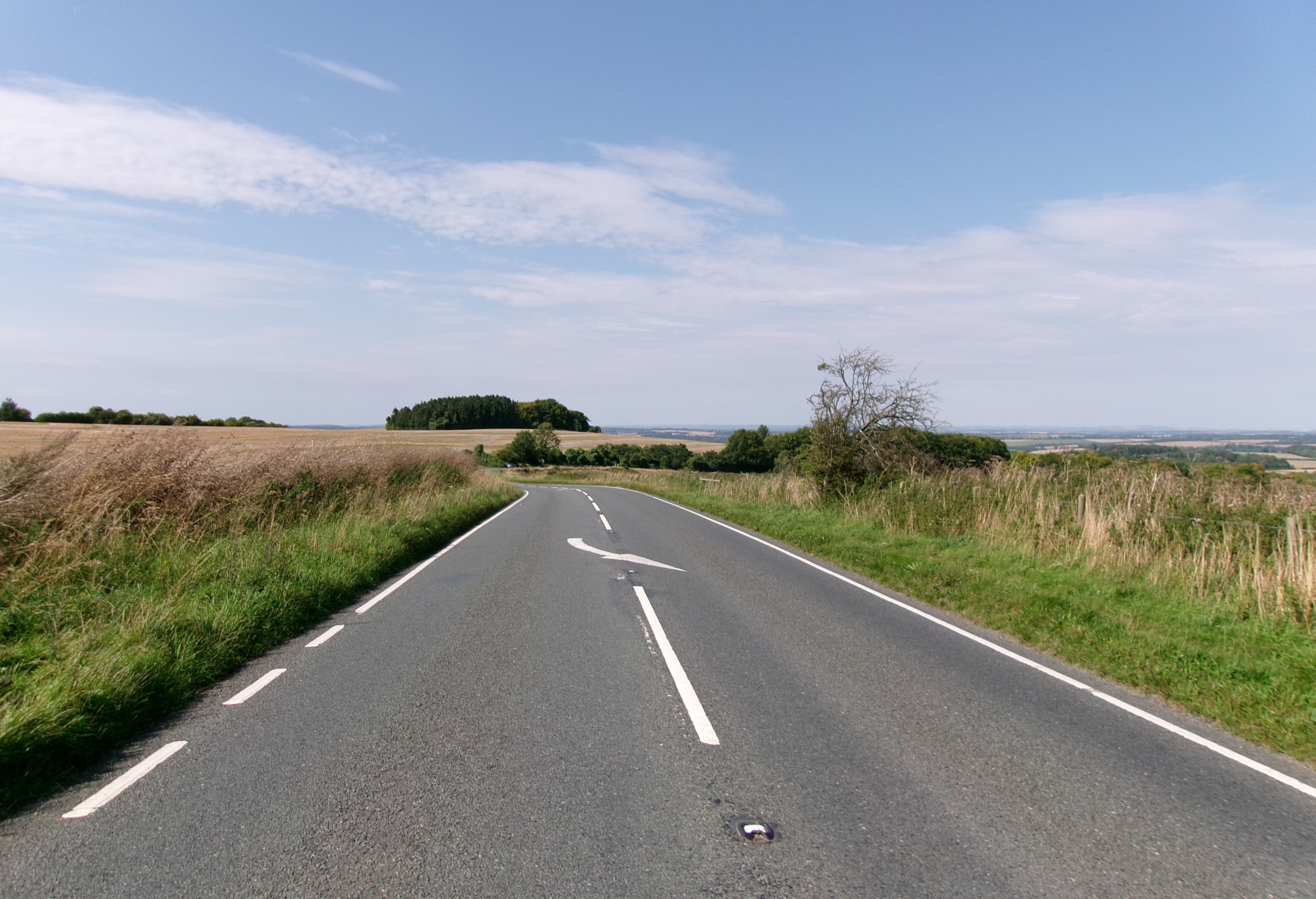
- A272 westbound at Cheesefoot Head

Route information
- Length: 86 mi (138 km)

Major junctions
- East end: Five Ashes (near Heathfield); 50.9939°N 0.2133°E
- A22; A23; A24; A26; A29 A267 A273 A275 A283 A286; A3; A31; M3; A34; A33; A30
- West end: South Wonston (between Winchester and Andover); 51.1410°N 1.3828°W

Location
- Country: United Kingdom
- Primary destinations: Winchester; Petersfield; Uckfield

Road network
- Roads in the United Kingdom; Motorways; A and B road zones

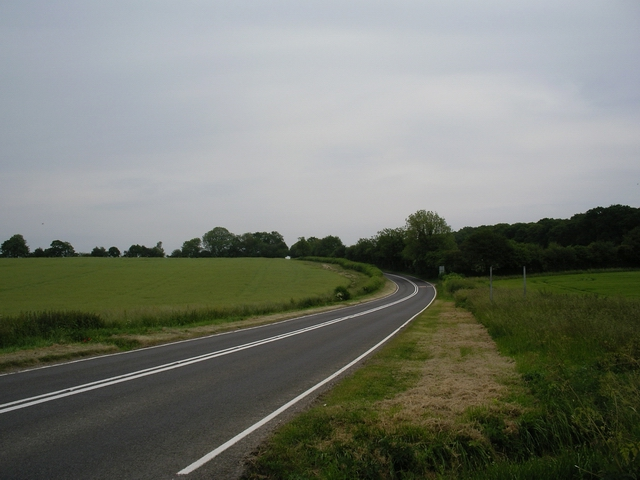
The A272 between Petersfield and Winchester

The A272 is a road in southeast England. It follows an approximate east–west route from near Heathfield, East Sussex to the city of Winchester, Hampshire.

== Route ==
The eastern end of the A272 starts at a junction with the A267, 1.5 miles (2.4 km) north-west of the village of Cross-in-Hand, East Sussex. It heads west, crossing the A26 and A22 north of Uckfield, and continues through Newick before going over the border into West Sussex at a point east of Scaynes Hill. It then bypasses the town of Haywards Heath and continues west, crossing the main London-Brighton A23 road at Bolney.

The road crosses the A24 and then passes through a number of villages and small towns in West Sussex, such as Billingshurst, Petworth and Midhurst. It then crosses the county boundary into Hampshire and reaches Petersfield, where it crosses the A3 to the west of the town. The final section passes the National Trust property of Hinton Ampner and rises high on to the Hampshire downs, passing Cheesefoot Head, before descending to merge with the A31 at Chilcomb to the east of Winchester.

In former years, the A272 continued north-west from Winchester to Stockbridge, but this section has now been redesignated as the B3049. Today, after 1.3 miles (2.1 km) it re-emerges from the A31 to run north to the Winnall Roundabout, Junction 9 of the M3. Here it merges with the A34, passing east and north of Winchester (with limited access to the A33 northbound), before re-emerging near Littleton. It then runs NW along the Andover Road (formerly B3420), terminating at the A30 in the parish of Barton Stacey, an overall length of 85 miles (137 km). To the north the B3420 continues across the River Test to Wherwell and Andover.

== Features ==
The A272's route is predominantly rural, despite being only 40 miles (64 km) from the centre of London at its nearest point. Most of it passes through countryside, villages and small towns, and the only built-up area of any size that it traverses is Haywards Heath and its surrounding villages. There is very little dual carriageway—just three very short sections between Petworth and Midhurst—and it therefore gives the driver an experience which is reminiscent of English country roads as they were in the middle of the 20th Century.

It has been said that the A272 follows part of the route that was taken by pilgrims travelling between the cathedral cities of Winchester and Canterbury. However, this is unlikely because, for most of its length, it passes through the low weald of Sussex. Prior to the development of modern roads, this was difficult for travellers, because of the extensive forest and tracts of low-lying marshy ground. The more likely route was the Pilgrims' Way, which followed the chalk escarpment of the North Downs.

== In popular culture ==
The A272 is mentioned as part of the route Pablo Picasso will take as part of his bicycle ride in the first episode of Monty Python's Flying Circus.

== See also ==
- Great Britain road numbering scheme
