= A23 road =

Major road in the United Kingdom

A23

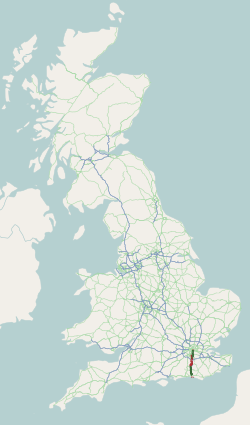

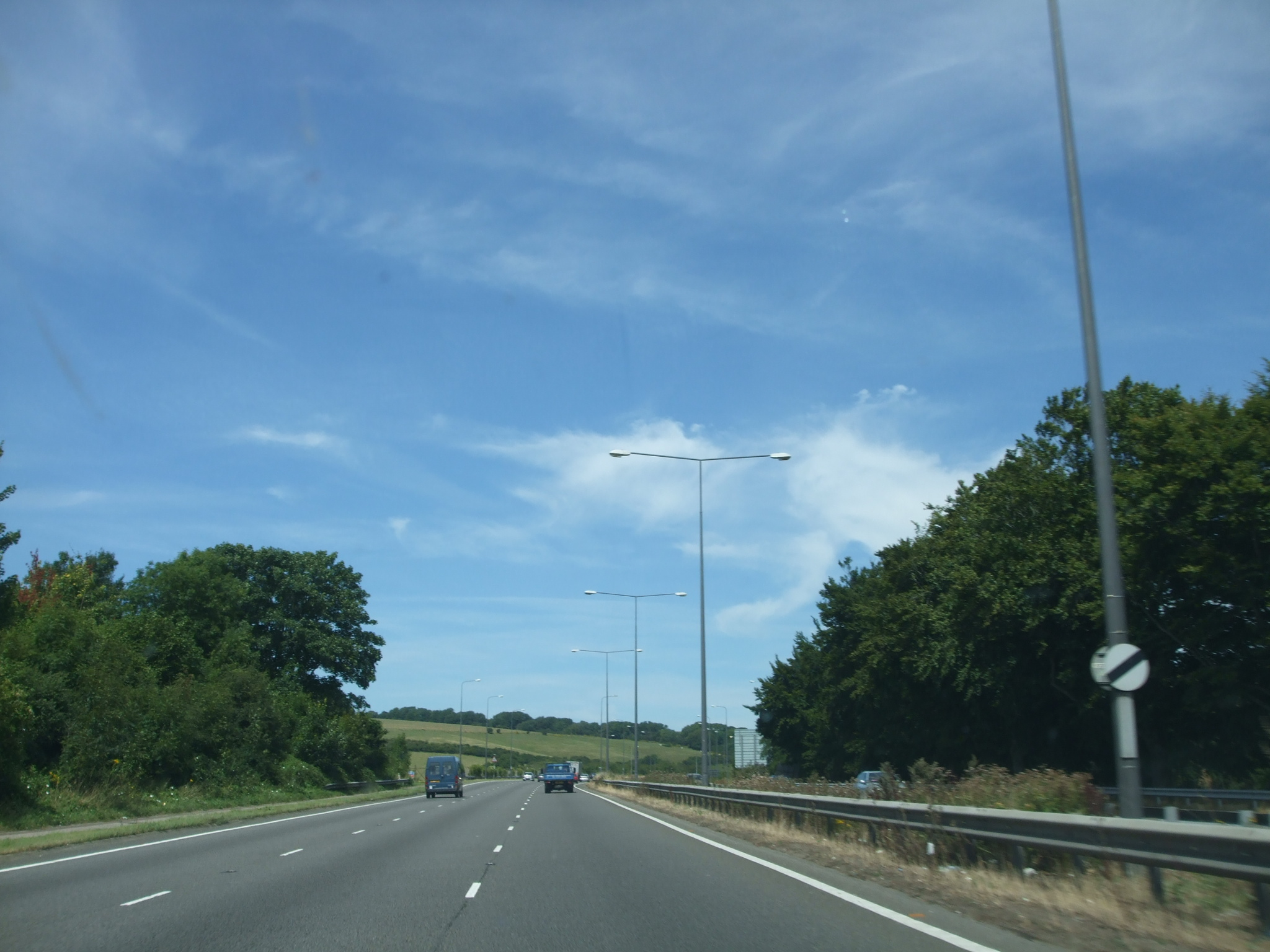
- The A23 near Patcham, East Sussex.

Route information
- Length: 51.2 mi (82.4 km)

Major junctions
- South end: A259 in Brighton50.830°N 0.138°W

- A27 in Brighton A272 in Bolney M23 / A264 in Crawley M23 in Merstham; A22 in Purley, London A232 near Croydon A214 in Streatham A205 near Streatham A203 in Brixton A202 in Kennington
- North end: A3 in London (Waterloo)51.498°N 0.112°W

Location
- Country: United Kingdom
- Counties: East Sussex, West Sussex, Surrey, Greater London
- Primary destinations: Croydon; Redhill; Reigate; Gatwick Airport; Crawley

Road network
- Roads in the United Kingdom; Motorways; A and B road zones
← A22	→ A24

The A23 road is a major road in the United Kingdom between London and Brighton, East Sussex, England. It is managed by Transport for London for the section inside the Greater London boundary, Surrey County Council and West Sussex County Council for the section shadowed by the M23 motorway, National Highways (as a trunk road) between the M23 and Patcham, and by Brighton and Hove Council from the A27 road to the centre of Brighton.

The road has been a major route for centuries, seeing numerous upgrades, bypasses and diversions.

== Route ==
The A23 begins near Lambeth North tube station. Formerly, it started as Westminster Bridge Road near Waterloo station, but this is now part of the A302. Almost immediately it turns south; the straightness of much of the heading south shows its Roman origins.

The road becomes:

- Kennington Road: 1 mile (1.6 km) long; near Kennington Park it joins the A3 (Kennington Park Road), but soon bears south again, becoming in turn over the next 5 miles (8.0 km):
- Brixton Road
- Brixton Hill
- Streatham Hill
- Streatham High Road
- at Norbury the road becomes London Road; after 1.25 miles (2 km), at
- Thornton Heath the Croydon bypass, Thornton Road and then Purley Way (known for its superstores, particularly IKEA, and for the site of Croydon Airport) takes the place of the original road through Croydon, now the A235, rejoining the A23 at Purley near the Purley War Memorial Hospital, now named Brighton Road.
- continuing south through Coulsdon on the Farthing Way (the relief road for Coulsdon town centre, opened in 2006), over the North Downs to Hooley, the start of the M23 motorway.
  - here is now Surrey
- through the built-up areas of Merstham, Redhill and Salfords, skirting Horley
  - here is now West Sussex
- making an end-on connection with the M23 spur to Gatwick Airport the A23 becomes a dual carriageway as it is diverted round the airport; it rejoins the original route at Lowfield Heath and continues south into Crawley as London Road
- Crawley bypass: the original road was through the town
- Pease Pottage, southern junction with the M23
- through the relatively rural countryside of West Sussex, before following along valleys to cross the South Downs and entering Brighton
  - here is now East Sussex
- becomes the London Road, Brighton, passing under the London Road railway viaduct
- the road ends at Old Steine, Brighton, at a roundabout intersecting with the coastal A259 road, and opposite the entrance to the Palace Pier.

== Major roads intersected by the A23 ==
- A3 and A202 at Kennington
- A205 South Circular Road at Streatham Hill
- A214 at Streatham
- A232 at Waddon
- M23 close to Junction 7 (no southbound access)
- A25 at Redhill
- A264 at Crawley
- M23 at Pease Pottage
- A272 at Bolney
- A27 Brighton Bypass at Mill Road Roundabout

== History ==
What is now the A23 became an arterial route following the construction of Westminster Bridge in 1750 and the consequent improvement of roads leading to the bridge south of the river by the turnpike trusts. The increase in population of Brighton in the late eighteenth century, which transformed it from a small fishing village to a large seaside resort, enhanced the importance of this road, as did the residence there of George IV, as Prince of Wales, who made Brighton a place of fashion.

When roads were originally classified in 1923, the northern terminus of the A23 was at Purley. The road north of this section, including Purley Way, which opened to traffic in April 1925, was part of the A22 (which ran from central London to Eastbourne). The current route north to Westminster Bridge dates from April 1935.

The A23 in London has frequently been one of the city's most congested roads. The M23 motorway was originally proposed to run as far north as Streatham, relieving congestion on the route, but the section north of Hooley was never built. At junction 7 of the M23 motorway, signs for the northbound M23 (which terminates a few miles to the north) simply read "Croydon" with no other London destinations marked.

In July 2000, control of the section of road inside the Greater London boundary was transferred from the Highways Agency to Transport for London. This caused delays to a planned relief road of Coulsdon, which had been announced in 1998. The then mayor, Ken Livingstone apologised in 2002 that TfL was unable to construct the relief road due to a lack of funds. The road was eventually completed in 2007, and which under TfL's ownership had acquired a bus lane that suffered ridicule for not having any buses actually running on it.

On 18 March 2010, plans to widen the section between Handcross and Warninglid in West Sussex to three lanes, removing an accident prone bend, were given the go ahead. Work started in autumn 2011 and the scheme was completed and opened in October 2014, with a better-than-expected improvement to safety.

== London to Brighton Veteran Run ==
The 53-mile (85 km) road from London to Brighton forms the basis of the route of the annual London to Brighton Veteran Car Run. This is featured in the film Genevieve, although most of the rural motoring scenes were shot in Buckinghamshire. The A23 is also used for various other London to Brighton events, although in many cases part of the route diverges to parallel roads to reduce congestion or add variety.

== Junction list ==
County	Location	mi	km	Destinations	Notes
East Sussex	Brighton	0.0	0.0	A259 (Marine Parade / Grand Junction Road) / Maderia Drive – Rottingdean	Southern terminus
East Sussex	Brighton	0.7	1.1	Lewes Road (A270 east) to A27 – Lewes	Western terminus of A270
East Sussex	Brighton	0.8	1.3	A270 west (Fleet Street) – Hove	Information signed northbound only; northern terminus of A270 concurrency
East Sussex	Brighton	1.1	1.8	A270 west (Old Shoreham Road) – Hove	
East Sussex	Brighton	3.8– 4.2	6.1– 6.8	A27 – Worthing, Lewes	
West Sussex	Pyecombe	5.5	8.9	Begin freeway	
West Sussex	Pyecombe	5.5– 6.3	8.9– 10.1	A273 north to A281 – Hassocks, Pyecombe, Henfield, Newtimber	To A281, Henfield, and Newtimber signed southbound only; southern terminus of A273
West Sussex	Pyecombe	6.7	10.8	A281 north-west – Henfield	No southbound exit; south-eastern terminus of A281
West Sussex	Newtimber	7.1– 7.3	11.4– 11.7	Private access	
West Sussex	Newtimber	7.6	12.2	Private access	Southbound exit and entrance only
West Sussex	Newtimber–Hurstpierpoint and Sayers Common boundary	8.0– 8.2	12.9– 13.2	B2117 to B2118 – Hurstpierpoint, Albourne, Sayers Common, Hickstead	Northbound exit and southbound entrance
West Sussex	Hurstpierpoint and Sayers Common	10.8	17.4	B2118 – Hurstpierpoint, Albourne, Henfield, Sayers Common	Southbound exit and northbound entrance
West Sussex	Twineham–Bolney boundary	11.3– 12.3	18.2– 19.8	A2300 east – Burgess Hill, Goddards Green, Twineham, Hickstead Village	Goddards Green signed northbound only; western terminus of A2300
West Sussex	Bolney	12.7– 13.2	20.4– 21.2	A272 to A2300 – Petersfield, Haywards Heath, Cuckfield, Burgess Hill, Bolney, Ansty, Cowfold	To A2300, Cuckfield, Burgess Hill, and Bolney signed northbound only
West Sussex	Bolney	14.0	22.5	Bolney	Southbound exit only
West Sussex	Bolney	14.1– 14.8	22.7– 23.8	Services	Northbound exit and entrance
West Sussex	Ansty and Staplefield	15.1– 15.4	24.3– 24.8	B2115 to B2114 – Warninglid, Slaugham, Cuckfield, Staplefield	
West Sussex	Slaugham	17.2– 17.5	27.7– 28.2	B2110 – Handcross, Lower Beeding	No southbound exit
West Sussex	Slaugham	18.9	30.4	B2114 to B2110 – Handcross	Southbound exit only
West Sussex	Crawley	19.7– 20.0	31.7– 32.2	M23 north / A264 / B2114 to M25 – Horsham, Broadfield, Pease Pottage, London	To M25, London, Gatwick, and East Grinstead signed southbound only; southern terminus of M23
West Sussex	Crawley	20.0	32.2	End freeway	
West Sussex	Crawley	20.9	33.6	A2004 north-east (Southgate Avenue) – Town centre, Southgate, Tilgate	South-western terminus of A2004
West Sussex	Crawley	21.5	34.6	A2220 (Horsham Road) to A264 – Town centre, Horsham, Southgate, West Green, Broadfield, Bewbush, Faygate	
West Sussex	Crawley	23.4	37.7	A2011 east / A2219 south / Langley Drive to A264 / M23 – Town centre, East Grinstead, London, Langley Green, Northgate, Pound Hill, Three Bridges	Western terminus of A2011; northern terminus of A2219
West Sussex	Crawley	26.8	43.1	M23 – East Grinstead	Southbound exit only
West Sussex	Crawley	26.9– 27.1	43.3– 43.6	Gatwick Airport to M23	Northbound exit and entrance
Surrey	Charlwood	27.4	44.1	A217 north / Povey Cross Road – London, Reigate, Charlwood	Southern terminus of A217
Surrey	Salfords and Sidlow	30.5	49.1	A2044 north-west (Woodhatch Road) to A217 – Woodhatch, Reigate	Information signed northbound only; south-eastern terminus of A2044
Surrey	Redhill	32.6– 33.0	52.5– 53.1	A25 west – Reigate	Part of A25 concurrency
Surrey	Redhill	32.8	52.8	A25 east (Station Road) – Godstone	Part of A25 concurrency
Surrey	Redhill	33.8	54.4	A242 south-west (Gatton Park Road) to A25 – Reigate, Dorking	North-eastern terminus of A242
Surrey	Reigate and Banstead	36.1	58.1	M23 south to M25 – Gatwick Airport, Brighton, Heathrow Airport, Dartford	Southbound exit and northbound entrance; northern terminus of M23
Greater London	Croydon	38.3	61.6	A237 north (Brighton Road) to B2030 – Sutton, Coulsdon, Old Coulsdon, Caterham	Only A237 and Coulsdon signed southbound; southern terminus of A237
Greater London	Croydon	38.9	62.6	Caterham, Old Coulsdon	Southbound exit and northbound entrance
Greater London	Croydon	40.5	65.2	A22 south (Godstone Road) / A235 north (Brighton Road) / A2022 east – East Grinstead, Kenley, Sanderstead, South Croydon	Direct access to A235 and South Croydon northbound only; southern terminus of A2022 concurrency; northern terminus of A22; southern terminus of A235
Greater London	Croydon	40.6	65.3	A2022 west (Foxley Lane) – Banstead, Woodcote	Northbound access only; northern terminus of A2022 concurrency
Greater London	Croydon	42.5– 42.7	68.4– 68.7	A232 east / B271 (Stafford Road) / B275 (Denning Avenue) – Croydon, Wallington, South Croydon	A232 and Croydon signed northbound only; southern terminus of A232 concurrency
Greater London	Croydon	42.7	68.7	A232 west (Croydon Road) – Sutton, Wallington	Information signed northbound only; northern terminus of A232 concurrency
Greater London	Croydon	44.0	70.8	A236 (Mitcham Road) / Canterbury Road – Croydon, Wimbledon, Mitcham	
Greater London	Croydon	44.7	71.9	A235 south (London Road) to B266 – Croydon, Selhurst, Thornton Heath	Northern terminus of A235
Greater London	Lambeth	46.9	75.5	A214 east (Streatham Common North) – Crystal Palace, Norwood	Southern terminus of A214 concurrency
Greater London	Lambeth	47.2	76.0	A214 west / B242 south-west – Clapham Junction, Wimbledon, Tooting, Balham	Northern terminus of A214; information signed northbound only
Greater London	Lambeth	47.3	76.1	A216 south-west to A214 – Mitcham, Wimbledon, Sutton	Information signed southbound only; north-eastern terminus of A216
Greater London	Lambeth	48.5	78.1	A205 (South Circular) / A24 / A3 / A21 / A20 / A2 – Clapham Junction, Lewisham, Bromley, Tulse Hill	
Greater London	Lambeth	49.5– 49.7	79.7– 80.0	A204 south (Effra Road) – Herne Hill	No access from A23 north to A204 south; northern terminus of A204
Greater London	Lambeth	49.7	80.0	A2217 (Acre Lane / Coldharbour Lane) – Camberwell Green	No access from A23 south to A2217
Greater London	Lambeth	49.9	80.3	A203 north-west – West End of London, Vauxhall, Stockwell	No access from A23 south to A203; south-eastern terminus of A203
Greater London	Lambeth	51.1	82.2	A202 west – West End of London A202 east to A2 / A20 – Peckham, Camberwell Green	No access from A23 north to A202 east, or from A23 south to A202 west
Greater London	Lambeth	51.2	82.4	A3 north – City of London	Northern terminus; no access from A23 north to A3 south
1.000 mi = 1.609 km; 1.000 km = 0.621 mi: Concurrency terminus

== See also ==
- Great Britain road numbering scheme
