= A214 road =

Road in south London

Coordinates: 51.4578°N 0.1828°W

A214

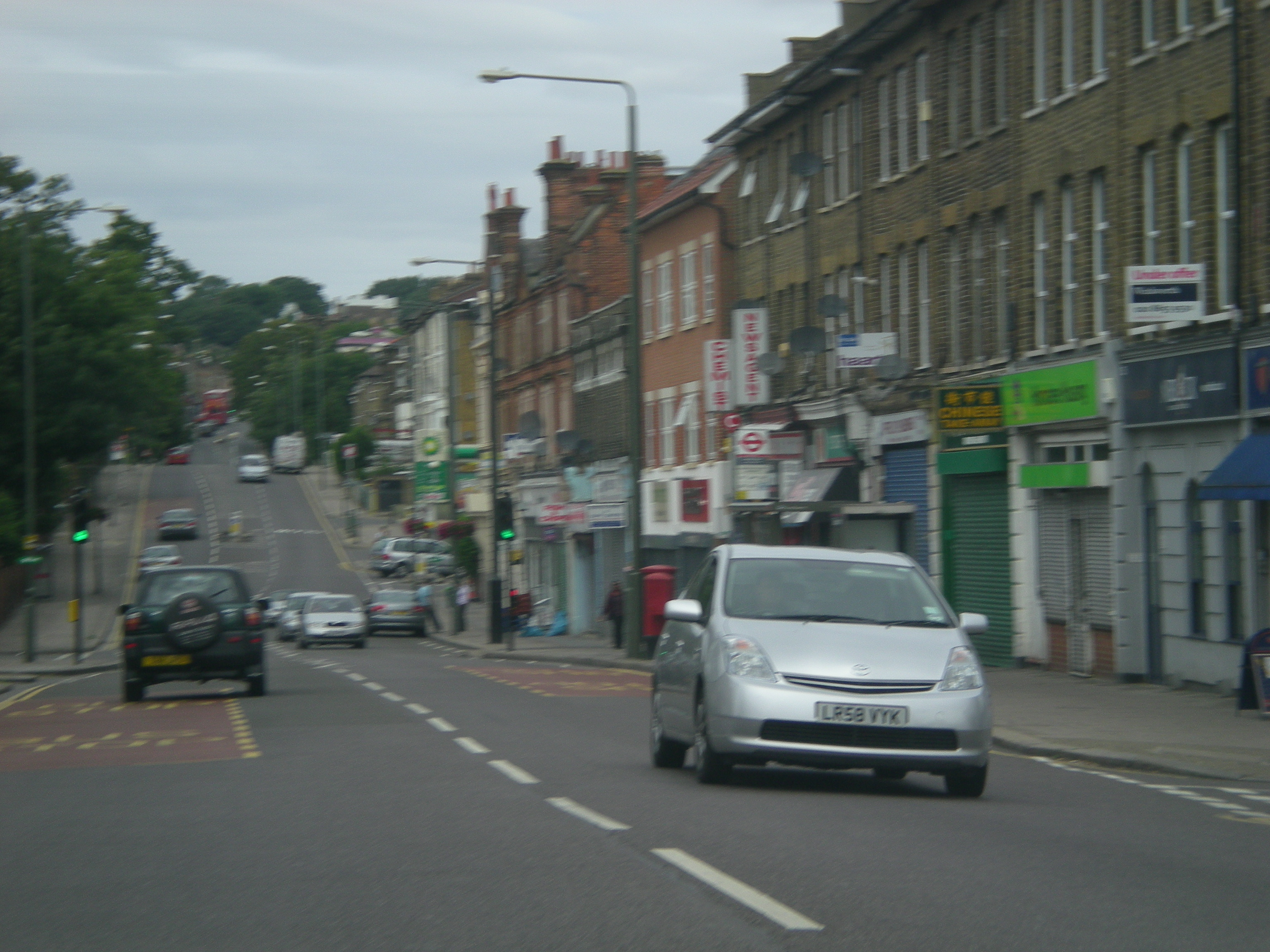
- The A214 road running through Anerley.

Major junctions
- East end: West Wickham
- A23; A24 A205 A212 A213 A215 A217 A232; A3 A3205
- West end: Wandsworth

Location
- Country: United Kingdom

Road network
- Roads in the United Kingdom; Motorways; A and B road zones

The A214 is a part primary, part non-primary A road in London, England. It runs from Wandsworth to West Wickham.

== London Ringways ==
The section at Wandsworth, which is part of Trinity Road, was to be part of the London Ringways and is built as a three lane dual carriageway between Wandsworth Roundabout and Dorlcote Road.

== Route ==
The route runs through the London Borough of Wandsworth, London Borough of Lambeth, London Borough of Croydon and London Borough of Bromley, passing through Tooting Bec, Streatham, West Norwood, Crystal Palace, Anerley, Elmers End and Eden Park.
