= A200 road =

Road in London, England

Coordinates: 51.5060°N 0.0882°W

A200

Route information
- Length: 4.1 mi (6.6 km)

Major junctions
- West end: London Bridge
- A3 A2205 A100 A101 A2208 A2209 A206
- East end: Greenwich

Location
- Country: United Kingdom
- Constituent country: England

Road network
- Roads in the United Kingdom; Motorways; A and B road zones

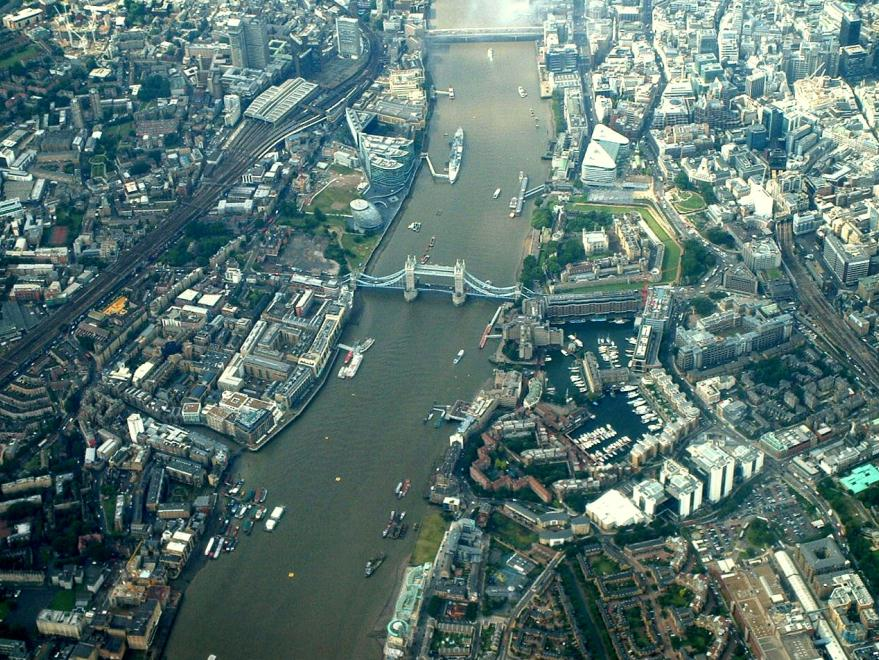
The western end of the A200 can be seen on the left of this photo, running between the river and the railway line

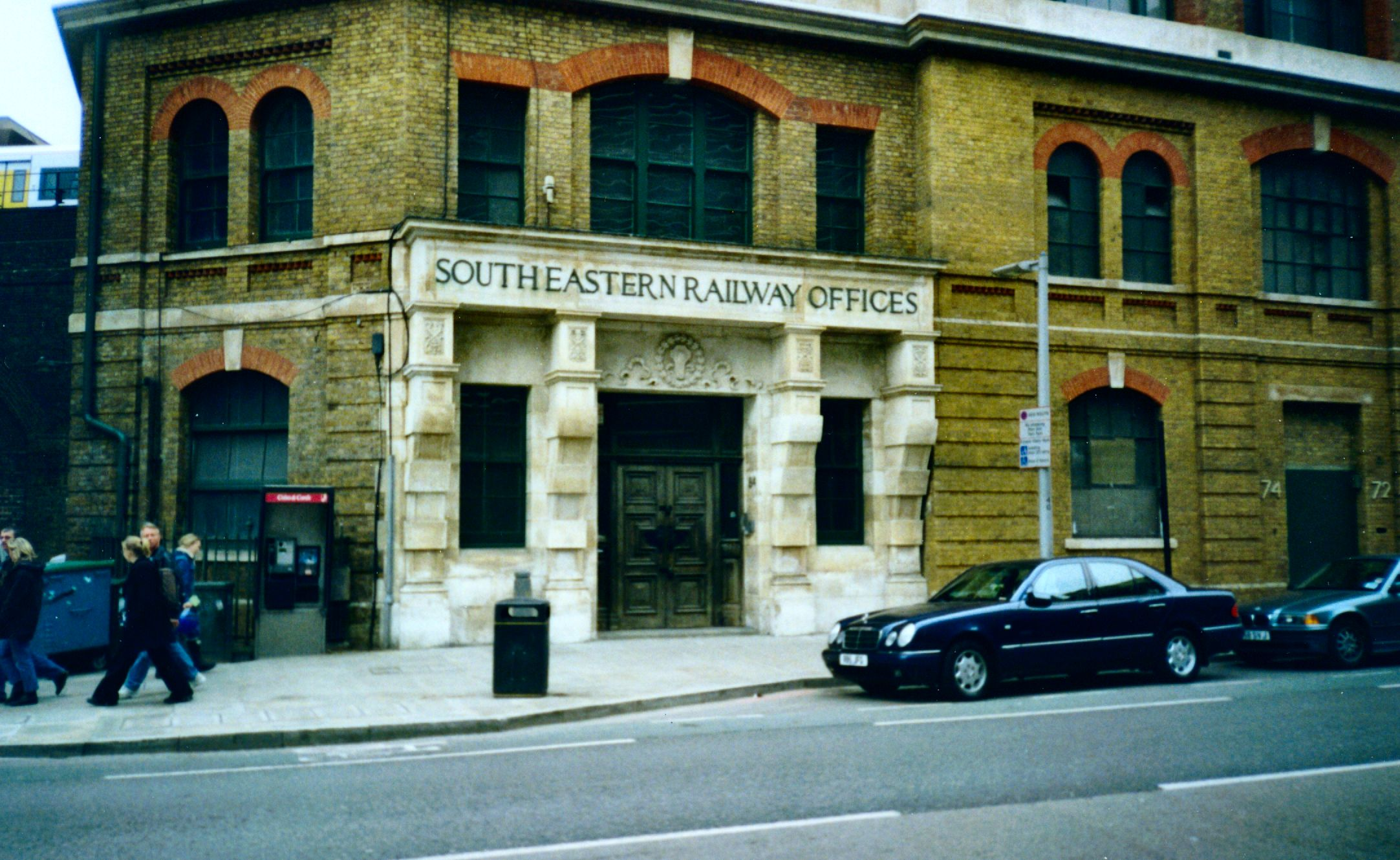
Former South Eastern Railway offices on Tooley St

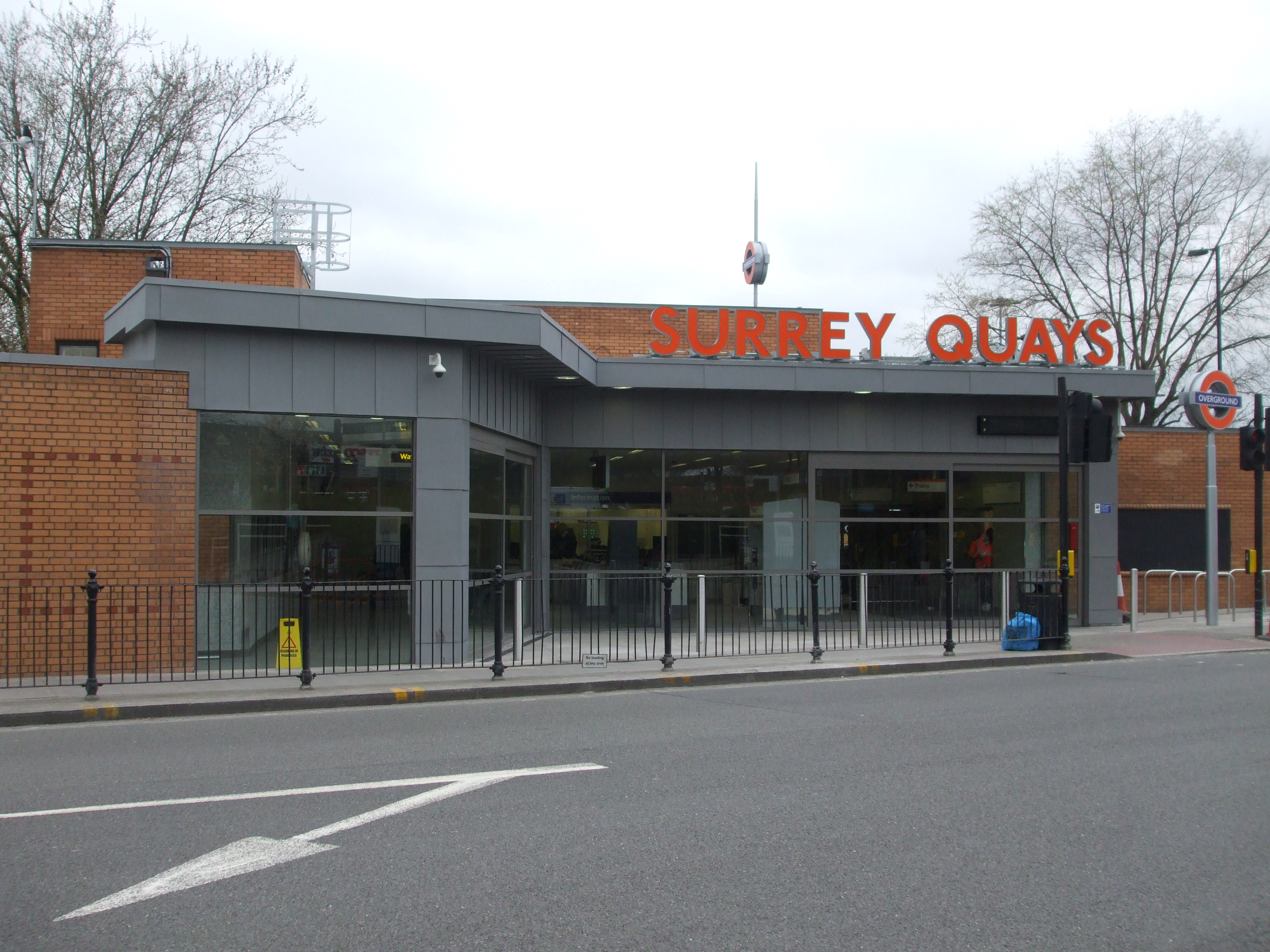
Surrey Quays railway station on Lower Road

The A200 is an A road in London running from London Bridge to Greenwich.

Cycleway 4 will follow most of the A200 road.

== Route ==
=== Tooley Street ===
The name derives from St Olave's Street, after the Church of St Olave. For much of its history the street has been lined with warehouses, and in 1861 Scovell's warehouse caught fire, resulting in the largest peacetime fire in the Port of London.

=== Jamaica Road ===
Tooley Street becomes Jamaica Road at Shad Thames. A little over halfway down (from the Tower Bridge end) lies Bermondsey Underground station, which is served by the Jubilee line. A thoroughfare of shops follows, and the road continues on until Culling Circus roundabout, where it turns roughly 90 degrees south towards Deptford and becomes Lower Road. Brunel Road and the Rotherhithe Tunnel also meet at this junction. King's Stairs Gardens and Southwark Park lie at the south-eastern end.

=== Lower Road ===
Lower Road runs for roughly 1 mile (1.6 km), past Surrey Quays shopping centre until it reaches Deptford, where it becomes Evelyn Street. Southwark Park runs the length of Lower Road, to the west.

=== Evelyn Street ===
Named after diarist John Evelyn, the street runs from the Plough Way junction south to the junction with Deptford Church Street. There is both a McDonald's and a KFC along this stretch.

=== Creek Road ===
Creek Road continues over a lifting bridge at Deptford Creek then joins the A206 at the Greenwich one-way system by the Cutty Sark.
