= A22 road =

Road in southern England

A22

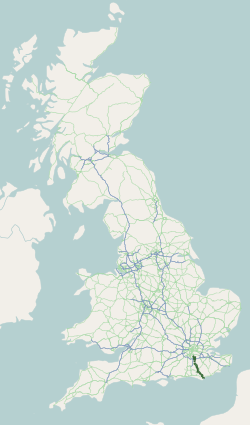

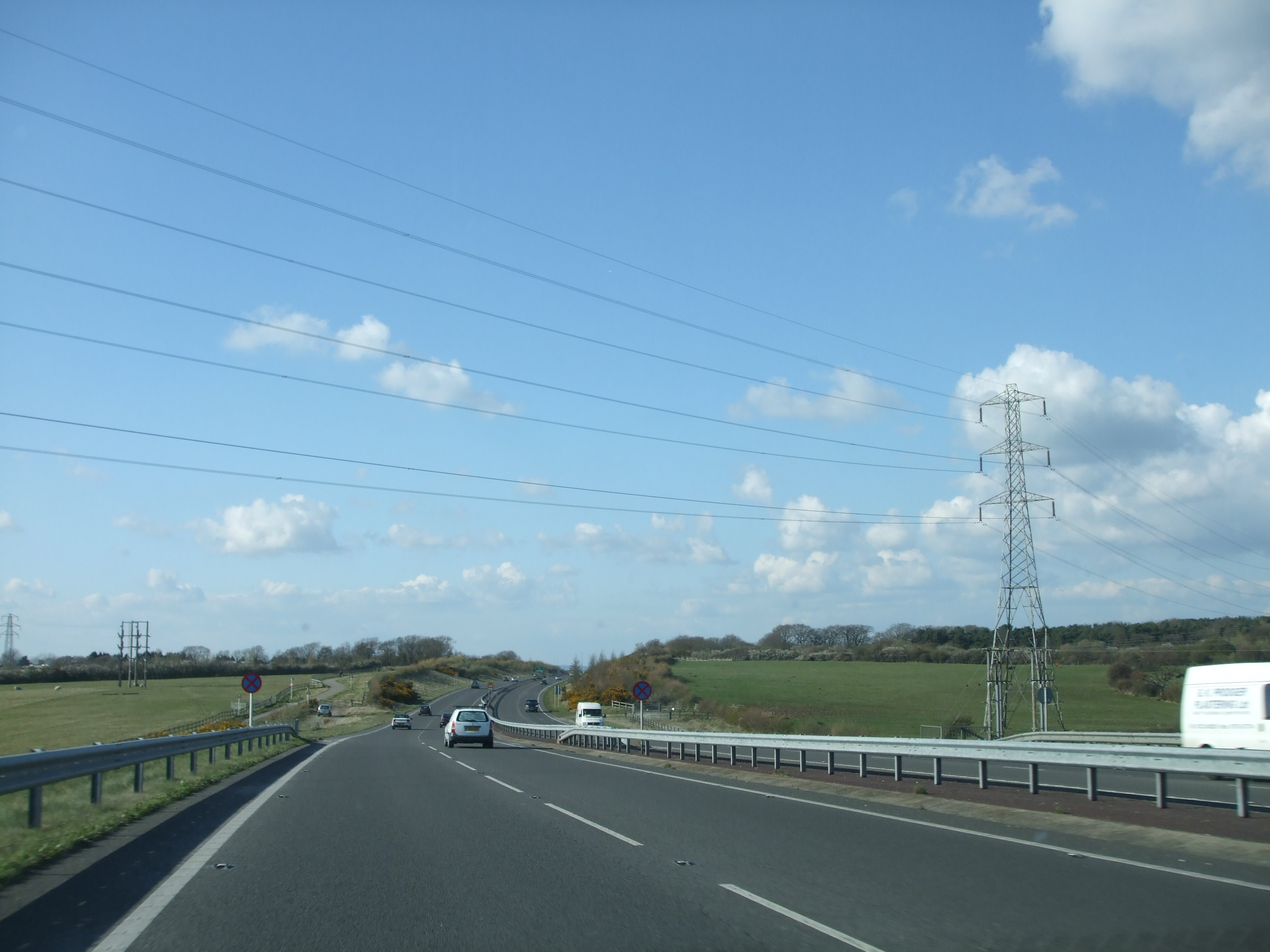
- A22 near Eastbourne in East Sussex.

Route information
- Length: 48.3 mi (77.7 km)

Major junctions
- South end: A2280 / A2290 in Eastbourne; 50.785°N 0.274°E

- A27 near Polegate A26 near Uckfield A272 near Maresfield A264 in East Grinstead M25 in Godstone

- North end: A23 / A235 in London (Purley); 51.3375°N 0.1166°W

Location
- Country: United Kingdom
- Counties: East Sussex, West Sussex, Surrey, Greater London
- Primary destinations: Croydon; East Grinstead

Road network
- Roads in the United Kingdom; Motorways; A and B road zones

The A22 is one of the two-digit major roads in the south east of England. Radial, it carries traffic from London to the Eastbourne area of the East Sussex coast, in which town it ends.

== History ==
=== Turnpikes ===
For part of its route the A22 utilises the turnpikes opened in the 18th century:

- 1718: London to East Grinstead section opened as a turnpike
- 1720: above road extended through East Grinstead to Highgate, Forest Row, the entrance to Ashdown Forest

By 1820 the road ran for 34 miles (54 km) from Stones End Street, Borough, London to Wych Cross.

=== Extension to Westminster Bridge ===
The road was extended north to Westminster Bridge which was later renamed the A23.

== Route ==
The A22 diverges from the A23 south of London at Purley Cross Junction (south of Purley). It runs over the North Downs into Surrey, crossing the M25 London Orbital Motorway just north of Godstone. This section incorporates the Caterham bypass, which opened in 1939 as one of the earliest such roads in the country, including the Wapses Lodge roundabout at the northern end. It then travels along the route of an ancient Roman road.

To the south of the M25, the road briefly enters West Sussex at Felbridge, just to the north of East Grinstead, and the A264 between Crawley and Tunbridge Wells merges with the A22 for a short section. The A22 bypasses East Grinstead town centre, running along a disused railway cutting, part of a line which closed as a consequence of the Beeching Report, which cut large numbers of local rail services. Richard Beeching was a local resident, and as a result, some local residents wanted to call this section the "Beeching Cut". Instead, it was named Beeching Way.

To the south of East Grinstead the A22 crosses into East Sussex, just north of Forest Row. Between Forest Row and Nutley the road crosses the ancient Ashdown Forest. The A22 is the only road through the forest not subject to 40 mph speed limits. The A275 branches south to Lewes at the Wych Cross junction. Both the A272 and the A26 cross the A22 between Nutley and Uckfield. The A26 merges with the A22 for the section round Uckfield. There are bypasses of East Hoathly and Hailsham. There is a junction with the A27, to the north of the end of the A22, in Eastbourne.

== Junction list ==
=== A22 ===
| County | Location | mi | km | Destinations | Notes |
|---|---|---|---|---|---|
| East Sussex | Eastbourne | 0.0 | 0.0 | Lottbridge Drove (A2290 south-east) / Cross Levels Way (A2280 south-west) – Town centre, Hampden Park | Southern terminus; north-western terminus of A2290; north-eastern terminus of A2280 |
| East Sussex | Polegate–Westham boundary | 2.1 | 3.4 | A27 east to A259 – Hastings, Bexhill | Southern terminus of A27 concurrency |
| East Sussex | Polegate | 3.8 | 6.1 | A27 west (Polegate By-Pass) / Hailsham Road (B2247) – Brighton, Newhaven, Lewes, Polegate, Alfriston, Willingdon | Northern terminus of A27 concurrency |
| East Sussex | Arlington–Hailsham boundary | 5.6 | 9.0 | A295 north-east (South Road) – Hailsham | South-western terminus of A295 |
| East Sussex | Hellingly | 7.5 | 12.1 | A267 north / A271 east – Heathfield, Bexhill, Horam, Horsebridge | Southern terminus of A267; western terminus of A271 |
| East Sussex | Little Horsted–Uckfield boundary | 16.0 | 25.7 | A26 south-west / Lewes Road – Lewes, Brighton, Newhaven | Southern terminus of A26 concurrency |
| East Sussex | Maresfield–Uckfield boundary | 18.9 | 30.4 | A26 north-east / A272 east – Crowborough, Tunbridge Wells, Heathfield, Maresfield, Buxted | Northern terminus of A26 concurrency; southern terminus of A272 concurrency |
| East Sussex | Maresfield | 19.6 | 31.5 | A272 west / Batts Bridge Road – Haywards Heath, Maresfield, Newick | Northern terminus of A272 concurrency |
| East Sussex | Wych Cross | 25.7 | 41.4 | A275 south (Lewes Road) – Lewes, Chelwood Gate, Danehill | Northern terminus of A275 |
| West Sussex | East Grinstead | 31.6 | 50.9 | A264 east (Moat Road) – Tunbridge Wells | Southern terminus of A264 concurrency |
| Surrey | Felbridge | 32.8 | 52.8 | A264 west (Copthorne Road) to M23 – Crawley, Gatwick Airport | Northern terminus of A264 concurrency |
| Surrey | Godstone | 40.9 | 65.8 | A25 (Oxted Road) – Westerham, Redhill, Oxted, Godstone | Godstone signed northbound only |
| Surrey | Godstone | 41.7– 41.9 | 67.1– 67.4 | M25 / B2235 (Godstone Hill) to M23 – Gatwick Airport, Reigate, Sevenoaks, Dartford, Godstone | M25 junction 6 |
| Greater London | Purley | 48.0 | 77.2 | A2022 east (Downs Court Road) – Selsdon, Sanderstead | Southern terminus of A2022 concurrency |
| Greater London | 48.3 | 77.7 | A23 / A235 north to M25 – Brighton, Gatwick Airport, Central London, Croydon, South Croydon | Northern terminus; southern terminus of A235 | |
1.000 mi = 1.609 km; 1.000 km = 0.621 mi: Concurrency terminus

== Gallery ==
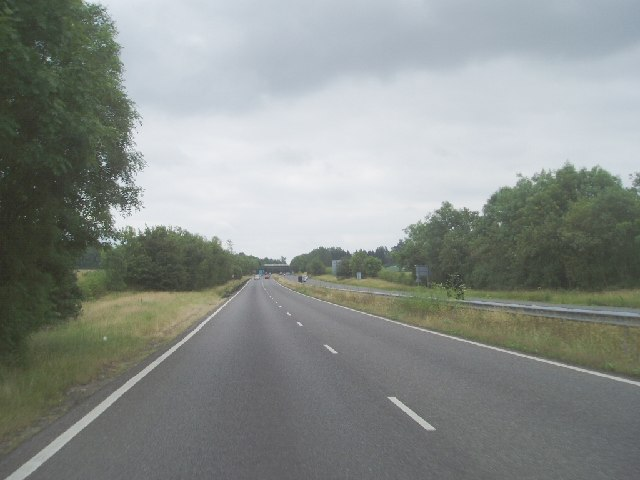
Godstone bypass

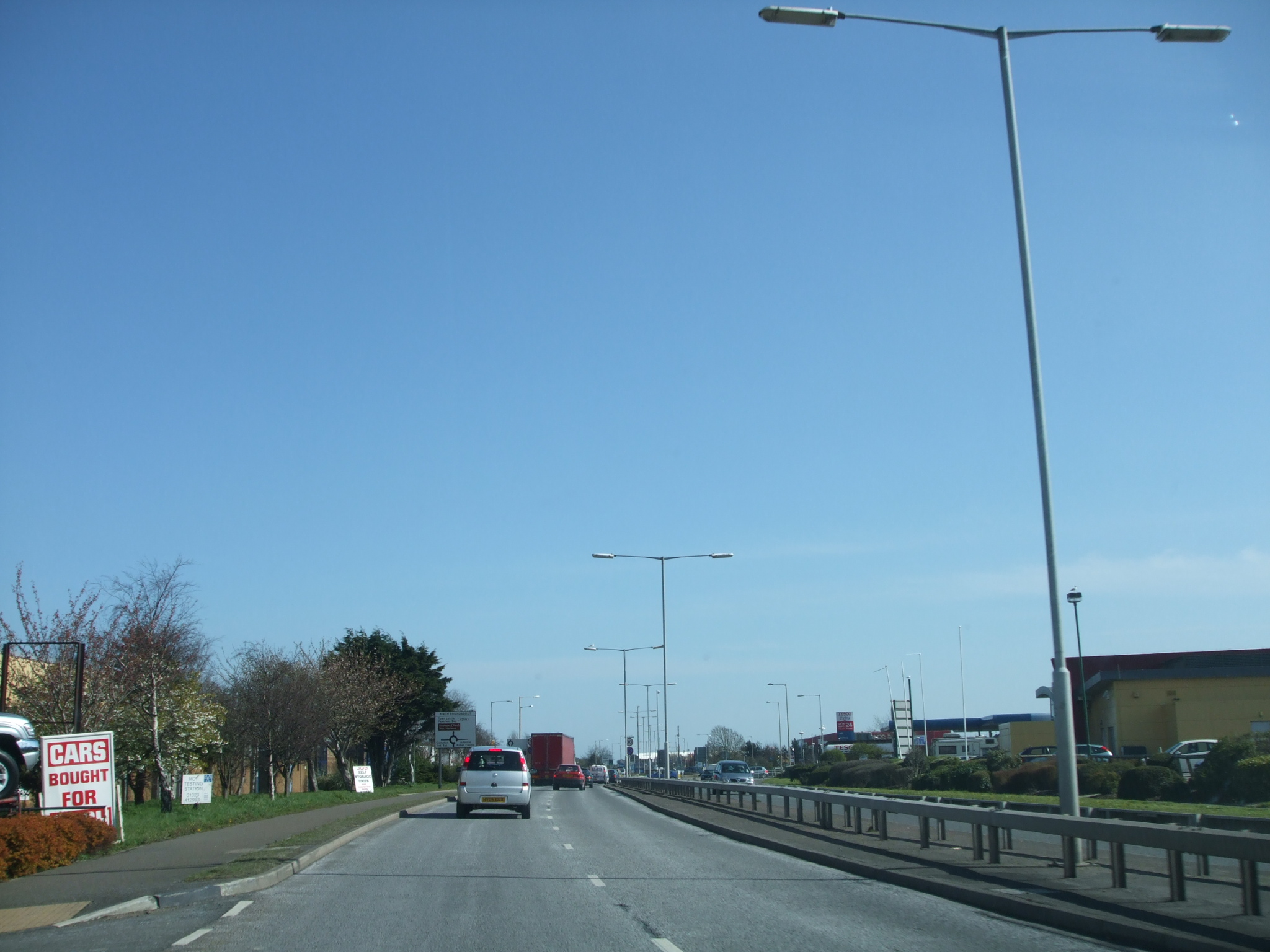
The A22 in Eastbourne.

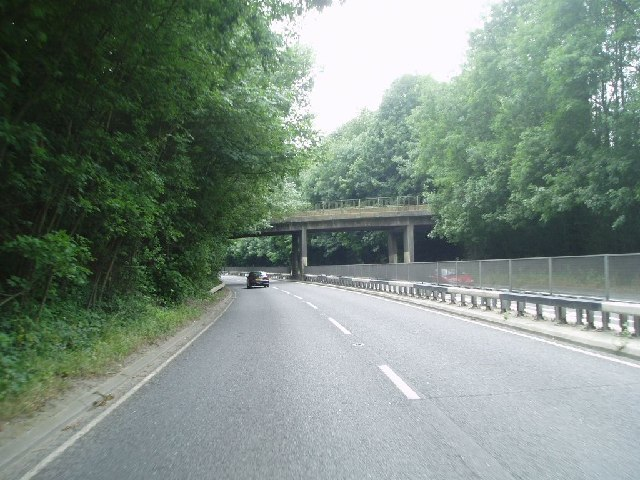
The Caterham Bypass

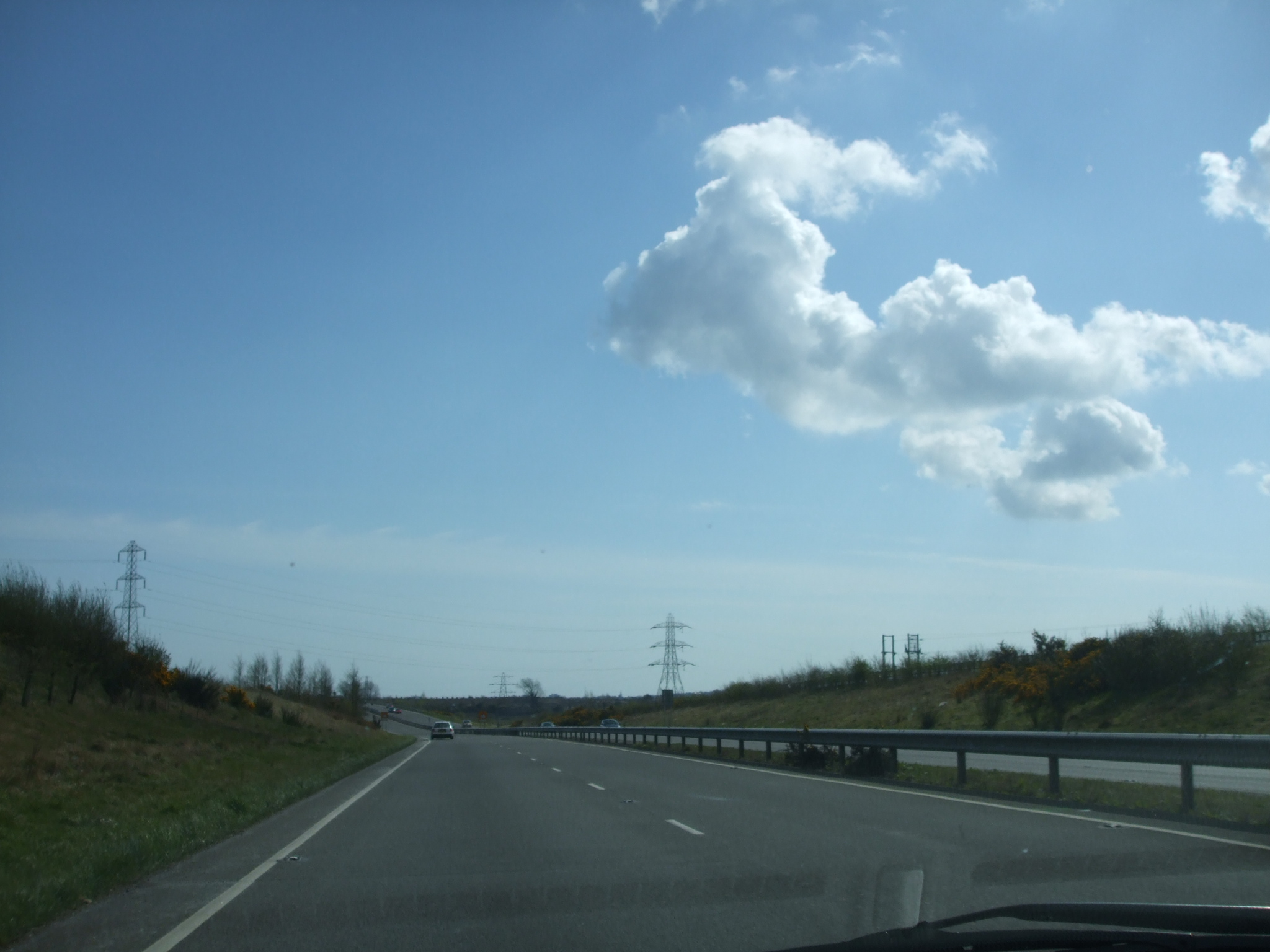
At Polegate

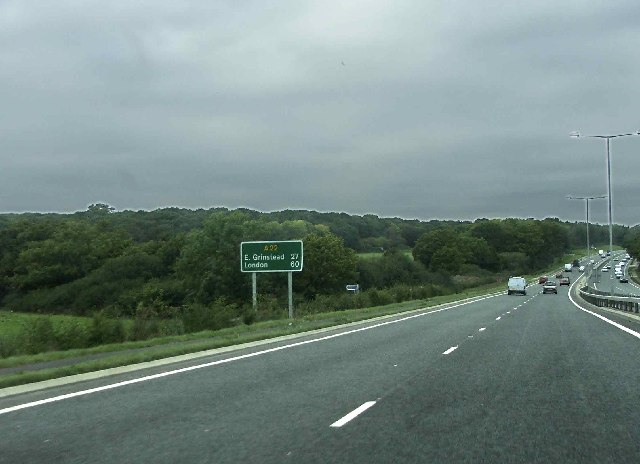
A22 northbound towards Hailsham, East Sussex

== See also ==
- Great Britain road numbering scheme
