= South Lambeth Library =

Public library in the London Borough of Lambeth, England

Coordinates: 51°28′45″N 0°07′26″W

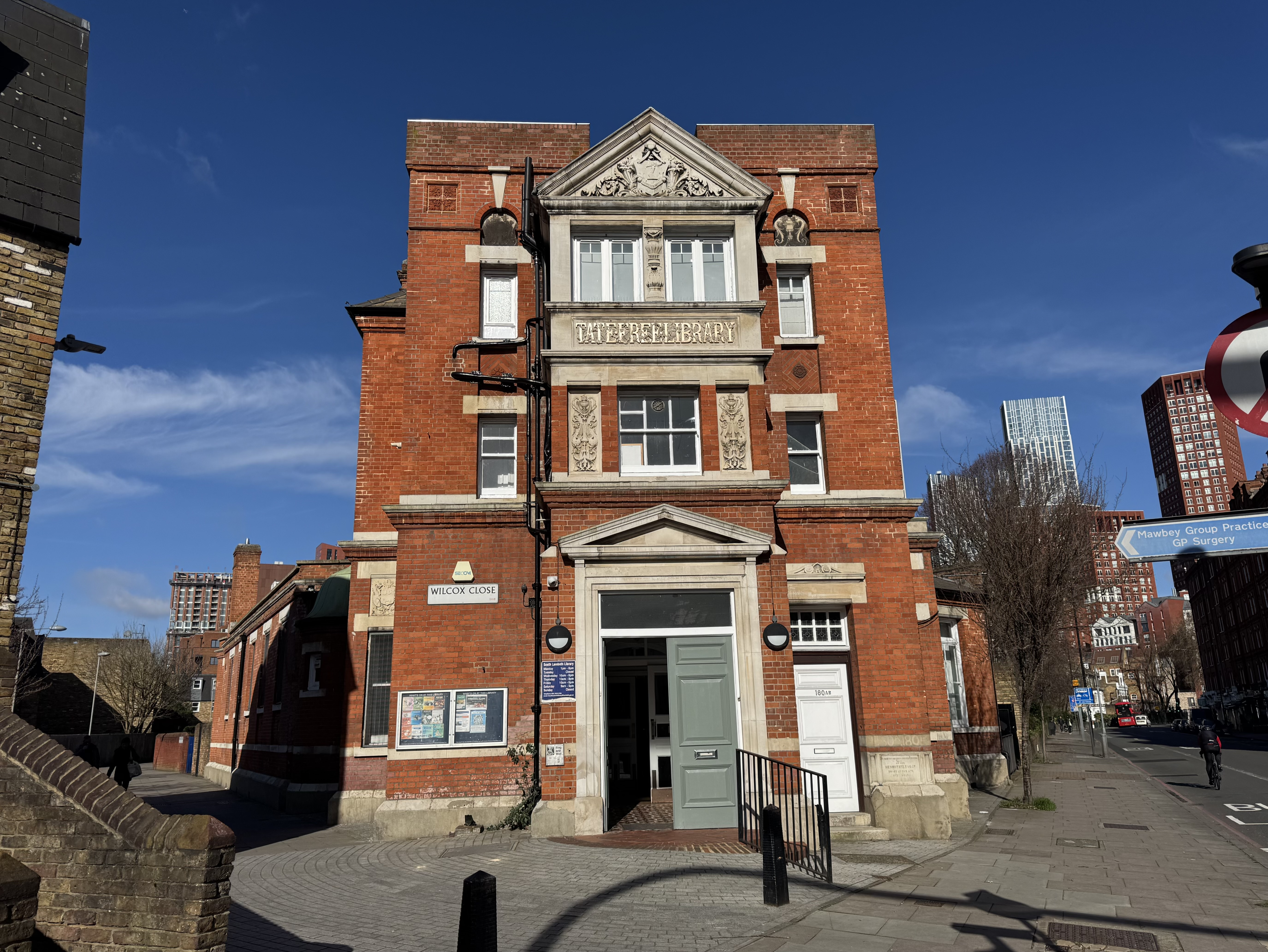
- The library in 2026
- Location: 180 South Lambeth Road, London SW8 1QP, United Kingdom
- Type: Public library
- Established: 1888 (138 years ago)
- Architect: Sidney R. J. Smith
- Branches: 1

Other information
- Website: libraries.lambeth.gov.uk/-/tate-south-lambeth-library

South Lambeth Library also known as The Tate South Lambeth Library is a public library in Little Portugal, London. Opened in 1888 as one of three free libraries endowed by the sugar magnate Henry Tate, it is the borough's oldest public library in continuous use.

The library forms part of the borough's public library network, Lambeth Libraries, and serves a diverse local population including a large Portuguese-speaking community.

== History ==
=== Foundation ===
Tate South Lambeth Library was built as one of three free public libraries in Lambeth funded by the sugar refiner and philanthropist Sir Henry Tate, who also endowed the Tate Gallery and libraries at Brixton and Streatham.

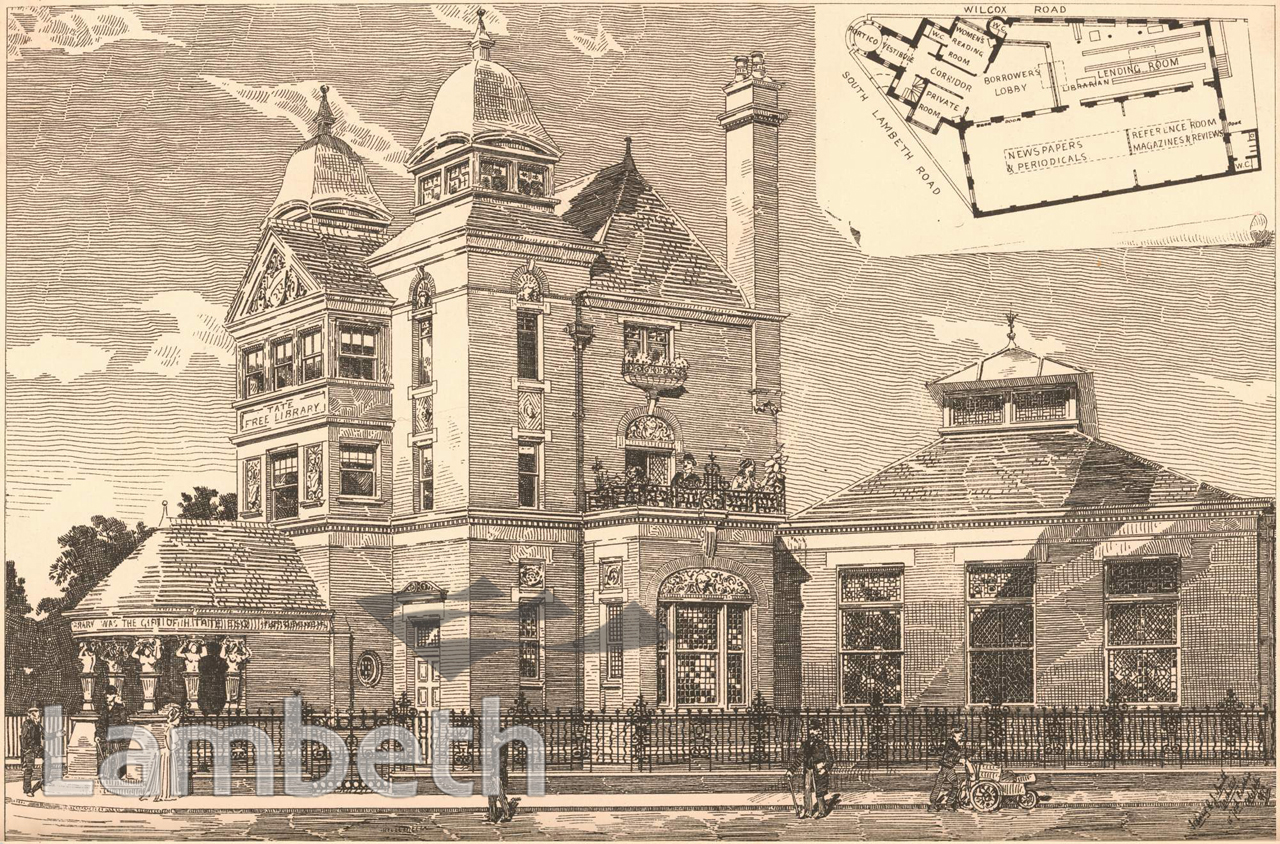
The library in 1887 along with a floor plan on the top-right.

The building was designed by architect Sidney R. J. Smith and erected by contractor B. E. Nightingale at a cost of £6,000. It opened on 1 December 1888, when it was formally inaugurated by the Liberal politician Anthony John Mundella, Member of Parliament. The new library replaced earlier free library provision which had operated from Wheatsheaf Hall and later from premises at 69 South Lambeth Road, bringing a collection of around 6,000 volumes into purpose-built accommodation. The library originally contained a newspaper and periodical room, reference room, lending library and a separate women's reading room.

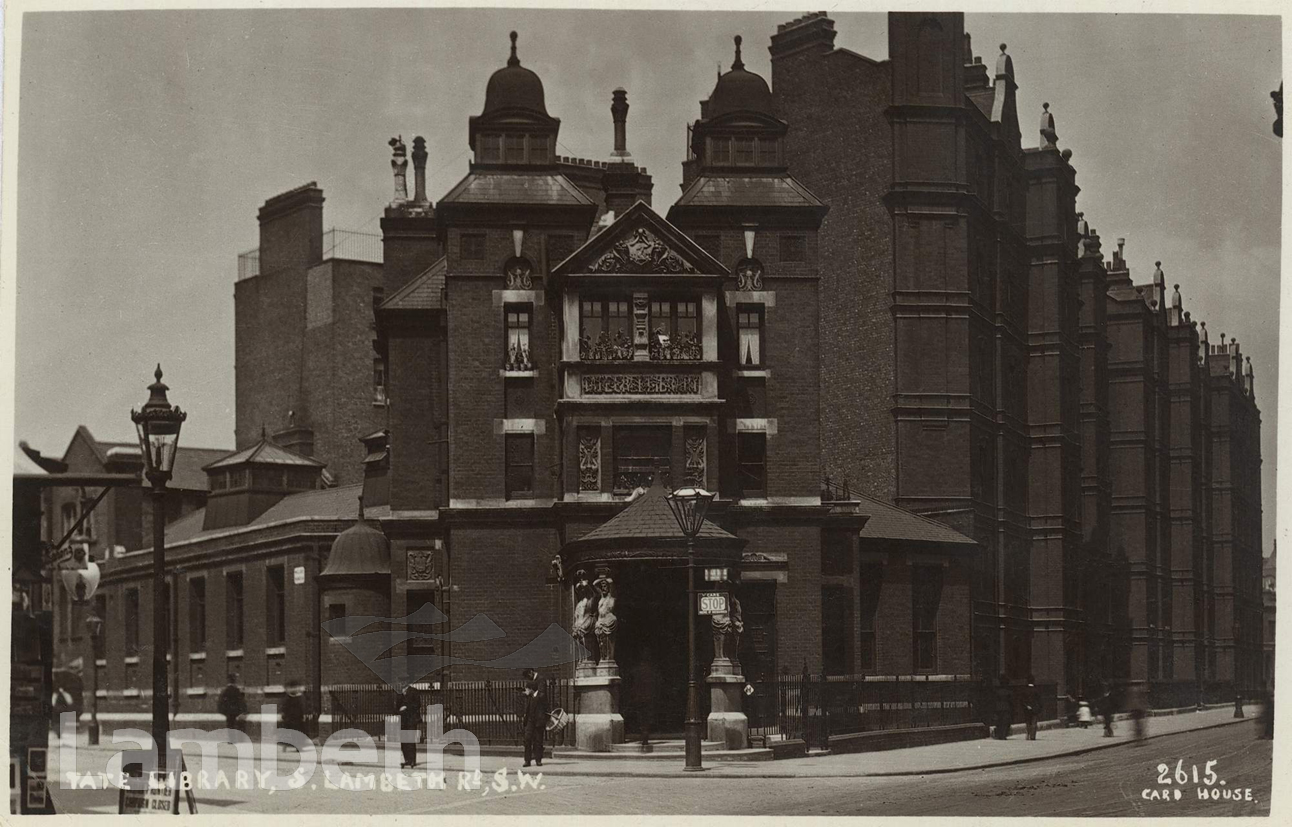
Postcard with the Tate South Lambeth Library in front from 1910.

=== Twentieth century ===
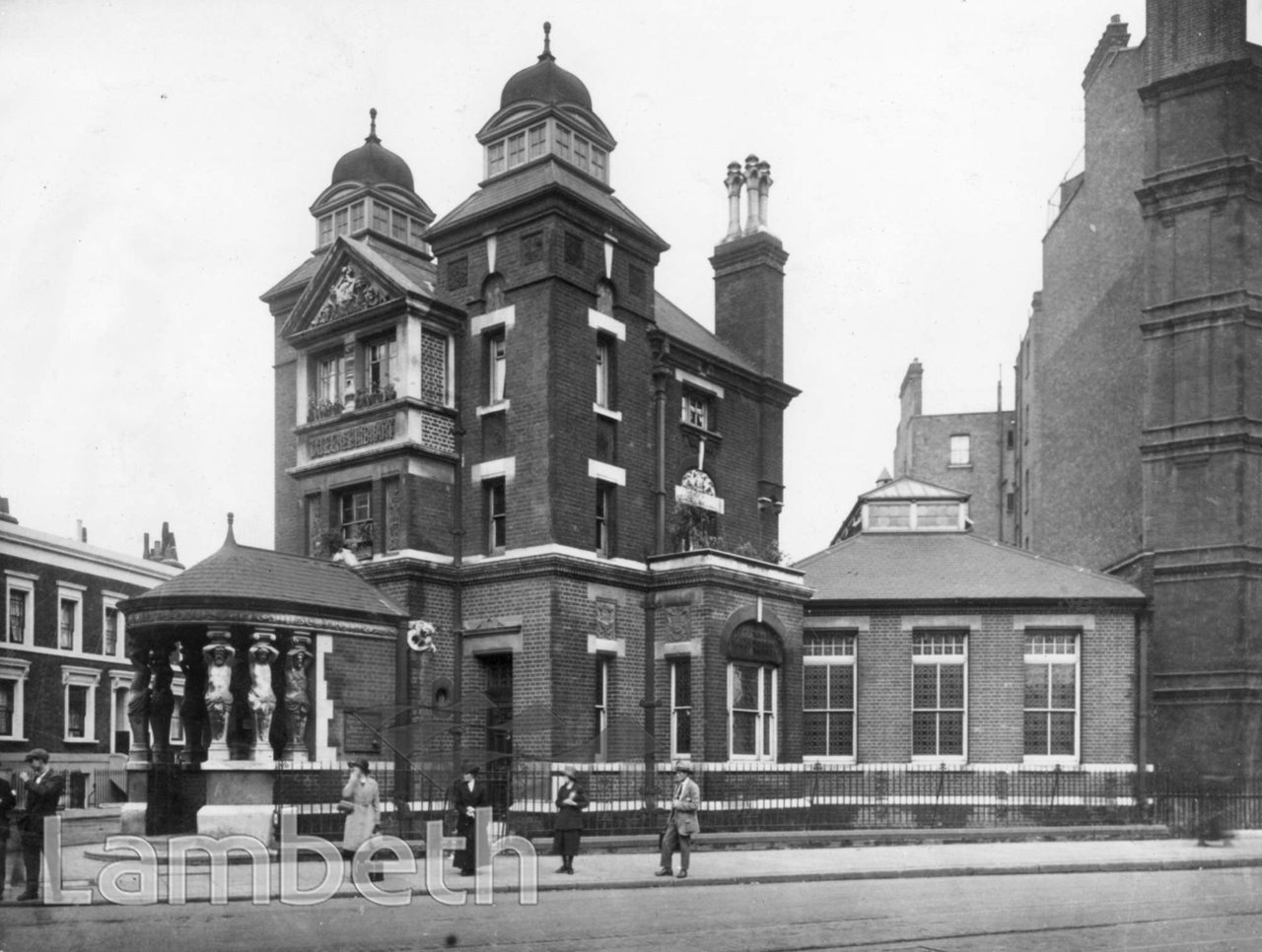
The library circa 1930s.

From the outset the library served the surrounding working-class districts of Vauxhall, Stockwell and Nine Elms. According to later accounts, the exterior and interior were originally more elaborate, with copper cupolas on the street-facing towers and a circular porch carried on caryatids; these features were removed during the mid-twentieth century, and the upper floors were later converted to housing for the borough's housing department.

Despite its proximity to the railway yards at Nine Elms, the building survived bomb damage in the Second World War and continued to function as a local library thereafter.

In the 1970s Lambeth Council considered demolishing the library when nearby mansion blocks were cleared to build the Mawbey Brough estate, but the building was retained.

=== Campaigns and consultations ===
In 1999 Lambeth Council proposed rationalising its twelve libraries into five "centres of excellence". Tate South Lambeth Library was among the branches identified for possible closure. In response, local residents formed the Friends of Tate South Lambeth Library to campaign for its retention; the group successfully opposed the proposals and the library remained open.

Further proposals to reduce or repurpose the library were brought forward in the mid-2010s as part of Lambeth's "Culture 2020" strategy, which envisaged a network of larger town-centre libraries supplemented by smaller "book-drop" facilities. One option consulted on between late 2015 and early 2016 was to convert Tate South Lambeth into a "healthy living centre" with a much smaller library offer, while neighbouring Durning Library in Kennington would become the interim town-centre library for north Lambeth.

The Friends group coordinated a high-profile campaign encouraging local residents to respond to the consultation and to oppose the downgrading of the library. The consultation report recorded that a large majority of respondents who commented on Tate South Lambeth wanted it to remain a full-service library, and that many opposed replacing library space with gym or health facilities.

During this period, the library attracted wider media attention. Local and national figures, including actress Joanna Lumley and the area's Member of Parliament, Kate Hoey, expressed support for campaigns against library cuts in Lambeth, highlighting the role of Tate South Lambeth Library in the local community and in providing English-language classes for Portuguese speakers.

Following the consultation and campaigns, Lambeth Council confirmed that Tate South Lambeth would remain open as a library, although at times operating with a reduced service, rather than being transferred to an external leisure operator.

=== Twenty-first-century refurbishment ===
In 2025 Lambeth Council carried out a major refurbishment of the building, investing around £360,000 to restore Victorian architectural features, improve accessibility and reconfigure internal spaces. Works included repairs to stone and brickwork, upgrades to drainage, the creation of a new children's area and meeting space, new shelving and furniture, and improved accessible toilets. The project complemented earlier environmental improvements, including the installation of an air source heat pump.

The refurbished library was officially reopened in September 2025 by the leader of Lambeth Council, Claire Holland, at a ceremony attended by pupils from a nearby primary school.

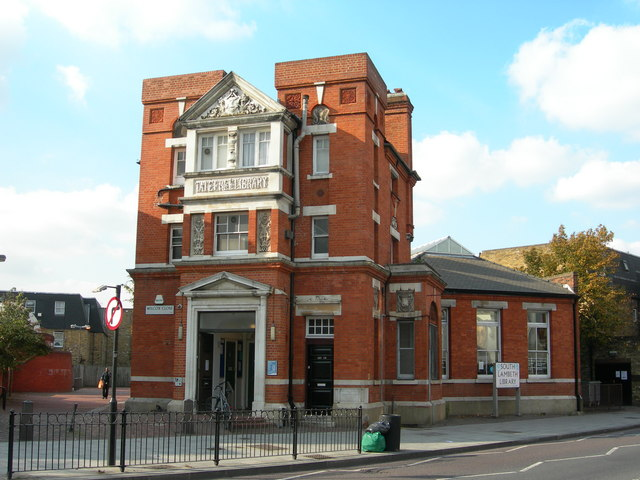
The library in 2007.

== Building ==
The library occupies a prominent corner site at 180 South Lambeth Road. It is a red-brick, late-Victorian structure in a loosely classical style, with a symmetrical street frontage, stone dressings and a central entrance bay. Contemporary descriptions and later local histories note that architect Sidney R. J. Smith originally designed the building with copper cupolas and a round entrance porch supported by caryatids, though these features were later removed.

Internally, the library has been altered over time to reflect changing patterns of use and to improve accessibility. The ground floor contains the main lending areas, children's library and study space, while the former external yard has been converted into a small patio garden used for events and activities.

== Services ==
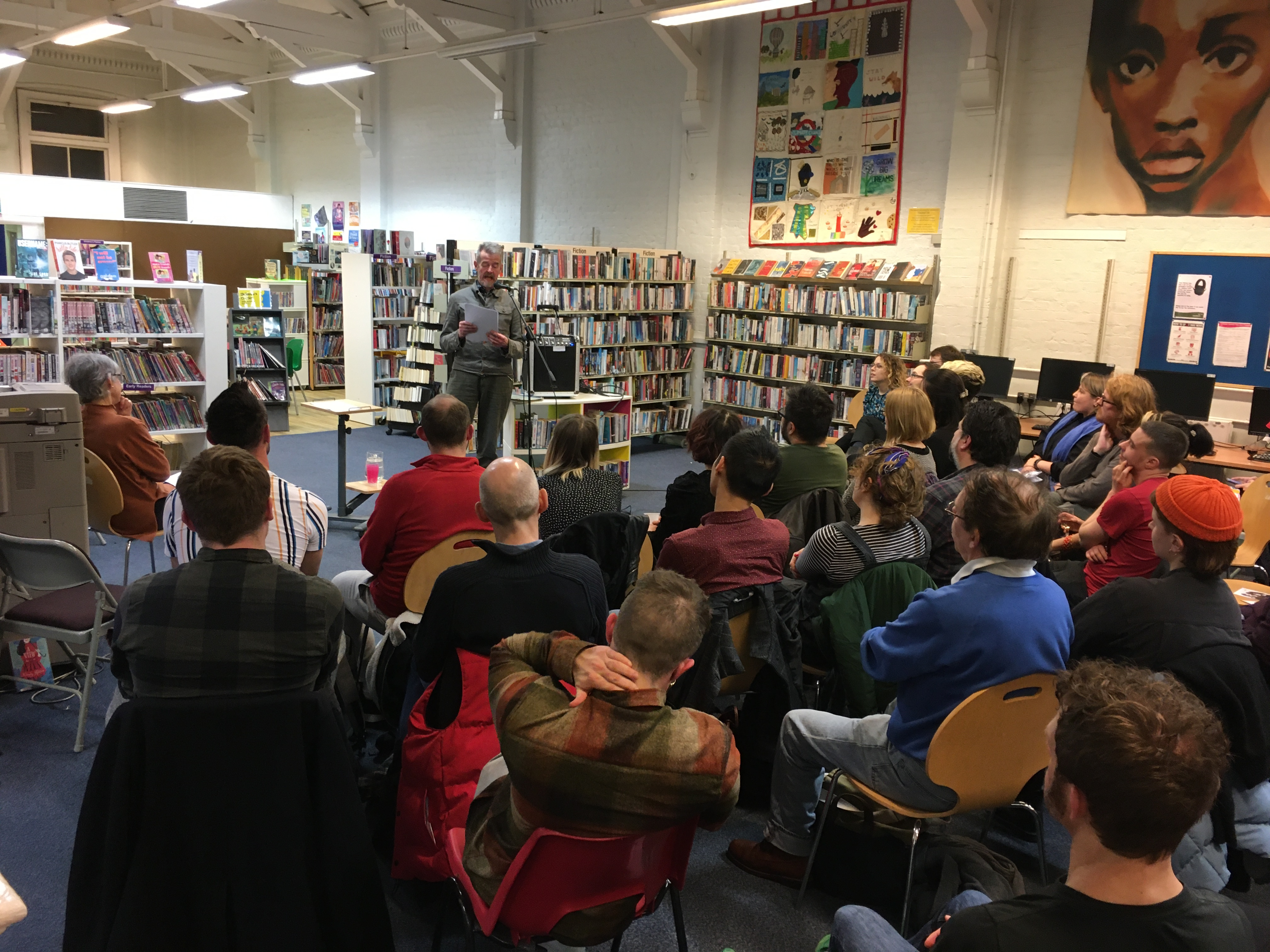
LGBTQ+ book reading at the Tate South Lambeth Library.

Tate South Lambeth Library is part of the Lambeth Libraries service. As of 2025, it offers book lending for adults and children, including large-print and audio books, materials in community languages and access to digital resources such as e-books, e-audio and online reference services.

Facilities include public computers with office software, free Wi-Fi, printing and photocopying, and assistive technologies such as screen magnification and reading software, together with an "Eye Pal Solo" scanner for blind and visually-impaired users. The library is an AccessAble-listed venue, and its entrance incorporates ramped access and hearing assistance at the enquiries desk.

Programming includes regular baby rhyme-time and under-fives storytelling sessions, adult reading groups, chess clubs for adults and children, and various craft, film and cultural events organised by staff and the Friends group. The library has also hosted English-language classes for Portuguese speakers and specialist sessions for visually-impaired users.

Alongside standard library services, Tate South Lambeth participates in borough-wide initiatives such as the "Safe Haven" scheme, providing a temporary refuge for people who feel unsafe or are experiencing harassment, and schemes to provide free sanitary and hygiene products to residents. Lambeth Libraries additionally promotes a scheme under which borrowers can borrow a ukulele free of charge from the branch.

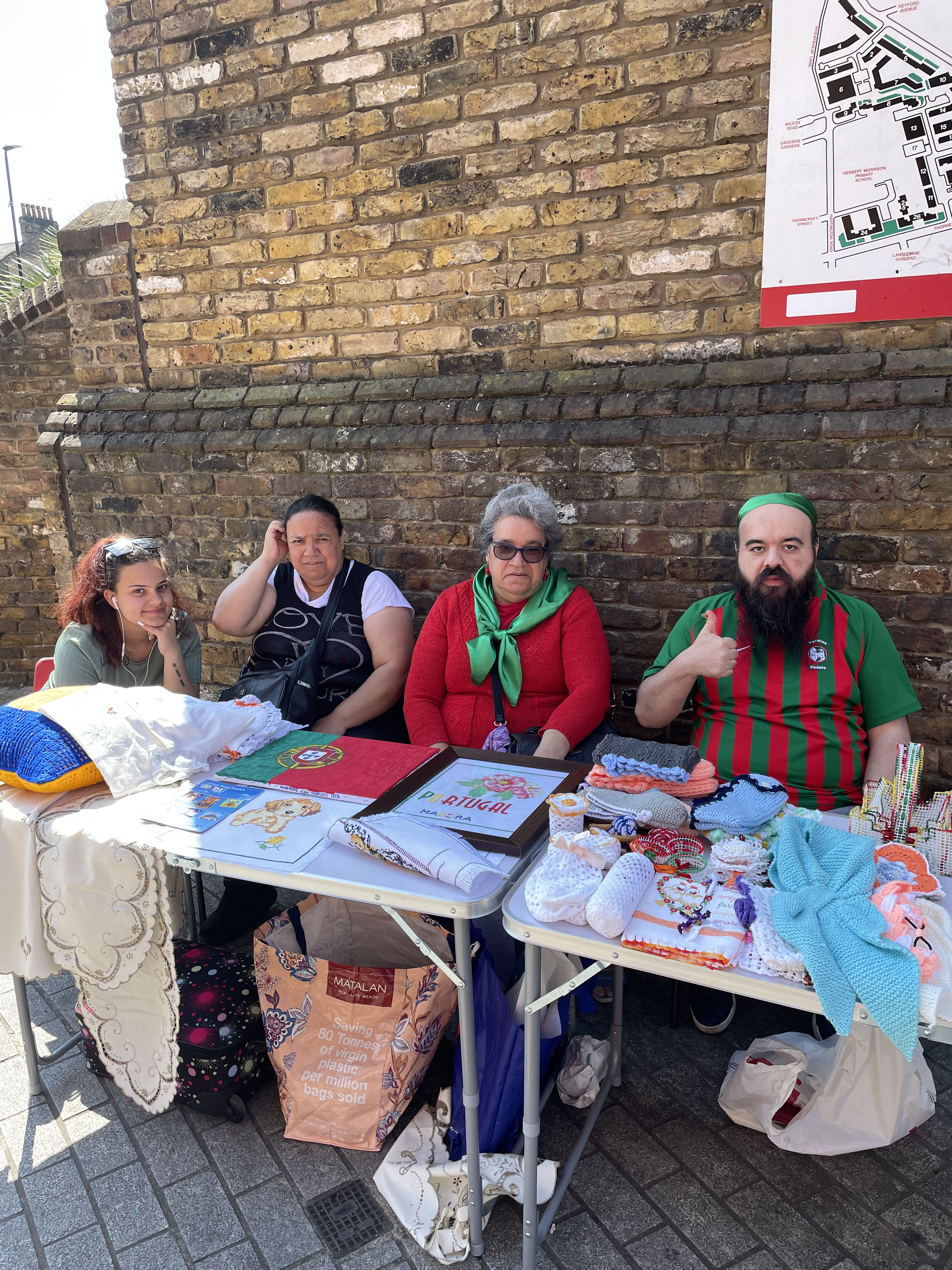
Portuguese-speaking community outside the Tate South Lambeth Library, celebrating Portugal Day.

== Community ==
The library serves an area with a significant Portuguese-speaking population, and Lambeth Council describes it as being located "in the heart of Lambeth’s Portuguese community", between Stockwell, Vauxhall and Nine Elms. The Friends of Tate South Lambeth Library, established in 1999, continues to organise events such as book sales, talks, concerts, art displays and gardening sessions, as well as supporting English-language classes and other activities run by library staff.

Campaigns around Tate South Lambeth Library in the 1990s and 2010s have been cited by activists and trade unions as examples of community mobilisation to protect local library services in the face of funding reductions and restructuring proposals.

== See also ==
- Brixton Tate Library
- Durning Library
- Streatham Library
- Henry Tate
