= Little Portugal, London =

Portuguese community area in London

Coordinates: 51°28′27″N 0°07′21″W

Little Portugal
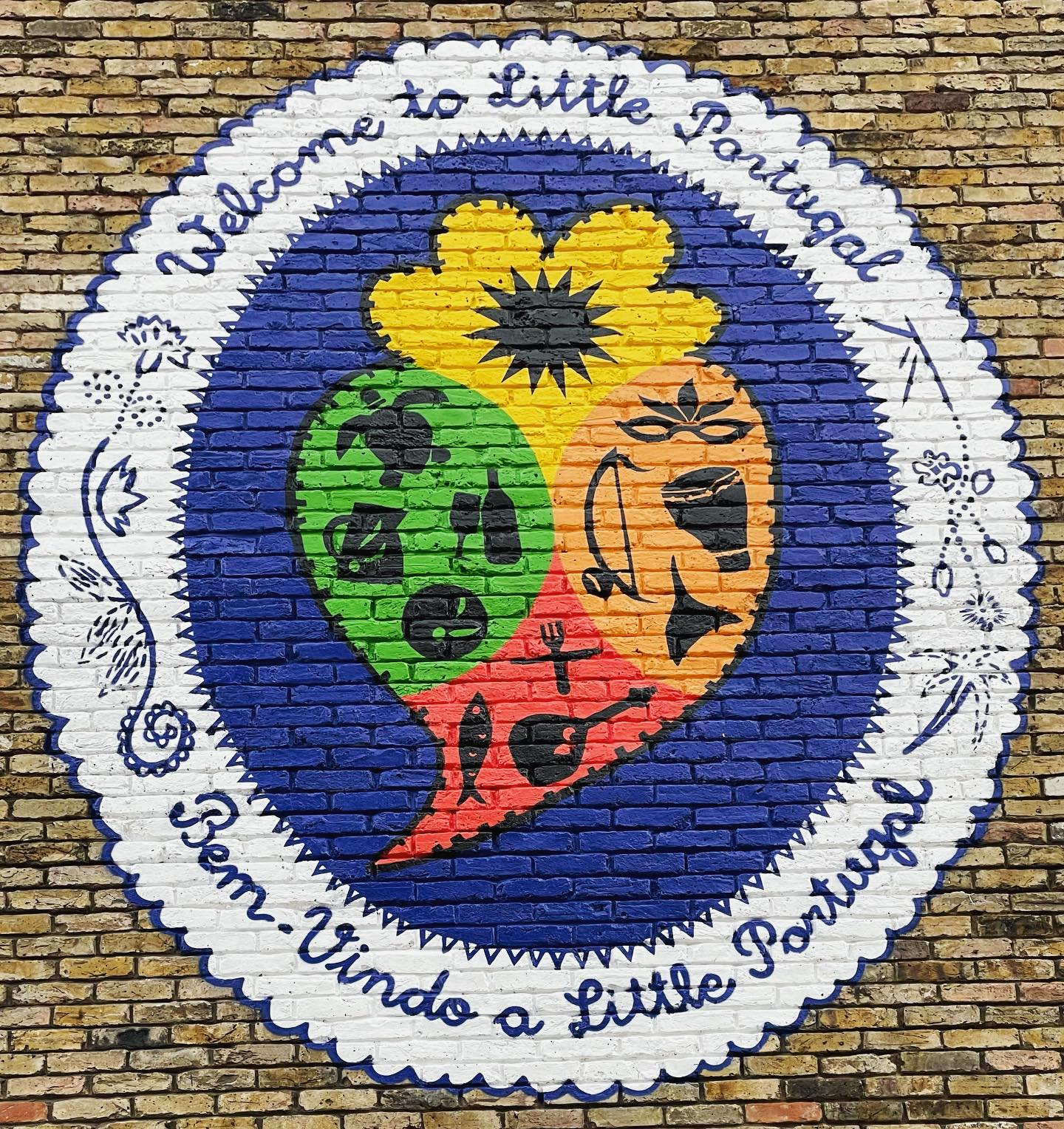
- The Little Portugal mural, opposite South Lambeth Library

- Location within Greater London
- Little Portugal shown within Lambeth
- London borough: Lambeth
- Ceremonial county: Greater London
- Region: London
- Country: England
- Sovereign state: United Kingdom
- Police: Metropolitan
- Fire: London
- Ambulance: London
- London Assembly: Lambeth and Southwark

Little Portugal is an informal name for the Portuguese-speaking area centred on South Lambeth Road in the London Borough of Lambeth, South London. It lies between Vauxhall to the north, Nine Elms to the west, Stockwell to the south, Brixton further south, and Oval to the east. South Lambeth Road and the streets adjoining it contain a concentration of Portuguese cafés, bars, restaurants, delicatessens and other businesses serving the local community.

According to Lambeth's 2030 Borough Plan and the 2021 United Kingdom census, 9,009 residents of the borough recorded Portuguese as their main language, the highest number of any London borough and the second most commonly recorded main language in Lambeth after English.

A 2015 scoping study estimated between 30,000 and 35,000 Portuguese speakers in the borough, and noted an increasing number moving southwards to areas such as Tulse Hill and West Norwood. Press estimates of the borough's Portuguese-speaking population have ranged from about 30,000 to 40,000, rising to 80,000 where people of Portuguese descent are also counted.

== Name and extent ==
The name is a nickname rather than an official designation, and is applied to the stretch of South Lambeth Road between Vauxhall and Stockwell together with the adjoining streets, in particular Wilcox Road and the railway arches nearby. Lambeth Council uses the term in its own publications and in the naming of regeneration and cultural programmes.

== History ==
Portuguese migration to London increased from the 1960s onwards, when emigrants left an authoritarian Estado Novo regime in search of employment, commonly finding work in construction, cleaning and catering. Many families first settled around Golborne Road in Notting Hill and other parts of Ladbroke Grove. Rising rents and the gentrification of west London subsequently prompted a move south of the River Thames, and above all to Stockwell and South Lambeth, where the community became established.

The concentration of Portuguese households in the area was reinforced by the allocation of social housing to Portuguese migrants, who subsequently passed tenancies to relatives; this contributed to the clustering of the community in the area from the early 1990s. Accounts published in the Portuguese press describe the area as having been built up over more than fifty years by families arriving principally in the 1960s and 1970s.

The commercial character of the area developed over the 1980s and 1990s as restaurants, hairdressers and delicatessens opened along South Lambeth Road.

The 2016 referendum on European Union membership and its aftermath attracted considerable attention to the area. Reporting at the time recorded that some residents were uncertain about their residence status and referred to an increase in recorded hate crime, while others said they expected to remain in the United Kingdom.

== Demography ==
Shops and restaurants in South Lambeth Road, in 2007

According to the 2021 United Kingdom census, 2.2% of Lambeth's population was born in Portugal, including Madeira and the Azores, and 2.5% recorded a Portuguese national identity. A large proportion of the Portuguese-speaking community traces its origins to Madeira, and to towns in Continental Portugal such as Mangualde.

The area also has Portuguese African and Brazilian populations, and Portuguese-speaking residents of other nationalities, so that the term Little Portugal is commonly understood to denote a Lusophone rather than a strictly Portuguese community.

Lambeth as a whole attracts working-age migrants from the United Kingdom and abroad, and the Portuguese-speaking community has been described as an unusually entrepreneurial one within the borough.

== Economy ==
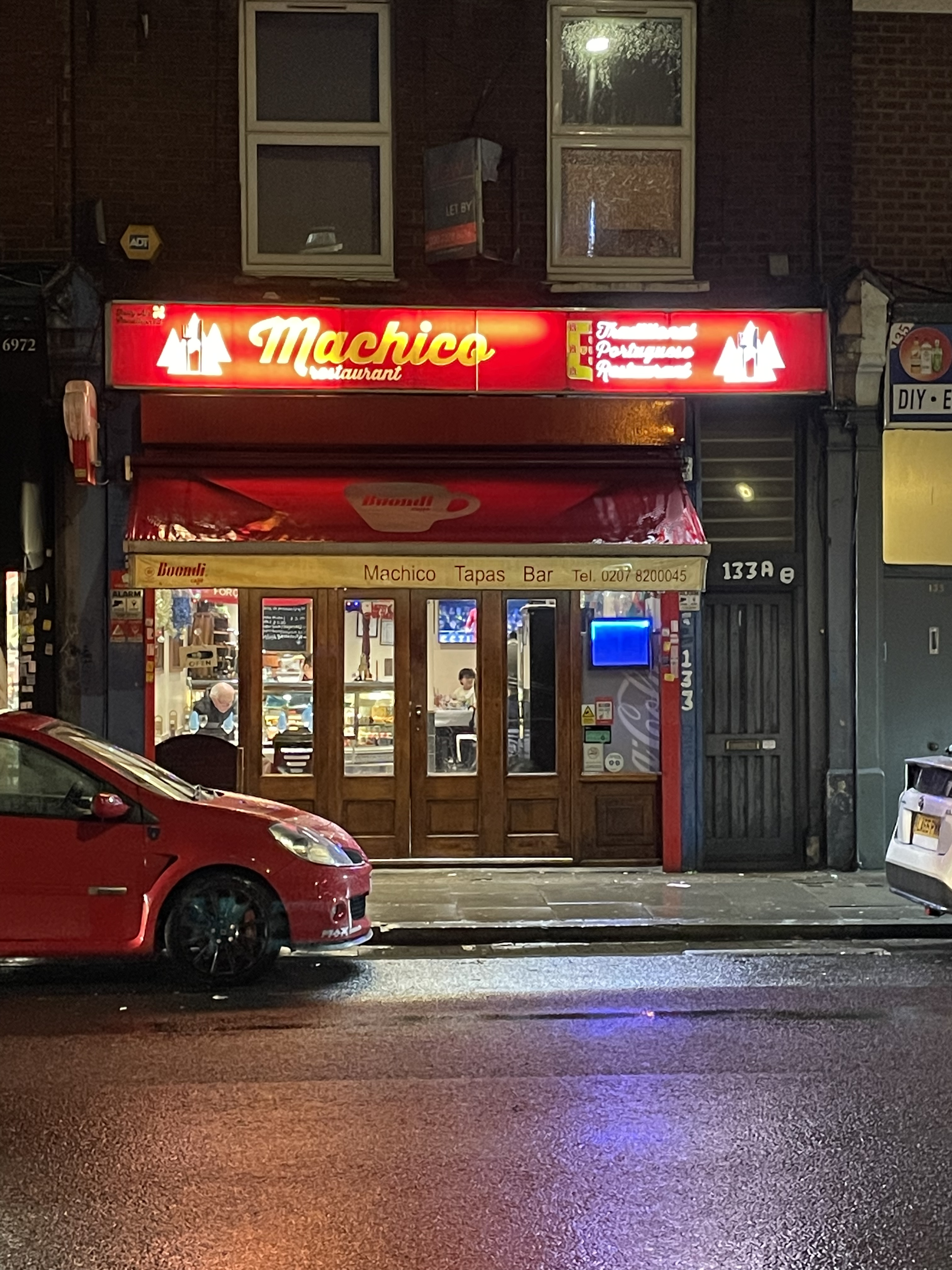
Night view of a bar restaurant on South Lambeth Road in Little Portugal, in 2023

South Lambeth Road and its side streets contain more than a dozen Portuguese businesses, among them restaurants, cafés, bakeries, grocers and delicatessens. The area is known in particular for the pastel de nata.

The area has been listed among London neighbourhoods notable for their international cuisine.

== Community and culture ==
=== South Lambeth Library ===
South Lambeth Library, at 180 South Lambeth Road, serves as a focal point for the community. It holds a Portuguese-language collection and hosts English classes, children's storytelling in Portuguese and other cultural activities.

In April 2024, the library hosted Viva o 25 de Abril de 1974, an exhibition marking the fiftieth anniversary of the fall of the Portuguese dictatorship. The exhibition was researched and designed by members of the group Migrantes Unidos with the assistance of the retired graphic designer Bill Mayblin, and was curated by Alvaro de Miranda. Proposals for a dedicated Portuguese cultural centre in London have also been discussed.

=== Portugal Day and street markets ===
In June 2016, a volunteer-run Portuguese street market was held in the roads around South Lambeth Library to mark Portugal Day, with the stated aim of creating a community hub and becoming a monthly event if successful.

Portugal Day has since been marked in the area on a recurring basis, and visits by Portuguese public figures have attracted coverage in the Portuguese media. On 13 June 2026, Lambeth Council, the Lambeth Portuguese Wellbeing Partnership and businesses on Wilcox Road held a celebration for Portugal Day, funded through the UK Shared Prosperity Fund and Section 106 contributions. The event featured performances from eight Portuguese-speaking countries, arts workshops, children's activities and food from local businesses; the council reported that more than 90 per cent of attendees said the event made them feel positive about the area.

The area has also been a focus for community responses to events in Portugal and the United Kingdom, including the death of Queen Elizabeth II in 2022, and earlier proposals for the area to act as a host base for Portuguese athletes during the 2012 Summer Olympics.

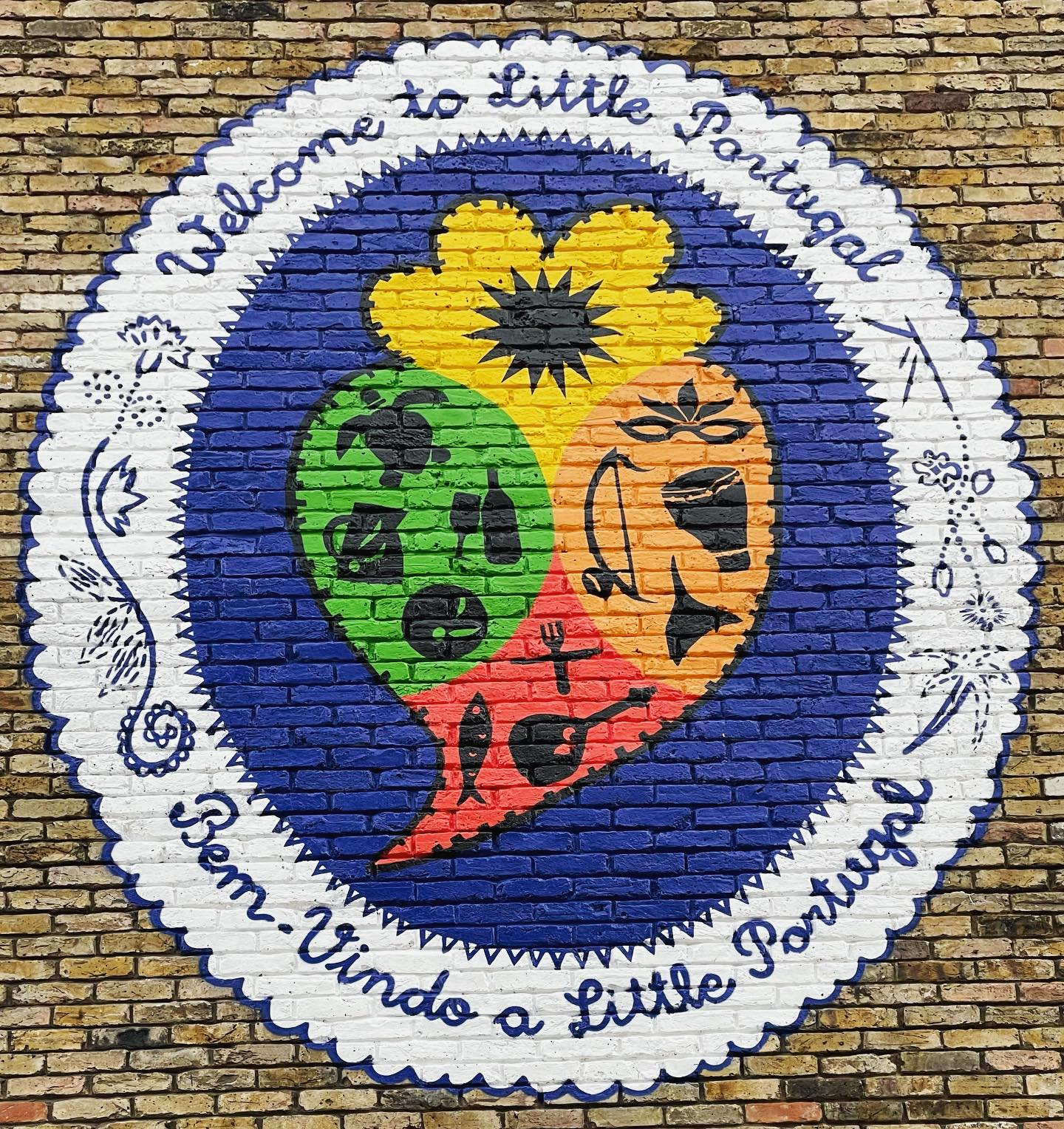
Little Portugal mural, located opposite the South Lambeth Library, in 2023

=== Little Portugal mural ===
In 2023, Lambeth Council and the Mayor of London funded a mural celebrating Little Portugal, painted by Eduarda Craveiro and Alex Bowie in partnership with The Brixton Project. It was unveiled on 29 November 2023 on the wall of a residential building beside South Lambeth Library.

The mural measures approximately four metres high by three metres wide. Its central element is a Coração de Viana (Heart of Viana), a traditional filigree jewellery motif, rendered in the colours of the flags of the Portuguese-speaking countries. Within the heart are silhouettes of symbolic objects, among them a fado guitar, a sardine, a berimbau, a carnival mask, a bottle and glass of wine, a Madeiran hat and a Goan turtle. A sun appears at the top and a blue ground represents the sea, while flowers associated with different Lusophone countries, including carnations and lotus flowers, surround the design. The words of welcome to Little Portugal appear in both Portuguese and English.

The unveiling was attended by Amy Lamé, then night czar, on behalf of the Mayor of London, by the Portuguese Consul, by the then Leader of the Council, Councillor Claire Holland, and by the local Portuguese-speaking councillor for Oval ward, Diogo Costa. In her remarks, Holland described the mural as a tribute to the community's contribution and a means of recognising the identity of the area.

=== Media and community organisations ===
Little Portugal is also the name of an independent multimedia platform launched at the end of 2016 by Catarina Demony and Ana Có, which publishes video interviews with Portuguese speakers living and working in London. The project was created partly in response to the outcome of the European Union referendum, and aims to document the range of the community's experience rather than a single stereotype of Portuguese emigration.

Local health and welfare provision for Portuguese speakers has been organised through the Lambeth Portuguese Wellbeing Partnership, formerly the Lambeth Portuguese Community Wellbeing Society Partnership, which works with the council on community projects and events.

== Education ==
Several schools in the area have a high proportion of Portuguese-speaking pupils, among them Wyvil Primary School, where the figure approaches 25 per cent and Portuguese is taught as the modern foreign language, as well as St Stephen's Church of England Primary School and Stockwell Primary School. Proposals for an Anglo-Portuguese bilingual school in London were reported in 2016.

== Regeneration and pressures on the community ==
Banners in the Little Portugal area of Lambeth, in 2026

The area adjoins the Nine Elms regeneration area, one of the largest development zones in Europe, and has been affected by the construction of the United States Embassy, Nine Elms tube station and substantial new residential and student accommodation.

Reporting from 2016 onwards has recorded concern among traders and residents that rising rents and property prices may displace the community, with some suggesting that Portuguese speakers would move to more affordable areas such as Croydon and Norwood rather than return to Portugal; others have argued that increased footfall from new residents would benefit local businesses.

== Local government investment ==
In 2025, the NOOMA Studio project Shine a Light on Wilcox Road installed a co-designed mural, banners and an illuminated gateway sign intended to strengthen the connection between South Lambeth Road and Nine Elms Underground station, and to support local businesses.

In March 2026, Lambeth Council announced further investment in the area as part of the Lambeth Growth Plan, including placemaking initiatives to be developed in consultation with local businesses and residents, alongside the Portugal Day celebration held that June.

== Electoral history ==
=== Parliamentary elections ===
Prior to the 2023 review of Westminster constituencies, the Vauxhall constituency covered the entirety of Little Portugal. Since the 2024 general election, the area has been divided between the Vauxhall and Camberwell Green and Clapham and Brixton Hill constituencies.

Florence Eshalomi is the Member of Parliament for Vauxhall and Camberwell Green and sits on the All-Party Parliamentary Group on Portugal. Bell Ribeiro-Addy is the Member of Parliament for Clapham and Brixton Hill.

=== Local elections ===
==== Prior to 2022 ====
Little Portugal spans several local electoral boundaries. Prior to the boundary changes of 2022 made by the Local Government Boundary Commission for England, the following wards were considered to form part of the area:

- Prince's
- Oval
- Stockwell
- Larkhall

==== Post-2022 ====
Under the changes made by the Local Government Boundary Commission for England for the 2022 Lambeth London Borough Council election, the wards forming part of Little Portugal are:

- Kennington
- Vauxhall
- Oval
- Stockwell East
- Stockwell West and Larkhall

==== Portuguese-speaking councillors ====
The first known Portuguese-speaking candidate to stand for election to Lambeth Council was Gabriel Fernandes, who was elected for the Liberal Democrats in Stockwell ward in 2002. A by-election followed in 2003 after his resignation amid allegations of benefit fraud, at which his party lost the seat to Labour.

In 2010, Fernanda Correia-Sefzick, a Portuguese speaker, stood unsuccessfully for the Liberal Democrats in Stockwell.

In 2014, there were three Portuguese-speaking candidates in Stockwell: Guilherme Rosa for Labour, Correia-Sefzick again for the Liberal Democrats, and Joana Santos for the Trade Unionist and Socialist Coalition. Rosa won the seat, becoming the second known Portuguese-speaking councillor elected in the borough. Originally from Tomar, he served a year as deputy mayor and stood down in May 2018; on leaving office he said he was satisfied with the work undertaken but frustrated by a lack of support from both the council and the community, while praising the community's entrepreneurialism.

In the 2022 elections, the Labour candidate Diogo Costa was elected in Oval, becoming the third Portuguese-speaking councillor elected to Lambeth Council. Costa, who was born in Lambeth to parents from Mangualde, was the youngest councillor elected at that election, aged 23. He has been described in the Portuguese media as the first person of Portuguese descent to be elected a councillor in England. At the 2026 local elections, Costa stood for re-election in Oval for Labour, while Pedro Xavier, born in Bragança stood for the Liberal Democrats in the same ward.

Portuguese political parties have also campaigned among the community in London; in 2022 the leader of Chega reported a strong reception from Portuguese citizens abroad during a visit that included the area.

== See also ==
- Brixton
- Portuguese in the United Kingdom
- South Lambeth Library
- Stockwell
