= Little Portugal =

Little Portugal may refer to:

- Little Portugal, London, England
- Little Portugal, Montreal, Canada
- Little Portugal, San Jose, California, U.S.
- Little Portugal, Toronto, Canada

== See also ==
- Portugal
- Portuguese people
- Portuguese-American neighborhoods
- Fall River, Massachusetts, U.S., with the largest Portuguese American population
- The Ironbound, Newark, New Jersey, U.S., known for being a Portuguese neighborhood
- Petersham, New South Wales, Australia, known for its extensive Portuguese community
- Portuguese Settlement, Malacca, Malaysia
