= Jemina Durning Smith =

British philanthropist (1834-1901)

- Born: 1843
- Died: 1901 (aged 57–58)
- Occupation: Philanthropist

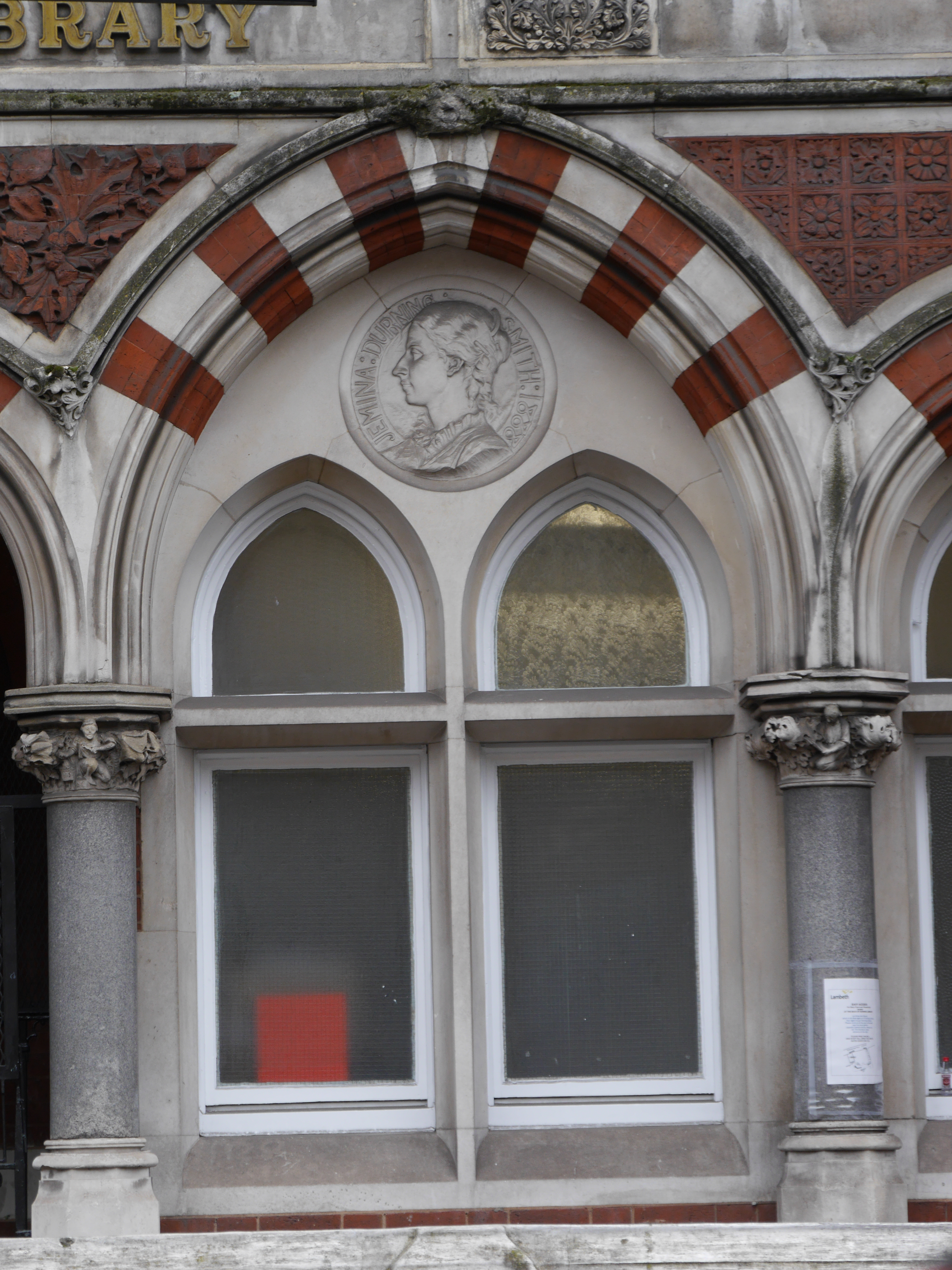
Durning Library roundel of Jemina above a window

Jemina Durning Smith (1843–1901) was a British philanthropist.

She was the daughter of the Manchester cotton merchant, John Benjamin Smith, who in 1835 becoming the founding chairman of the Anti-Corn Law League, and his wife Jemina Durning, who was an heiress from Liverpool.

She paid for the Durning Library, a Grade II listed library at 167 Kennington Lane, Kennington, London SE11, designed by Sidney R. J. Smith, in the Gothic Revival style.

She never married.
