= Portugal Day =

National holiday in Portugal

Portugal Day (Portuguese: Dia de Portugal)
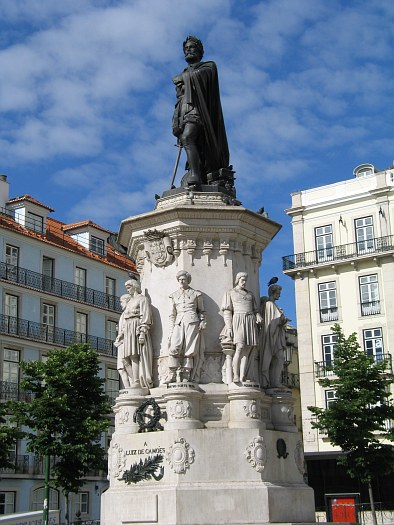
- Monument to Luís de Camões in Lisbon, Portugal (May 2005)
- Official name: Dia de Portugal, de Camões e das Comunidades Portuguesas
- Observed by: Portugal
- Type: National Day
- Date: 10 June
- Next time: 10 June 2027
- Frequency: annual
- Related to: Luís de Camões death

Portugal Day, officially Portugal, Camões, and Portuguese Communities Day (Portuguese: Dia de Portugal, de Camões e das Comunidades Portuguesas), is the national day of Portugal celebrated annually on 10 June. It is one of the public holidays in Portugal and celebrated by Portuguese people throughout the world. It commemorates the death on 10 June 1580 of Luís de Camões, a poet and national literary icon.

== Honoring Camões ==
Camões wrote Os Lusíadas (usually translated as The Lusiads), Portugal's national epic poem celebrating Portuguese history and achievements. The poem focuses mainly on the 15th-century Portuguese explorations, which brought fame and fortune to the country. The poem, considered one of the finest and most important works in Portuguese literature, became a symbol for the great feats of the Portuguese Empire.

Camões was an adventurer who lost one eye fighting in Ceuta, wrote the poem while traveling, and survived a shipwreck in Cochinchina, then under the Khmer Kingdom (today part of Vietnam). According to popular folklore, Camões saved his epic poem by swimming with one arm while keeping the other arm above water. Since his date of birth is unknown, his date of death is celebrated as Portugal's national day.

Although Camões became a symbol of Portuguese nationalism, his death coincided with the Portuguese succession crisis of 1580 that eventually resulted in Philip II of Spain claiming the Portuguese throne. Portugal was then ruled by three generations of Spanish kings during the Iberian Union (1580–1640). On 1 December 1640, the country regained its independence once again by expelling the Spanish during the Portuguese Restoration War and making John of Bragança, King John IV of Portugal.

During the authoritarian Estado Novo regime in the 20th century, Camões was used as a symbol for the Portuguese nation. In 1944, at the dedication ceremony of the National Stadium in Oeiras (near Lisbon), Prime Minister António de Oliveira Salazar referred to 10 June as Dia da Raça (Day of the Portuguese Race). The notion of a Portuguese "race" served his nationalist purposes.

Portugal Day celebrations were officially suspended during the Carnation Revolution in 1974. Celebrations resumed after 1974 and were expanded to include the Comunidades Portuguesas, Portuguese emigrants and their descendants living in communities all around the world.

== Observances ==
In 2013, the official celebrations took place in the town of Elvas, the second time since 1997. One reason that Elvas had been chosen was that it had been classified in 2012 as a World Heritage Site by UNESCO, and is one of the most important cities in Portugal at the military level and the most fortified city in Europe.

In 2016 for the first time the official ceremonies were divided between the Portuguese capital of Lisbon and the French capital of Paris, by the initiative of president Marcelo Rebelo de Sousa as a reminder that it is also the day of the Portuguese communities throughout the world.

=== In other countries ===
==== Canada ====
On 8 November 2017, the House of Commons unanimously passed Davenport M.P. Julie Dzerowicz's Private Member's Bill M-126, declaring June as Portuguese Heritage Month and 10 June as Portugal Day in Canada. M-126 recognizes the contributions that Portuguese-Canadians have made to Canada and the importance of educating and reflecting upon Portuguese heritage and culture for future generations. This now opens these occasions to being recognized and celebrated at a national level instead of only by municipalities or provinces.

In Toronto, Ontario, over 200,000 Portuguese-Canadians celebrate by holding a multitude of events surrounding 10 June date. The week-long festival culminates with the Portugal Day Parade on Dundas Street, in the area known as Little Portugal. The parade ends near Trinity Bellwoods Park, where concerts, cultural events and various other activities take place. The Portugal Day Parade is Toronto's third-largest street festival and first celebrated in 1966.

==== United Kingdom ====
In 2010 and 2011, festivities were celebrated on 13 June and 12 June, respectively, in Kennington Park, southeast London, in the area known as Little Portugal.

The 2012 observance was held on 10 June in Kennington Park. The officials and athletes representing Portugal at the 2012 Summer Olympics were based in Little Portugal near Kennington Park, and attended Portugal Day 2012 in Kennington Park. In 2013, the event was held on Sunday, 9 June 2013 in Kennington Park as in previous years.

In 2014 the event was not held, but was held in 2015 on Sunday 14 June in Streatham Common Park and this was the first time that a fee was charged to enter. The event in 2016 was also planned to be a paid event on Sunday 12 June in Streatham Common Park, but was cancelled due to heavy rain.

==== United States ====
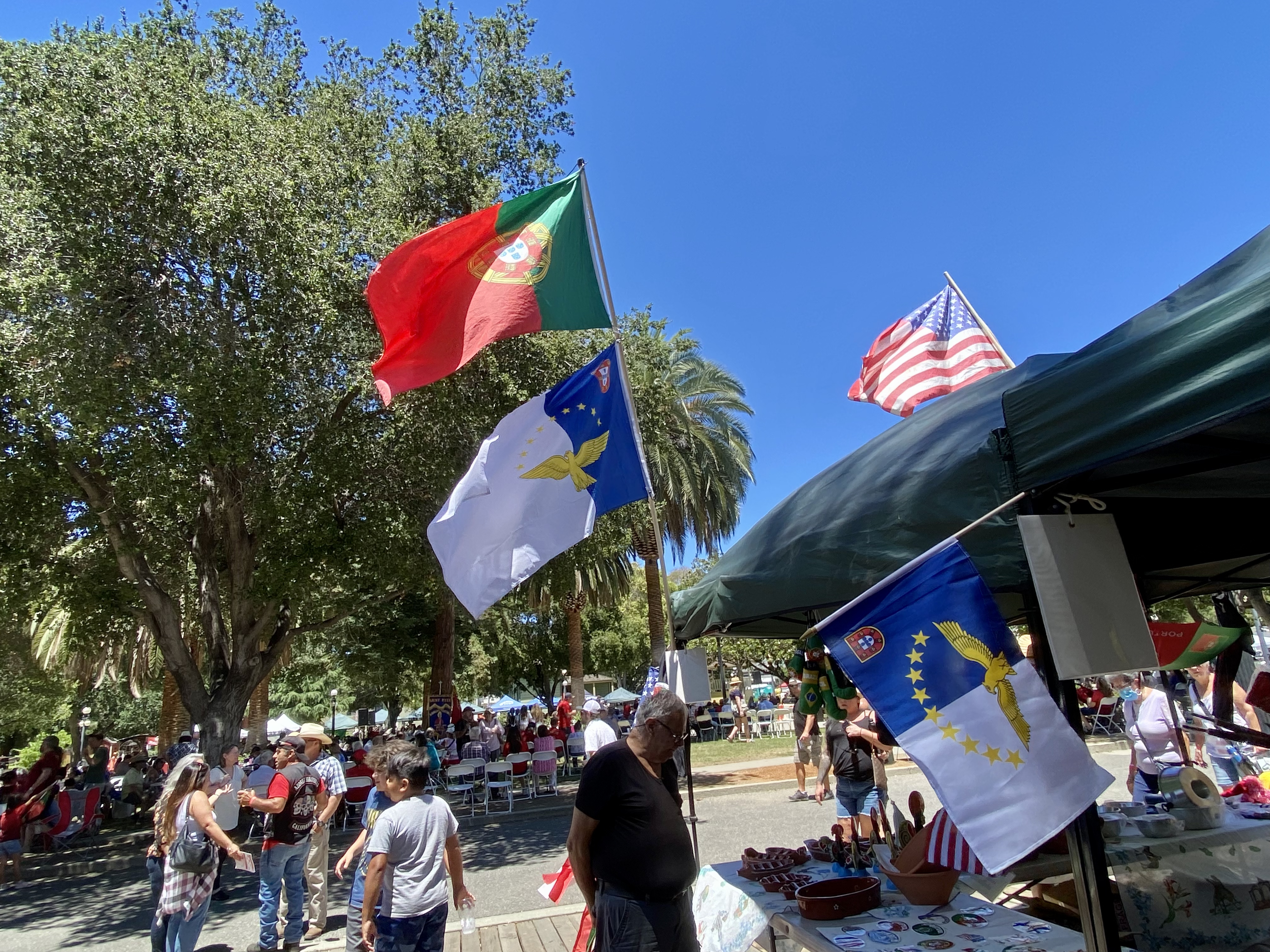
2022 Portugal day celebration in San Jose, California organized by Portuguese Historical Museum

Portuguese Americans celebrate the holiday throughout the country, especially in Portuguese American neighborhoods, including in:

- In Newark, New Jersey, the Portugal Day Festival in Newark is held on the weekend closest to 10 June. Organized by the Bernardino Coutinho Foundation from 1979 to 2010, since 2011 the festival has been organized by the Union of Portuguese-American Clubs of New Jersey (UCLANJ: União de Clubes Luso-Americanos de New Jersey).
- In Mineola, New York, the Nassau County Portugal Day Celebration is held annually at the Theodore Roosevelt Legislative & Executive Building by the Offices of the County Executive Ed Mangano, Comptroller George Maragos and a dozen Portuguese-American clubs and organizations. In 2013, the event was held on Monday 10 June 2013 and featured the Ambassador of Portugal to the United States, Nuno Brito, as the Keynote Speaker. The event was first organized by Gabriel Silva Marques, who still serves as the Event Chairman. In 2012, the first Portuguese-American New York State Senator Jack M. Martins was named "Nassau County Portuguese-American of the Year" and made an honorary chairman of the event.
- In Providence, Rhode Island, there is an annual Day of Portugal and Portuguese Heritage event.
- In San Jose, California, the Portuguese Heritage Society of California organizes Dia de Portugal California in the city's History Park, the location of the Portuguese Historical Museum.
- In Philadelphia, Pennsylvania, the Philadelphia Portuguese Heritage Commission organizes Portugal Day at Penn's Landing, where the Portuguese ship Gazela is docked.
- New Bedford, Massachusetts has held an annual Day of Portugal celebration for two decades, attracting "tens of thousands of attendees."

==== Brazil ====
Portugal Day is celebrated in several Brazilian cities, such as Rio de Janeiro and São Paulo. As Brazil was once a Portuguese colony, with millions of people of Portuguese descent and thousands of Portuguese citizens today, Portugal Day is celebrated throughout the country. In 2017, the official celebrations of Portugal Day, Camões Day, and Portuguese Communities Day took place in Porto, Portugal, and in the Brazilian cities of Rio de Janeiro and São Paulo, as announced by the President of the Republic. After Paris in 2016, this was the second time that the official celebrations took place in two or more different cities, one of which was outside Portugal.

== See also ==
- Community of Portuguese Language Countries
- Portuguese Heritage Society (Mineola, New York)
- Public holidays in Portugal
