= Portugal (disambiguation) =

Portugal is a country in southwestern Europe.

Portugal may also refer to:

== Places ==
- Portugal (European Parliament constituency), coterminous with the country
- Kingdom of Portugal, in existence from 1139 to 1910
- County of Portugal, two medieval counties
- Continental Portugal, the mainland area of the country
- Portugal Cove–St. Philip's, a town in Newfoundland and Labrador, Canada

== Other uses ==
- Portugal (surname)
- Portugal (film), 2018 film by Lauri Lagle

== See also ==
- Category:National sports teams of Portugal for teams called "Portugal"
- Portugal national football team
- Portugal. The Man, American psychedelic rock band
- Portuguese (disambiguation)
- 3933 Portugal, an asteroid
- Little Portugal (disambiguation)
- Poortugaal, a village in the Netherlands
- Portugalete, a town in the Basque Country, Spain
- Porthcawl, a town on the south coast of Wales
