= Platanos College =

Location
- Clapham Road; Stockwell, Greater London, SW9 0AL; England
- Coordinates: 51.47356°N 0.11937°W

Information
- Type: Academy
- Motto: Attitude Determines Altitude
- Department for Education URN: 136450 Tables
- Ofsted: Reports
- Headteacher: Judette Tapper
- Gender: Mixed
- Age: 11 to 16
- Website: www.platanoscollege.com

Platanos College (formerly Stockwell Park High School) is a mixed secondary school located in the Stockwell area of the London Borough of Lambeth, England.

The school was converted to academy status on 1 February 2011, and was previously a foundation school administered by Lambeth London Borough Council. The school continues to coordinate with Lambeth London Borough Council for admissions.

Platanos College offers GCSEs as programmes of study for pupils. The school also offers a grammar school pathway for gifted pupils.

== Performance and inspection ==
In 2019, the school's Progress 8 and Attainment 8 scores at GCSE were both above average.

As of 2021, the school's most recent inspection by Ofsted was in 2014, with a judgement of Outstanding.
