= Portuguese Heritage Society =

The Portuguese Heritage Society, also known as Lusitano, is a national not-for-profit organization based in Mineola, New York, founded in 1995. Its members and volunteers support, spread, and enrich Portuguese culture for those living in the United States. P.H.S. Lusitano is primarily active in Long Island, Newark, and other Portuguese-populated locales in the Tri-State area.

== Objectives ==
For centuries the Portuguese people have been emigrating to various parts of the world, forming communities, and organizing social groups. P.H.S. Lusitano has three primary objectives:

1. provide a place where any Portuguese or Portuguese-descendant can socialize and interact with each other to preserve and spread their culture
2. expand Portuguese culture within the membership ranks and the community by bringing comedians, singers, performers, and politicians from Portugal to perform or speak in the United States
3. support Portuguese communities, donating resources to local Portuguese charities as well as those serving Portuguese communities abroad

A recent trend is the growing number of Portuguese emigrants and their descendants uniting and collaborating via online social networking services.

== Charitable work ==
The P.H.S. Lusitano organizes fundraisers to donate annually to the local police and fire departments, volunteer ambulance corps, and various other community programs. The group has also donated to causes in Barcelos, Chaves, Paredes de Coura, Vila Verde, and Timor. The P.H.S. Lusitano also raises funds for local Portuguese people with critical needs.

== Other activities ==
=== Sports honors ===
League	Year	Trophy
ENYSSA	2009	Manning Cup Runner's Up
LISFL	2009	Cangero Cup Finalists
LISFL	2008/2009	Long Island Division 1 Champions
LISFL	2008/2009	Long Island Eastern Division Champions
LISFL	1998/1999	Division 3 Edwards Cup Champions
LISFL	1984/1985	Division 2 Themann's Cup Champions
LISFL	1983/1984	Division 2 Themann's Cup Runner's-Up

=== Political speakers ===
Name	Office	Reason for Visit
Carolyn McCarthy	United States Congresswoman	Meeting with Members
Andrew Cuomo	New York State Attorney General	Press Conference
Craig Johnson	New York State Senator	Press Conference
Liz Kreuger	New York State Senator	Press Conference
Michelle Schimel	New York State Assemblywoman	Meeting with Members
Jack Martins	Village of Mineola Mayor	Meeting with Members
Fernando Ribeiro dos Reis	Vila de Barcelos (Portugal) Mayor	Fundraiser

=== Invited performers ===
Name	Profession
Jose Malhoa	Singer
Ana Malhoa	Singer
Ruth Marlene	Singer
Fernando Rocha	Comedian
Carmen Duval	Fadista
Monica Sintra	Singer
