= Portugal (surname) =

Portugal is a surname derived from the country of the same name. People with the name Portugal include:

- Alfonso Portugal (1934–2016), Mexican football player
- Anne Portugal (b. 1949), French poet
- Francisco de Portugal, 3rd Count of Vimioso (1550–1582), Portuguese nobleman, Constable of António, Prior of Crato, during the War of the Portuguese Succession (1580–1583).
- Eliezer Zusia Portugal (1898–1982), Rabbi (first Skulener Rebbe)
- Hugo Sánchez Portugal (1984–2014), Mexican football commentator
- Marcelo Portugal Gouvêa (1938–2008), Brazilian football manager
- Marcos Portugal (1762–1830), Portuguese opera composer
- Mark Portugal (b. 1962), United States baseball player
- Miguel Ángel Portugal (b. 1955), Spanish footballer
- Yisroel Avrohom Portugal (1923–2019), Rabbi (second Skulener Rebbe)

== See also ==
- Portugal (disambiguation)
