= Annie McCall =

English doctor

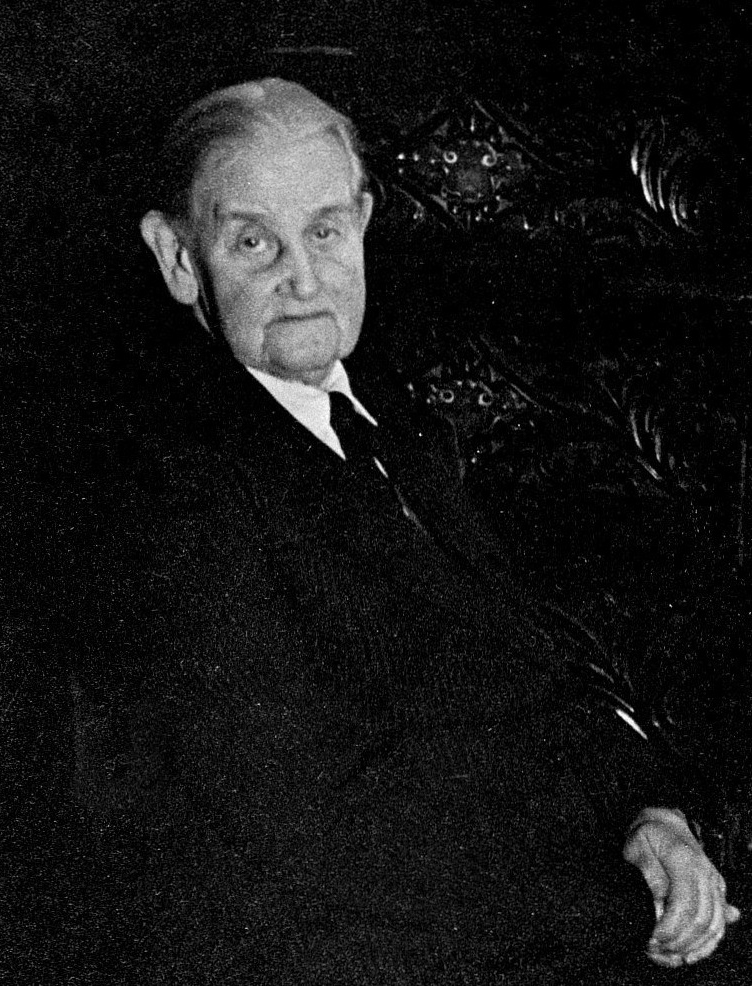
Annie McCall

Annie McCall (23 September 1859 – 1949) was a British medical doctor and was a significant contributor to the modern practice of midwifery.

== Early years ==
Annie McCall was born in Manchester. Even as a child she knew she wanted to go into medicine, and was encouraged and supported by her mother, who provided her with an excellent education. She studied in Göttingen Germany, Paris, Bern and Vienna before entering the London School of Medicine for Women. She qualified in 1885 as one of the first 50 women doctors and her interests included midwifery and tuberculosis.

== Founder of Clapham Maternity Hospital ==
McCall was from the beginning deeply concerned about the high death rate of mothers during childbirth. Shortly after qualifying in 1885 she started a school of midwifery in her own home at 165 Clapham Road.

In 1889, with Miss Marion Ritchie, she opened the Clapham Maternity Hospital at 41 & 43 Jeffreys Road, Stockwell. This had both antenatal and postnatal clinics and set high standards of hygiene and nursing care. The hospital was the first maternity hospital staffed entirely by women doctors and only women students were admitted. A district midwifery service was also provided to deliver women in their own homes. The hospital was renamed the Annie McCall Maternity Hospital in 1936. In 1938 it was expanded when 39 Jeffreys Road was purchased, giving the hospital the capacity for fifty beds for in-patients. The architectural work was undertaken by the architect Gertrude Leverkus. Unfortunately the hospital was bombed during the Second World War in 1940, causing it to be closed down.

McCall retired in 1941 and died in 1949 but the hospital was rebuilt after her death and the main hospital building continued as an NHS maternity hospital until 1970. The building was abandoned by Lambeth Council. It was under the guardianship of an Artists' Cooperative organisation, Stockwell Studios, for many years, during which time it was protected from potential council demolition and granted a Grade II listing. It was sold by the council to developers and converted to residential use in 2014.

As a member of the Temperance movement, McCall did not allow her nurses or patients to drink alcohol. Smoking was only permitted outside the hospital.

The hospital also had a Battersea branch at 31 & 33 Albert Bridge Road which opened in 1892, with a dispensary at 2 Albert Bridge Road.

== Pioneering work in midwifery and childcare ==
Through her pioneering work in the fields of midwifery and childcare she achieved very low death rates among her patients.

The hospital was also going against the tide in taking in all women who needed attention during childbirth, including poor women, and unmarried women. Each patient received a manual; ‘What to do to have a Healthy Baby’. This manual contained all sorts of advice from the diet the pregnant woman should stick to prior to birth, to the kind of exercise she should be taking.

McCall was the vice chair of the London County Council Midwives Act Committee.

== Commemoration ==
In 2026, English Heritage unveiled a blue plaque in honour of McCall at 68 McCall Close, Stockwell, formerly the site of her Clapham Maternity Hospital.
