= Streatham Library =

Library in the London Borough of Lambeth, England

Coordinates: 51.4316°N 0.1292°W

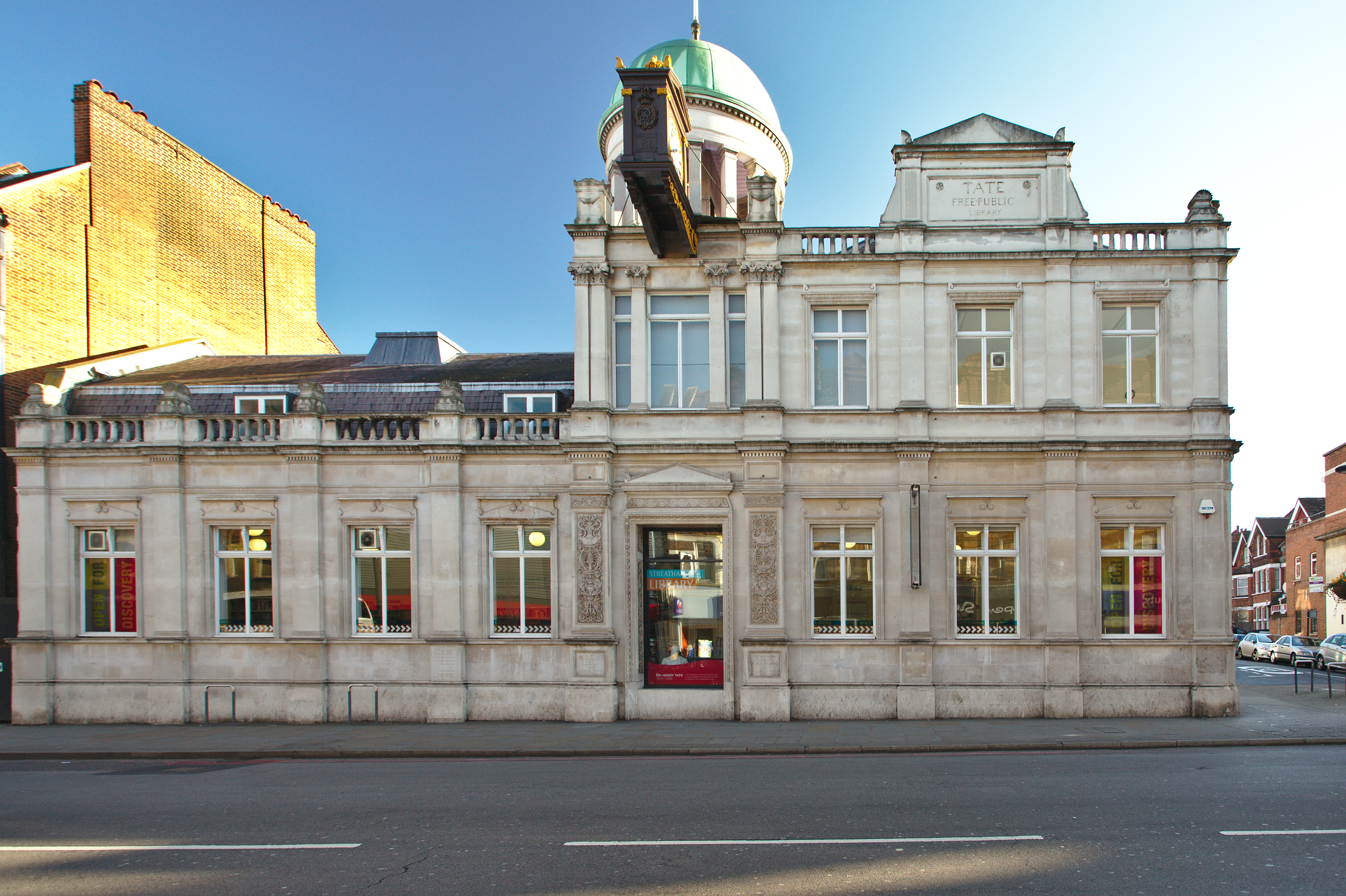
- Steatham Library
- Location: 63 Streatham High Road; London, SW16, United Kingdom
- Type: Public library
- Established: 1890 (136 years ago)
- Branches: 1

Other information
- Website: www.lambeth.gov.uk/places/streatham-library

Streatham Library is located at 63 Streatham High Road, Streatham, in the London Borough of Lambeth, England. The Library opened in 1890, and is one of several historical libraries in the vicinity which were built by Henry Tate. It is a public library.

== Henry Tate and the foundation of Streatham Library ==
Henry Tate was the financial and organisational force behind the foundation of Streatham Library. The son of a clergyman, when he was 13 he became a grocer's apprentice in Liverpool. After a seven-year apprenticeship, he was able to set up his own shop. His business was successful, and grew to a chain of six stores by the time he was 35.

In 1859 Tate became a partner in John Wright & Co. sugar refinery, selling his grocery business in 1861. By 1869, he had gained complete control of the company, and renamed it to Henry Tate & Sons. In 1872, he purchased the patent from German Eugen Langen on a method of making sugar cubes, and in the same year built a new refinery in Liverpool.

Tate rapidly became a millionaire, and donated generously to charity. In addition to his donations which eventually gave rise to the Tate Gallery, his anonymous and discreet gifts included £42,500 for Liverpool University, £3500 for Bedford College for Women, and £5000 for building a free library in Streatham; additional provisions were made for libraries in Balham, South Lambeth, and Brixton. There was £10,000 for the library of Manchester College, Oxford, and, also to Manchester College, £5000 to promote the ‘theory and art of preaching’. In addition he gave £20,000 to the (homoeopathic) Hahnemann Hospital in Liverpool in 1885, £8000 to the Liverpool Royal Infirmary, and £5000 to the Queen Victoria Jubilee Institute, which became the Queen's Institute for District Nurses. In 1887 he gave £5000 to the Tate Institute in Silvertown.

Tate was made a baronet in 1898, the year before his death. He lived at Park Hill by Streatham Common, south London. He married a second time after moving to London in 1881, and his wife, being born locally, influenced Tate in benefacting libraries in the local area. He is buried in nearby West Norwood Cemetery, the gates of which are located opposite a public library that he endowed. Park Hill became a nunnery after his death until refurbishment as housing around 2004.

== Early years ==
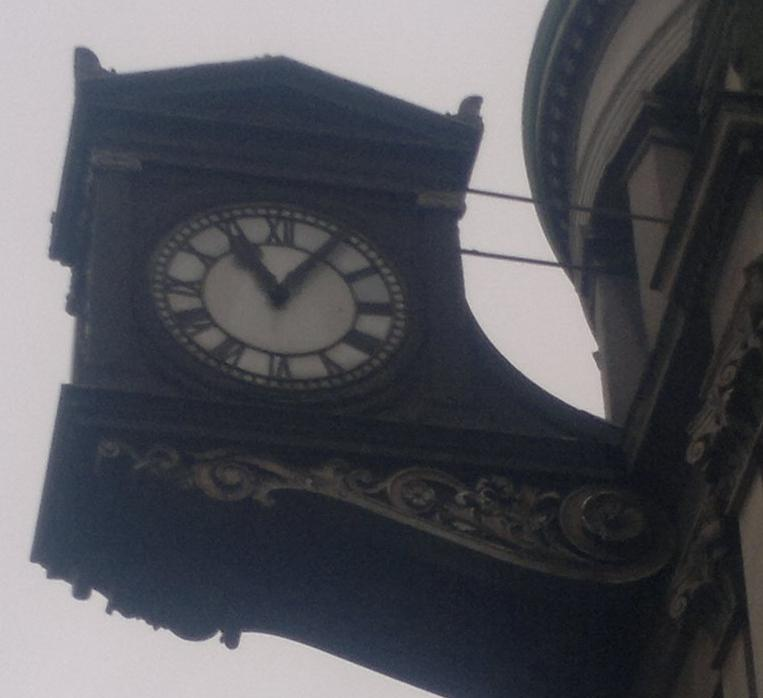
The King Edward VII Memorial Clock on the exterior of Streatham Library

Mr Sidney R. J. Smith was employed as the architect for the Streatham and Lambeth Central (Brixton) Libraries. He also designed the Tate Gallery.

Tate was appointed chairman of the commissioners for the library in 1883, and remained in office until his death. Streatham was the only library established under his control. The Streatham Free Library Act was passed in December 1889, and on 24 February 1890, a special body of library commissioners were appointed by the parish vestry. Of the 7,550 voters on the register, 2,470 voted for and 1,326 voted against the Act.

Streatham Library opened in 1890, originally consisting of two reading rooms, a lending library, and the librarians office. The library was erected on the site of Goslin's Field, on which cattle used to graze before being butchered by the local butcher, John Gosling. The clock was added to the building in 1912, as a memorial to King Edward VII. The money was raised by public subscription. Originally it had been hoped to build a clock tower in tribute to the king, but insufficient money was raised, and all that could be afforded was the clock visible today.

== Streatham Library today ==
Streatham Library is run by Lambeth Council, and is one of a network of nine public libraries in the borough. Joining the library is free of charge, and borrowing books is free, but there are charges for the hire of other items such as and DVDs and Language Courses. Library members can borrow up to a maximum of 20 items or books, including up to 6 audio-visual items, (DVDs, and Language Courses).

Streatham Library has 28 public computers, with access to the internet, and various common software products for word processing, spreadsheets, etc. Six of these computers are in the Junior and Teenage sections, and reserved for younger library members, while the remainder are open to adults. Access to these computers is free, and borrowers can have up to a maximum of two hours per day access to a PC. There are also printing and photocopying facilities in the library.

Regular events at Streatham Library include a weekly Parent & Toddler Group, on Tuesdays at 1:30 pm, which features stories and music for children, aged up to two. Story time on Wednesdays at 10:30 am is similar, but is aimed at children between two and five years old.

The Reading Group meets on the first Wednesday of the month at 7 pm, and discusses a new book, usually literary fiction, that they have all read in the previous weeks.

Free help and support is available every Tuesday at 10:30 am-12 pm. We welcome beginners or those seeking to improve their skills on computers, tablets or smart phones, Book a free one-to-one training session with a member of library staff by phone on 020 7926 6768 or email StreathamLibrary@lambeth.gov.uk

You can also play casual Chess at the Library every Tuesday at 4:30 pm–7:30 pm throughout the year. The club is run in partnership with Streatham & Brixton Chess Club, and players of all ages and abilities are welcome including beginners. We ask that all children under 10 years are accompanied by an adult. There is nothing to pay and you do not have to be a member of the club to participate.

Our Over 50's club meets on the last Friday of the month, and features activities such as talks, music, table quizzes, and gentle exercise classes. New members are always welcome.
