= Stockwell =

Coordinates: 51°28′5″N 0°7′14″W

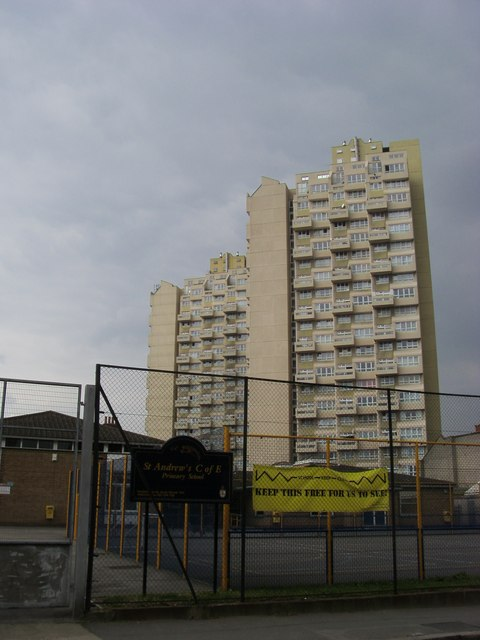
- Late-twentieth century flats on Grantham Road

- Location within the United Kingdom
- OS grid reference: TQ305755
- Greater London
- Country: England
- Sovereign state: United Kingdom
- Post town: LONDON
- Postcode district: SW4, SW8, SW9
- Dialling code: 020
- UK Parliament: Vauxhall and Camberwell Green

Stockwell is an urban district located in the SW9 postcode area of South London, England. It is now part of the London Borough of Lambeth. Before 1889, it was part of Surrey.

It was developed in the nineteenth century as an architecturally elegant middle class suburb, some of the buildings of which remain. However, in the second half of the twentieth century, much social housing for low-income tenants was developed there.

Like neighbouring South Lambeth, it contains one of the United Kingdom's biggest Portuguese communities which is known as 'Little Portugal'.

== History ==
A map showing the Stockwell ward of Lambeth Metropolitan Borough as it appeared in 1916

The name Stockwell is likely to be derived from that of a local well that was adjacent to a "stoc" (which is Old English for a tree trunk).

From the thirteenth century until the nineteenth century, Stockwell was a rural manor on the edge of London. It included market-gardens and John Tradescant's botanical garden (which is now commemorated in Tradescant Road, which was built over it in 1880, and in a memorial outside St Stephen's church).

In the nineteenth century it developed as an architecturally elegant middle class suburb. Remnants of that nineteenth-century architecture remain in its side-streets and back-streets, notably in the Stockwell Park Conservation Area (which was mostly built between 1825 and 1840 and centred on Stockwell Park Road), Stockwell Park Crescent, Durand Gardens, and Albert Square.

Before the creation of the County of London in 1889, Stockwell was part of Surrey. The area around Stockwell tube-station was extensively rebuilt following the Second World War, and the original domed tube-station was replaced first in the 1920s, and again, with the opening of the Victoria line, in 1971. In the second half of the twentieth century much architecturally unattractive social housing for low-income tenants was developed in the area: the main estates are Lansdowne Green, Stockwell Park, Studley, Spurgeon, Mursell, and Stockwell Gardens. Its only twentieth-century building of architectural interest is Stockwell Bus Garage.

== Politics ==
Stockwell is currently covered by two wards in the London Borough of Lambeth: Stockwell East, returning two councillors, and Stockwell West and Larkhall, returning three councillors. At parliamentary level it is in the Vauxhall and Camberwell Green constituency, represented by Labour MP Florence Eshalomi.

From 1979 to 1982, future Labour MP and New Labour minister Peter Mandelson was a ward councillor.

== Places of interest ==
- Stockwell Bus Garage
- London Deep Level Shelters
- Stockwell War Memorial Clocktower
- Jean Charles de Menezes Memorial
- former Annie McCall Hospital, Jeffries Road
- Stockwell skateboard park

== Schools ==
There are three schools in the ward of Stockwell: St Stephen's, Allen Edwards, and Stockwell Primary School, and also a campus of Lambeth College. In the Stockwell area (on Clapham Road) there is also Platanos College, a secondary school, Lansdowne School and numerous primary schools including Van Gogh Primary.

== Churches ==
Afro-Caribbean communities have influenced Christianity in the area, in which they have several congregations, some of which share churches with ethnically British Anglican and Catholic congregations. One of the many Afro-Caribbean churches is C. A. C. Stockwell.

== Population of Stockwell ==
Stockwell and neighbouring South Lambeth are home to one of the UK's biggest Portuguese communities that is known as 'Little Portugal'. Most of Stockwell's Portuguese originate from Madeira and Lisbon. They have established many cafes, bakeries, delicatessens, restaurants, and associations.

Stockwell is also home to many people of Caribbean and West African origin. They have established cafes, grocers, barbers' shops, and salons.

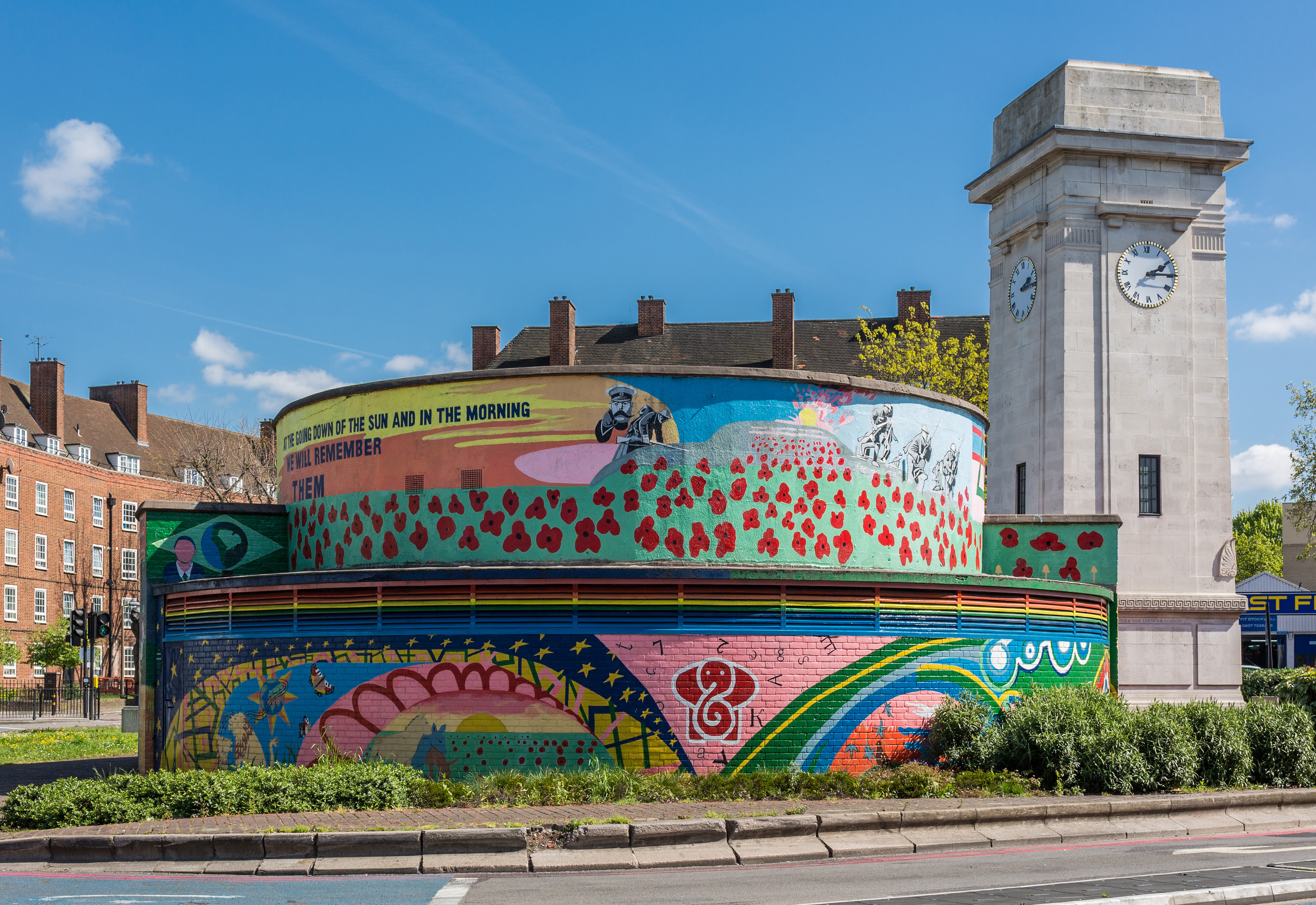
Stockwell war memorial and shelter

== Notable residents ==
- Lilian Bayliss, theatre and opera director
- David Bowie, musician
- Adam Buxton, comedian
- Nathaniel Clyne, footballer
- Joe Cornish, comedian
- Jerry Dammers, musician and founder of The Specials
- Paul Davis, Arsenal footballer
- Kenneth Erskine, serial killer dubbed the 'Stockwell Strangler' who in 1986 killed seven elderly victims, three of whom were from Stockwell
- Vincent van Gogh, artist
- Joan Littlewood, theatre director
- Joanna Lumley, actress of the Lumley family
- Peter Stanley Lyons, choral musician and educator
- John Major, UK Prime Minister
- Roots Manuva, musician
- Roger Moore, actor
- Jim Murphy, Scottish Labour Party leader
- Arthur Rackham, book illustrator
- Gary Raymond, actor
- Dot Rotten, musician
- Will Self, journalist
- Violette Szabo, SOE agent
- Edward Thomas, poet
- Hero Fiennes Tiffin, actor of the Twisleton-Wykeham-Fiennes family

== Stockwell shooting ==
On 22 July 2005, following the failed 21 July 2005 London bombings, Stockwell gained notoriety as the scene of the shooting by police of an innocent Brazilian electrician, Jean Charles de Menezes, on a tube train.

== Locale ==
=== Nearest places ===
- Brixton
- Vauxhall
- Kennington
- Clapham
- Battersea
- Nine Elms
- South Lambeth
- Camberwell
- Elephant and Castle

== Transport ==
=== London Underground ===
Stockwell tube station is served by the Victoria and Northern London Underground lines.

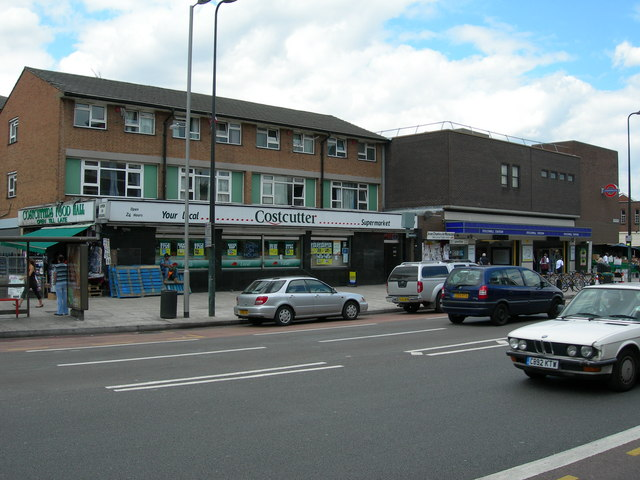
Stockwell Station

To the south, the Victoria line terminates one stop away at Brixton. The Northern line terminates in the south at Morden, which provides Stockwell with a direct link to Clapham and South Wimbledon.

To the north, the Victoria line runs through Central London towards Walthamstow Central, stopping at several key stations including Victoria, Oxford Circus, King's Cross St Pancras and Tottenham Hale. The Northern Line carries passengers northwards towards Kennington and Camden Town. Most trains from Stockwell run through the City of London via Elephant & Castle, Bank and Moorgate. Some trains run on the Charing Cross Branch via Waterloo, Charing Cross and Tottenham Court Road. Beyond Camden Town, the Northern line links Stockwell directly to Edgware and High Barnet in north London.

Other nearby stations include Brixton (Victoria line) or Clapham North (Northern line) to the south of Stockwell, and Vauxhall (Victoria line) or Oval (Northern line) to the north.

In 2017, there were 11.7 million entries and exits at Stockwell tube station.

=== National Rail & London Overground ===
There is no National Rail station in Stockwell, but several stations can be found in the locale:

- Some Southeastern services from Victoria call at Brixton railway station, linking Stockwell to Dulwich, Penge, Orpington and destinations in Kent.
- At Vauxhall, some South Western Railway services from Waterloo carry passengers to south west London, Surrey and Berkshire destinations.
- London Overground's Windrush line services call at Wandsworth Road and Clapham High Street to the south of Stockwell on direct journeys between Clapham Junction and Dalston Junction or Highbury & Islington in north London, linking the Stockwell area to Peckham and Shoreditch directly.

=== Road ===
Several major roads pass through Stockwell, including:

- the A23 (Brixton Road) - from the A3 to Brixton, Streatham, the M23 and Gatwick Airport;
- the A202 (Kennington Oval) - to Vauxhall and Victoria, or Camberwell, Peckham, the A2 and A20 (towards Kent);
- the A203 (Stockwell Road/South Lambeth Road) - between the A202 and A23;
- the A2217 (Acre Road);
- the A3 (Clapham Road) - to Elephant & Castle and the City, the M25, Guildford and Portsmouth;
- the A3036 (Wandsworth Road).

The A23, A202, A203 and A3 are managed by Transport for London (TfL).

Most other roads are residential.

==== Pollution ====
Pollution around Stockwell has been a concern for local health professionals and authorities since the mid-2000s, largely owing to the number of arterial routes in the neighbourhood.

A 2010 study found that, in Stockwell, 7 deaths each year could be attributed to exposure to particulate matter (PM2.5), compared to 139 in the London Borough of Lambeth as a whole in the same year (2008). Road traffic is a primary source of air pollution in Lambeth.

In 2016, Clapham Road south of Stockwell was identified by the local authority as an area of concern when it came to tackling air quality in the Borough, as this section of road is "exceeding EU limits for the gas Nitrogen Dioxide (NO2)." Lambeth monitor air quality on Clapham Road in Stockwell using diffusion tubes. Since the introduction of the Oval STN, the pollution in the adjacent part of Clapham Road has got worse.

=== Buses & coaches ===
London Buses routes 2, 50, 88, 155, 196, 333, 345, P5, N2 and N155 serve Stockwell.

Some National Express coaches pass through Stockwell, with some services towards Gatwick Airport, Worthing, Bognor Regis and Eastbourne stopping in the area.

=== Cycling ===
Cycle Superhighway 7 (CS7) follows Clapham Road through Stockwell, largely on cycle lanes to segregate cyclists from other road traffic. The signed cycle route carries cyclists from Colliers Wood and Tooting Bec in the south, through Stockwell, to Oval, Elephant & Castle and the City of London. The route runs non-stop from Stockwell to all its destinations, but the route is not entirely traffic-free.

Just to the north of Stockwell, Cycle Superhighway 5 (CS5) terminates in a junction with CS7, linking Victoria and Millbank to Stockwell using a cycle track, separating cyclists from other road traffic.

Quietway 5 (Q5) runs on residential streets in the north of Stockwell, offering a slower but quieter signposted route direct to Clapham or Waterloo.

With two Cycle Superhighways in the locale, many junctions in the area are equipped with cycling infrastructure. Santander Cycles, a bike-sharing system in London, operates in Stockwell.
