= All-Party Parliamentary Group on Portugal =

UK parliamentary group

The All-Party Parliamentary Group on Portugal is an all-party parliamentary group of the Parliament of the United Kingdom. Its primary focus is on increasing awareness among members of both Houses about Portugal, encouraging ongoing political, trade and business relations between the United Kingdom and Portugal.

== History ==
In 2016 the Portuguese Chamber of Commerce in UK was involved in setting up the All-Party Parliamentary Group (APPG) on Portugal, when it was asked to be the Group's Public Enquiry Point and its acts as the APPG's secretariat and regularly donates money to the APPG.

== Current and previous officers ==
The APPG has four officers in total: One Chair, Two Vice-Chairs and One Treasuer, below is the list of officers since the last Annual general meeting held on 5 November 2024:

Current Officers
MP/Lord	Party	Joined	Role
Valerie Vaz MP	Labour	4 November 2020	Chair
Baroness Hooper	Conservative	13 February 2019	Vice-chair
Christine Jardine MP	Liberal Democrats	20 November 2024	Vice-chair
Florence Eshalomi MP	Labour Co-op	20 November 2024	Treasuer
