= A203 road =

Road in England

Coordinates: 51.4723°N 0.1222°W

A203

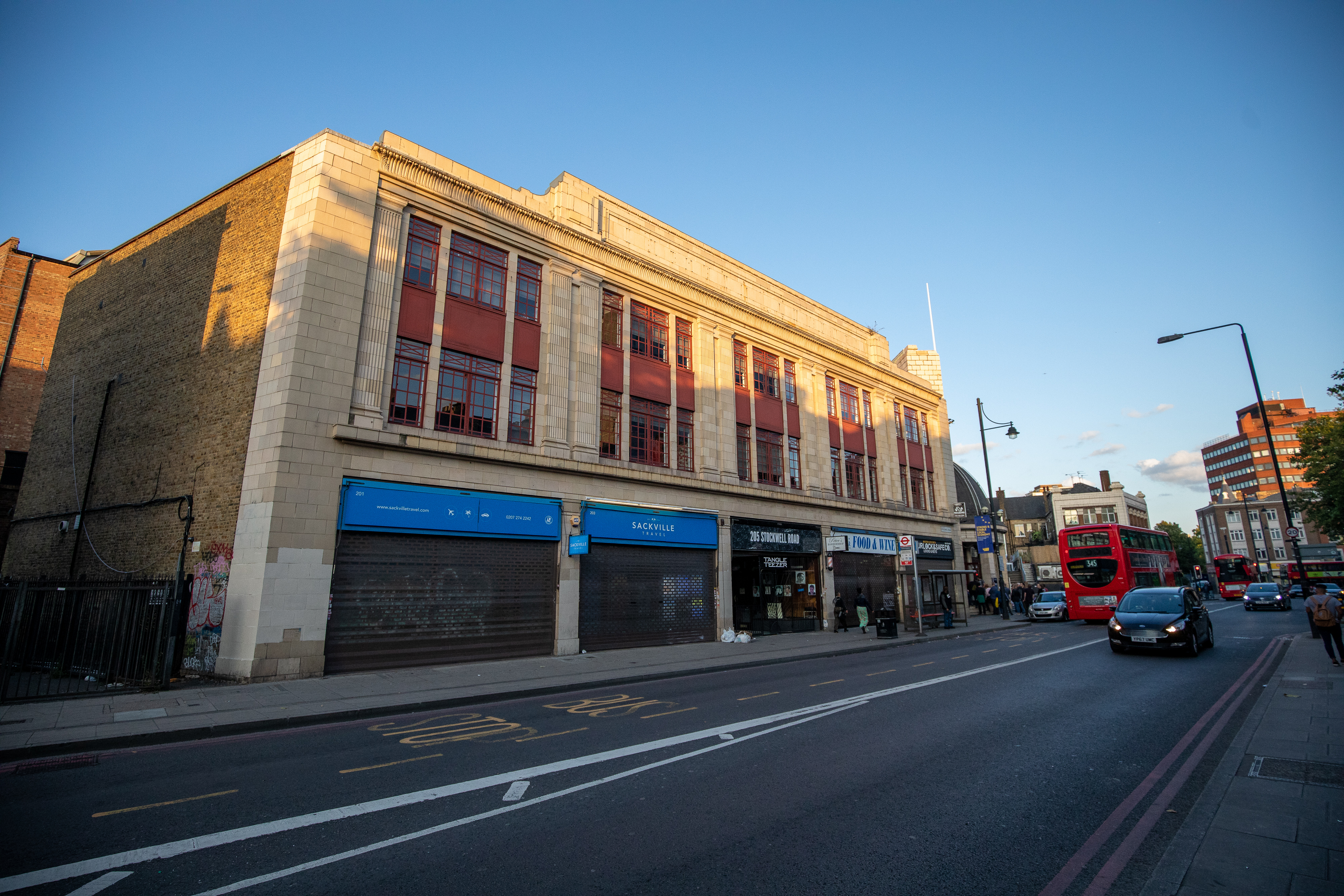
- A203 Stockwell Road in Brixton

Major junctions
- North West end: Brixton
- A23 A202; A3
- South East end: Vauxhall

Location
- Country: United Kingdom
- Primary destinations: Brixton; Stockwell; Vauxhall

Road network
- Roads in the United Kingdom; Motorways; A and B road zones

The A203 is a primary A road in South London, running from Brixton to Vauxhall. It is managed by Transport for London (TfL).

== Route ==
It runs from Brixton to Vauxhall connecting the A23 and A3 with Vauxhall Bridge, the Albert Embankment as well as the London Inner Ring Road for travel across the River Thames.

=== Stockwell Road ===
Between Brixton and Stockwell Underground station it is known as Stockwell Road, as the road leads up to/away from the area of Stockwell.

=== South Lambeth Road ===
North of here it is called South Lambeth Road because it passes through the area of South Lambeth. It travels through the Little Portugal district before reaching its northern terminus in Vauxhall, near the River Thames at Vauxhall Bridge.

== Victoria line ==
It is roughly paralleled by TfL London Underground's Victoria line through its route.
