= Sidney R. J. Smith =

British architect (1858–1913)

Sidney R. J. Smith (1858–1913) was a Late Victorian English architect, best known for the work he undertook in the 1880s and 1890s for the philanthropist Henry Tate including the original Tate Gallery at Millbank.

== Works ==
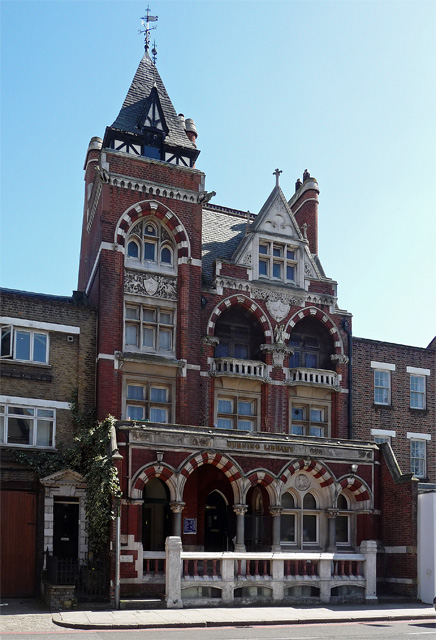
Durning Library, 2013

- Outdoor Relief Station, Norwood (1887)
- Tate Free Library, South Lambeth Road (1887)
- Durning Library, Kennington (1889)
- Tate Free Library, Streatham (1890)
- Tate Free Library, Brixton Oval (1892)
- Cripplegate Institute, 1 Golden Lane (1896)
- National Gallery of British Art (Tate Gallery) (1897)
- 16–19 Dunraven Street, Mayfair (1897)
- St Thomas, Telford Park, Streatham Hill (with Spencer William Grant)
- Tate Mausoleum, West Norwood Cemetery (c.1890)
- Euston Underground station, City and South London Railway (1907) (demolished)
