= Durning Library =

1889 library in Kennington, London

Coordinates: 51.488889°N 0.110218°W

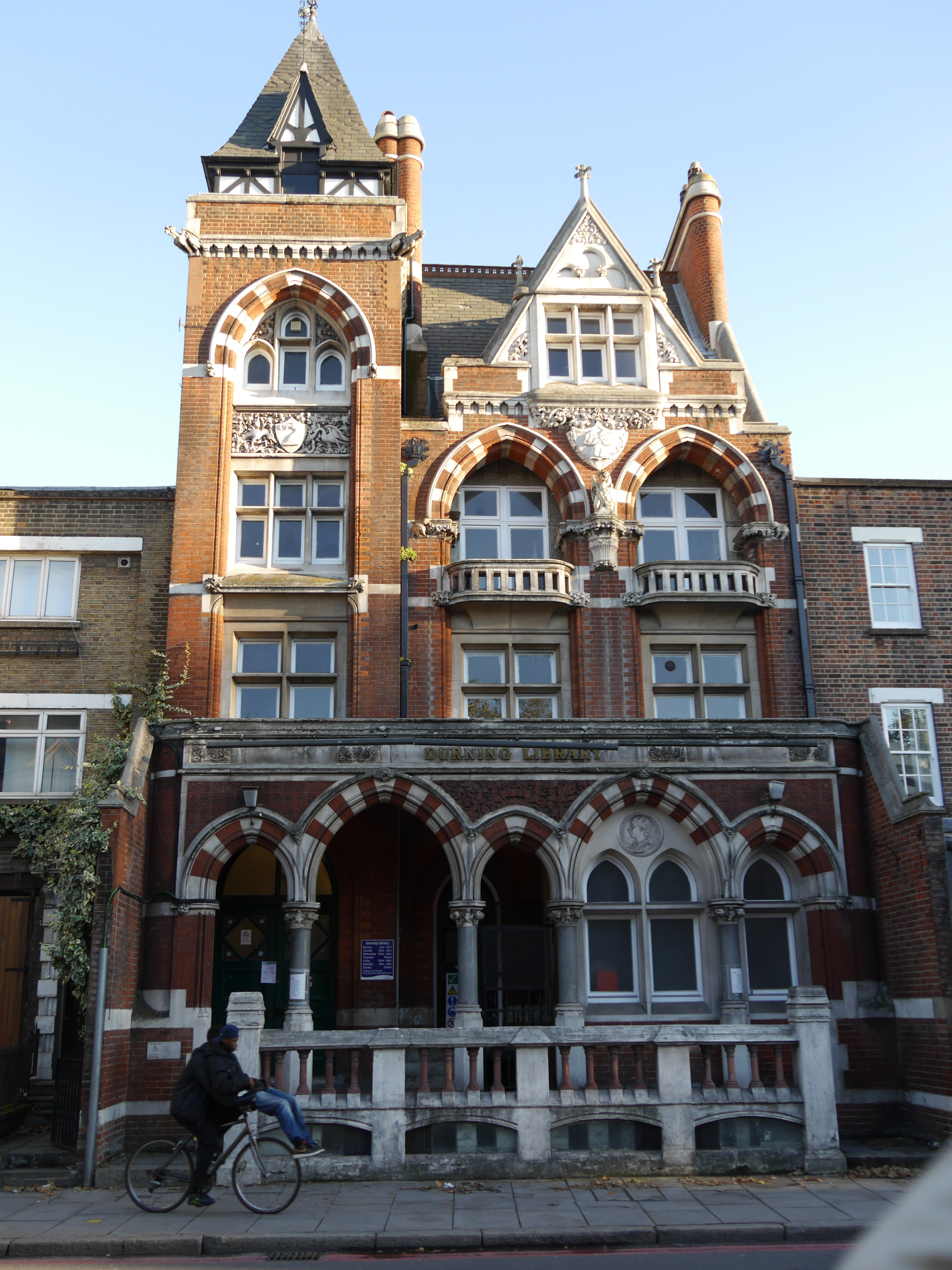
- Durning Library
- Location: 167 Kennington Ln, London SE11, United Kingdom
- Type: Public library
- Established: 1889 (137 years ago)
- Branches: 1

Collection
- Items collected: Books, public records

Other information
- Website: www.lambeth.gov.uk/places/durning-library

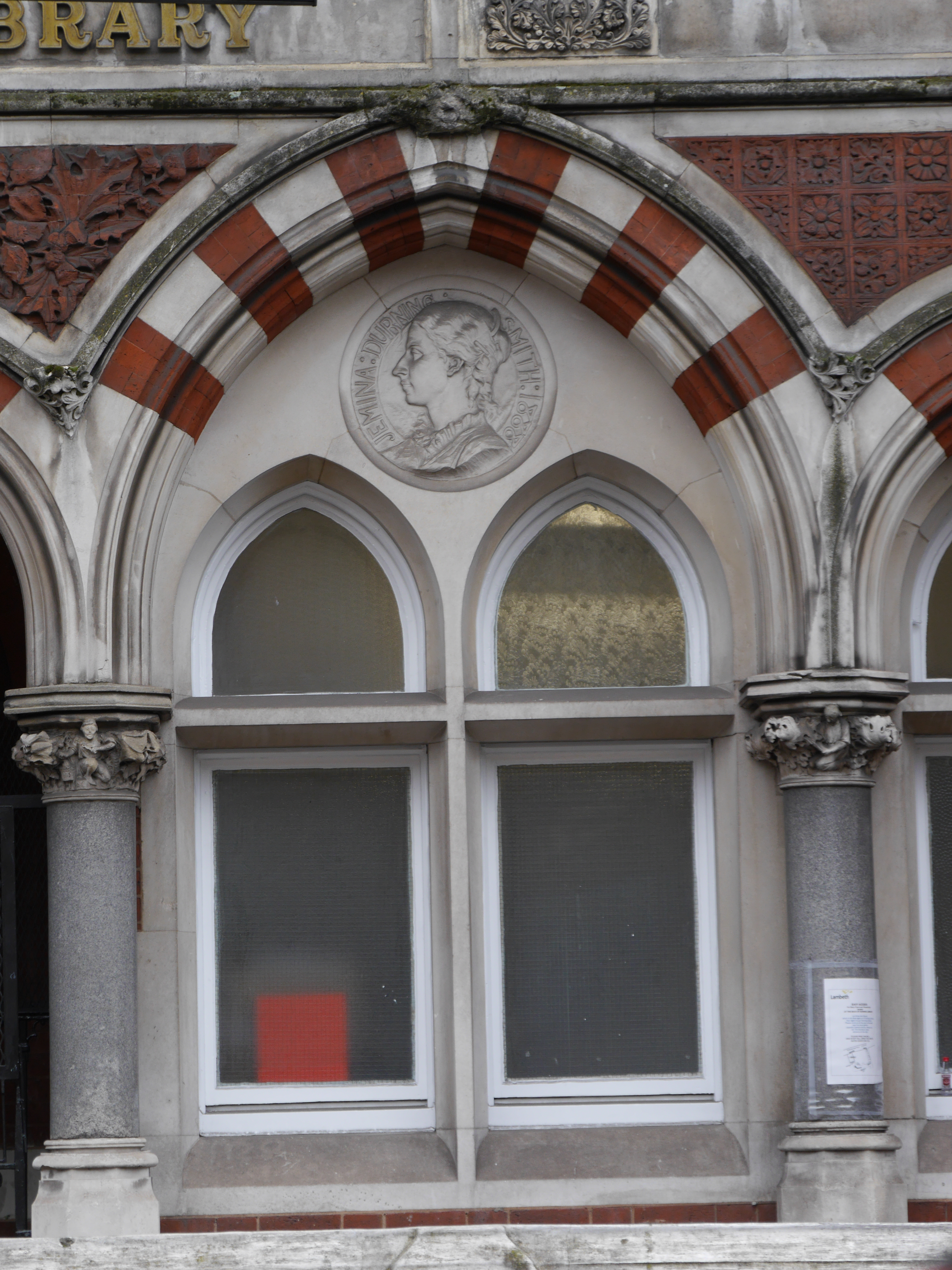
Roundel of philanthropist Jemina Durning Smith above a window at the library

Durning Library is a public lending library in Kennington, London. It is part of Lambeth Libraries in the London Borough of Lambeth and is in purpose-built Grade II listed building at 167 Kennington Lane, London SE11.

The Durning Library was built in 1889 and designed by Sidney R. J. Smith, the architect of Tate Britain, in the Gothic Revival style. It was a gift to the people of Kennington from Jemina Durning Smith.
