= Brixton Library =

Public library in Brixton, London

Coordinates: 51°27′40″N 0°06′53″W

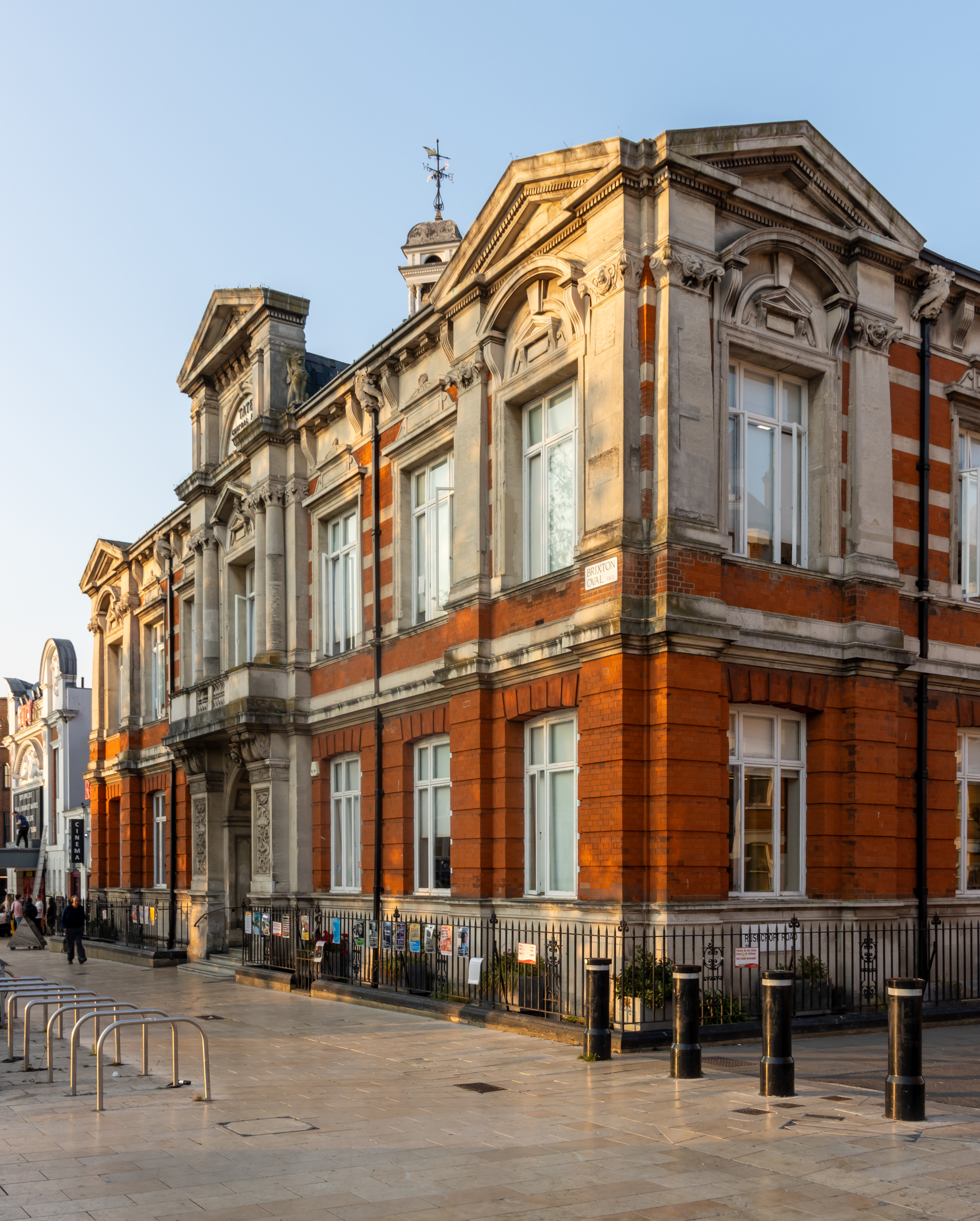
- Brixton Tate Library, Brixton Oval (2025)
- Location: Brixton Oval, Brixton, London, SW2, United Kingdom
- Type: Public library
- Established: 1892 (134 years ago)
- Branches: 1

Collection
- Items collected: Books, public records

Other information
- Website: https://www.lambeth.gov.uk/libraries-0/brixton-tate-library

The Brixton Library (also known as the Brixton Tate Library) is a public library in the London Borough of Lambeth in Brixton, South West London. It was built in the 1890s by the sugar magnate Sir Henry Tate and is a Grade II listed building.

== History ==
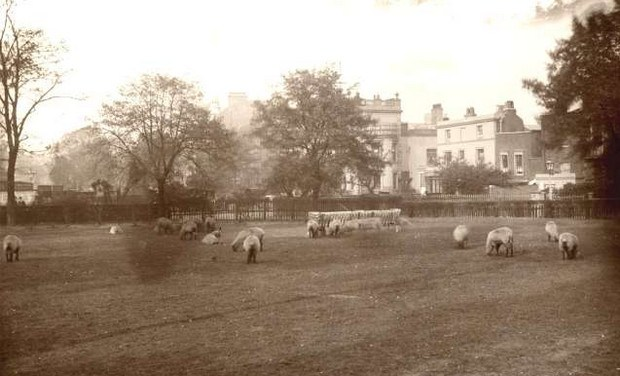
Rush Common, Brixton, around 1892

Brixton library was once part of common land called Rush Common. An Act of Parliament in 1806 "stipulated that 'no Buildings or Erections above the Surface of the Earth' should be erected upon Rush Common within 150 feet of the London to Croydon Turnpike Road (now Brixton Road and Hill)". In 1891–3, Sir Henry Tate built the library at a cost of £15,000, and it was opened by the Prince of Wales on 4 March 1893.

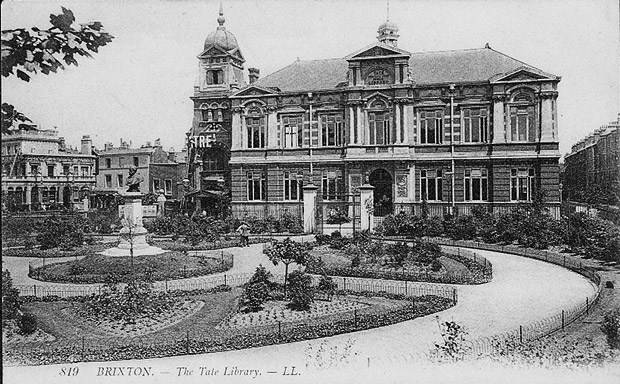
Brixton library in 1905

According to the Survey of London (1956), "the architect was Sidney R.J. Smith, and the builders were F. and H.F. Higgs. A brass tablet in the entrance hall records that the garden in front of the library was given in 1905 by Amy, Lady Tate in fulfilment of a wish of her husband Sir Henry Tate".

Dame Amy Tate had bought the land in front of the library in 1904 and created a public garden, with a bust of Tate at its centre which now stands in front of the library. The bust of Tate is a Grade II listed structure.

The theatre next to the library was destroyed by bombing in 1940, allowing the nearby cinema to expand into its place. This cinema is now known as the Ritzy cinema, of which the bar and cafe now stand on the theatre's former site. The library has been Grade II listed since 1999.

== Present day ==
Today the library houses a collection of books that include reference encyclopaedias, as well as books in Bengali, Chinese, French, German, Italian, Polish, Portuguese, Russian and Spanish. The building is wheelchair accessible and has computers and internet access for users.

The library also offers free digital skills training and hosts live music performances and other events. In 2024 the library hosted an exhibition of Sir Frank Bowling's work.
