= Portuguese-American neighborhoods =

Ethnic neighborhoods

In the late 19th century, many Portuguese, mainly from the islands of Azores and Madeira, migrated to the United States and established communities in cities such as Fall River, Massachusetts, New Bedford, Massachusetts; and San Jose, California. Many of them also moved to Hawaii. There are an estimated 1,500,000 Portuguese Americans based on the Government Census Community Survey.

== List of Portuguese American neighborhoods ==
=== Alabama ===
- Mobile

=== Arizona ===
- Sedona
- Tucson

=== California ===
- Artesia, "International District", known for ethnic diversity
- Bakersfield (Kern County)
- Camarillo
- Castro Valley
- Ceres
- Cherryland
- Chino
- Chowchilla
- Corona
- Culver City - Little Brazil, also has Portuguese
- Dana Point
- Delano
- Denair
- El Granada
- Empire
- Excalon
- Fairfield
- Ferndale
- Fort Bragg
- Fremont
- Fresno
- Gilroy
- Gustine
- Half Moon Bay
- Hanford
- Healdsburg
- Hilmar
- Hollister
- Keyes
- Kings County
- Lathrop
- Lemoore
- Long Beach
- Los Angeles - Little Portugal in San Pedro. Also, Pico Boulevard (Mid-City) - concentrations extend to Central Los Angeles
- Los Banos
- Manteca
- Modesto (and surrounding towns in the Central Valley)
- Monterey
- Newark
- Newman
- Newport Beach
- Norco
- Oakdale
- Oakland - largest Portuguese city in California
- Oakley
- Ontario
- Orange County (esp. around Tustin)
- Orland
- Pasadena
- Petaluma
- Pismo Beach
- Point Loma
- Port Hueneme
- Porterville (and surrounding towns in the Central Valley)
- Portuguese Bend on the Palos Verdes Peninsula
- Redondo Beach
- Rio Vista
- Ripon
- Riverside - has a Portugal Day event
- Sacramento - could be largest Portuguese community in US
- Salida
- Salinas near Salinas Valley
- San Diego including the Little Italy neighborhood. The surrounding San Diego area has many Portuguese.
- San Francisco - Luso-American cultural center
- San Jose - "Little Portugal" neighborhood
- San Juan Bautista
- San Leandro, city near Oakland with a large Portuguese population.
- San Lorenzo
- San Martin
- San Mateo County
- San Pablo
- San Rafael, Marin County
- Santa Barbara
- Santa Clara in the Lafayette Street area
- Santa Clara County
- Santa Cruz in the Seabright neighborhood
- Santa Cruz County
- Santa Maria
- Santa Monica
- Shasta Lake
- Sonora
- Stockton
- Sunol
- Torrance
- Tracy
- Tulare
- Turlock
- Vallejo
- Ventura
- Visalia - part of the Portuguese settlement of the San Joaquin Valley
- Watsonville
- West Los Angeles - Little Portugal has Portuguese, more Brazilians and Latin Americans
- Yuba City

=== Connecticut ===
- Ansonia
- Bozrah
- Bridgeport
- Chester
- Clinton
- Colchester
- Danbury ("Little Portugal" neighborhood)
- Darien
- Ellington
- Hartford
- Naugatuck
- New Canaan
- Newington
- Rocky Hill
- Stonington
- Wallingford
- Waterbury, home to the Portuguese consulate in Connecticut
- Weston
- Windsor Locks

=== Delaware ===
- Bethany Beach
- Dover
- Lewes
- New Castle
- Newark
- Rehoboth Beach
- Seaford
- Smyrna
- Wilmington

=== District of Columbia ===
- Washington, D.C.

=== Florida ===
- Apalachicola
- Avon Park
- Belle Glade
- Blountstown
- Boca Raton
- Bonifay
- Bradenton
- Brooksville
- Cape Coral
- Casselberry
- Cedar Key
- Chattahoochee
- Chiefland
- Clermont
- Clewiston
- Cocoa
- Crescent City
- Crystal River
- Dade City
- Davie
- DeBary
- Deltona
- Doral
- Everglades City
- Fellsmere
- Fernandina Beach
- Fort Myers
- Fort Walton Beach
- Gulf Breeze
- Haines City
- Hallandale Beach
- High Springs
- Highland Beach
- Holmes Beach
- Homestead
- Jacksonville Beach
- Lady Lake
- Lake City
- Lake Wales
- Lakeland
- Lantana
- Lauderdale Lakes
- Lighthouse Point
- Longboat Key
- Marco Island
- Margate
- Miami - includes Brazilians and Cape Verdeans
- Milton
- Miramar
- Monticello
- Moore Have
- New Smyrna Beach
- Niceville
- North Lauderdale
- Oakland Park
- Okeechobee
- Orlando
- Palatka
- Palm Bay
- Palm Beach
- Palm Beach Gardens
- Palm Coast
- Palmetto Bay
- Panama City Beach
- Parkland
- Pensacola
- Pinecrest
- Plant City
- Plantation
- Pompano Beach
- Port Orange
- Port St. Lucie
- Punta Gorda
- Safety Harbor
- San Antonio
- Sanford
- Sarasota
- Southwest Ranches
- St. Augustine
- St. Petersburg
- Stuart
- Sunny Isles Beach
- Sunrise
- Tallahassee
- Tamarac
- Temple Terrace
- Tequesta
- Titusville
- Venice
- West Park
- Weston
- Wilton Manors
- Winter Garden
- Winter Haven
- Zephyrhills

=== Georgia ===
- Acworth
- Americus
- Atlanta
- Augusta
- Bainbridge
- Blairsville
- Canton
- Clarkesville
- Clayton
- Cleveland
- Columbus
- Cumming
- Cuthbert
- Dawsonville
- Decatur
- Donalsonville
- Dublin
- Ellijay
- Fayetteville
- Fitzgerald
- Flowery Branch
- Folkston
- Hartwell
- Jasper
- Johns Creek
- Jonesboro
- Kennesaw
- LaGrange
- Lithonia
- Loganville
- Lookout Mountain
- Macon
- Milledgeville
- Monroe
- Newnan
- Norcross
- Peachtree City
- Peachtree Corners
- Ray City
- Savannah
- Smyrna
- Stone Mountain
- Thomaston
- Thomson
- Tifton
- Toccoa
- Tybee Island
- Valdosta
- Winder

=== Hawaii ===
- Ewa Beach
- Haleiwa
- Hawaii (Big Island)
- Hilo
- Honokaa
- Honolulu
- Kahului
- Kailua
- Kalaheo
- Kaneohe
- Kapaa
- Kapaau
- Kauai
- Kekaha
- Koloa
- Lihue
- Makawao
- Maui
- Molokai
- Naalehu
- Paia
- Waialua
- Waianae
- Wailuku
- Waimanalo
- Waimea

=== Idaho ===
- Buhl
- Wendell

=== Illinois ===
- Chicago - Little Portugal/Brazil
- Galena
- Jacksonville
- Joliet
- Mendota
- Springfield

=== Indiana ===
- East Chicago

=== Louisiana ===
- New Orleans
- Opelousas

=== Maine ===
- Augusta
- Bangor
- Bar Harbor
- Boothbay Harbor
- Brewer
- Bucksport
- Calais
- Cape Elizabeth
- Caribou
- Castine
- Cherryfield
- Danforth
- Dover-Foxcroft
- Fort Fairfield
- Freeport
- Frenchville
- Gorham
- Houlton
- Islesboro
- Jay
- Kittery
- Lewiston
- Lyman
- Machias
- Madawaska
- Mechanic Falls
- Ogunquit
- Presque Isle
- Rumford
- Saco
- Sanford
- Skowhegan
- South Berwick
- Stonington
- Van Buren
- Waterville
- Windham
- Yarmouth

=== Maryland ===
- Aberdeen
- Annapolis
- Bowie
- Cambridge
- Centreville
- Cheverly
- Clear Spring
- College Park
- Easton
- Elkton
- Emmitsburg
- Frostburg
- Gaithersburg
- Greenbelt
- Hagerstown
- Hancock
- Hyattsville
- La Plata
- Laurel
- Middletown
- Ocean City
- Poolesville
- Salisbury
- Thurmont
- Upper Marlboro
- Walkersville
- Westminster

=== Massachusetts ===
- Amherst
- Athol
- Attleboro
- Blackstone
- Bridgewater
- Brockton
- Cambridge
- Chicopee
- Fall River
- Falmouth
- Fitchburg
- Framingham
- Gloucester
- Hanover
- Haverhill
- Hudson
- Lawrence
- Lowell, Back Central neighborhood
- Ludlow
- Milford
- Nantucket
- New Bedford
- Norwood
- Oak Bluffs
- Paxton
- Peabody
- Pittsfield
- Plainville
- Provincetown, Massachusetts
- Rehoboth
- Somerville
- Southbridge
- Stoughton
- Taunton, 33.7% Portuguese descent
- Wellfleet
- West Stockbridge
- Williamstown
- Winchendon
- Woburn

=== Michigan ===
- Jackson
- Traverse City

=== Minnesota ===
- St. Cloud

=== Montana ===
- Bozeman

=== Nebraska ===
- Lincoln

=== Nevada ===
- Las Vegas
- Reno - along with Galicians, Spanish and Basques

=== New Hampshire ===
- Bedford
- Berlin
- Bristol
- Claremont
- Colebrook
- Concord
- Derry
- Enfield
- Exeter
- Farmington
- Franconia
- Gorham
- Jaffrey
- Keene
- Lancaster
- Lebanon
- Lincoln
- Litchfield
- Littleton
- Meredith
- Merrimack
- New London
- Newmarket
- Newport
- Pittsfield
- Plymouth
- Seabrook
- Somersworth

=== New Jersey ===
- East Newark
- Elizabeth
- Englewood Cliffs
- Harrison
- Hillside
- Kearny
- Livingston
- Long Branch
- New Brunswick
- New Providence
- Newark, high percentage of Portuguese people within the Ironbound section
  - Little Portugal, aka Little Brazil - home to many Portuguese and Brazilians, as well Spaniards and Latinos
- North Arlington
- Ocean County
- Old Bridge
- Paterson - Portuguese, Cape Verdean and Brazilian
- Perth Amboy
- Short Hills
- South Amboy
- South River
- Union Township
- Vernon Township

=== New York ===
- Buffalo
- Dobbs Ferry
- Ithaca
- Long Island
- Manhattan
- Mineola
- Mount Vernon
- Nassau County
- New Rochelle
- New York City (Little Brazil, Manhattan, inhabited by many Portuguese-speaking countries' communities, mainly Portuguese and Brazilian)
- Ossining
- Port Jervis
- Rochester
- Saratoga Springs
- Suffolk County
- Tarrytown
- Yonkers

=== North Carolina ===
- Albemarle
- Asheboro
- Brevard
- Burnsville
- Chapel Hill
- Edenton
- Fayetteville
- Forest City
- Goldsboro
- Greenville
- Hamlet
- Hayesville
- Hendersonville
- Hickory
- High Point
- Hillsborough
- Huntersville
- Jacksonville
- Jefferson
- Kannapolis
- Kings Mountain
- Kinston
- Laurinburg
- Lexington
- Louisburg
- Mint Hill
- Mocksville
- Morehead City
- Morganton
- Nags Head
- New Bern
- Newton
- Oriental
- Pinehurst
- Red Springs
- Reidsville
- Roanoke Rapids
- Robbinsville
- Rocky Mount
- Shallotte
- Shelby
- Southern Pines
- Statesville
- Tarboro
- Tryon
- Wake Forest
- Waynesville
- Wendell
- Williamstown
- Wilson
- Winston-Salem
- Wrightsville Beach

=== Ohio ===
- Columbus

=== Oregon ===
- Astoria

=== Pennsylvania ===
- Allentown, including Brazilians and other Latin Americans
- Bethlehem has a Portuguese community of around 5,000. Also has Spaniards and Hispanics.
- Chester
- Grove City
- Philadelphia (Little Portugal, Northeast Philadelphia, a large presence of Portuguese as well as Brazilians)
- Tinicum Township

=== Rhode Island ===
- Bristol in Portuguese Town. 25% in town, the state itself is 12% Portuguese.
- Central Falls
- Cranston
- Cumberland, particularly the Valley Falls section.
- East Providence
- Little Compton
- New Shoreham
- Newport
- Pawtucket, largest Portuguese city in New England
- Smithfield
- Tiverton
- Warren
- West Warwick

=== South Carolina ===
- Abbeville
- Aiken
- Batesburg-Leesville
- Beaufort
- Bluffton
- Blythewood
- Camden
- Clover
- Easley
- Edgefield
- Florence
- Fort Mill
- Greenwood
- Hanahan
- Hardeeville
- Hartsville
- Hilton Head Island
- Kingstree
- Lancaster
- Laurens
- Loris
- Marion
- Moncks Corner
- Newberry
- North Augusta
- North Myrtle Beach
- Pawleys Island
- Pickens
- Rock Hill
- Santee
- Sullivan's Island
- Summerton
- Summerville
- Sumter
- York

=== Texas ===
- Galveston
- Houston

=== Vermont ===
- Bennington
- Bradford
- Brattleboro
- Bridport
- Burlington
- Colchester
- Danville
- Fairfax
- Fairfield
- Hardwick
- Irasburg
- Milton
- Newport
- Northfield
- Norwich
- Pittsford
- Randolph
- Richford
- Rutland (city)
- Rutland (town)
- Springfield
- Stamford
- Stowe
- Swanton
- Wallingford
- Williston
- Wilmington
- Winooski
- Woodstock

=== Virginia ===
- Abingdon
- Appomattox
- Ashland
- Bristol
- Charlottesville
- Clifton Forge
- Covington
- Emporia
- Fairfax
- Falls Church
- Harrisonburg
- Herndon
- Jonesville
- Leesburg
- Lexington
- Manassas
- Newport News
- Purcellville
- Richmond
- Roanoke
- Rocky Mount
- Staunton
- Vienna
- Warrenton
- Waynesboro
- Williamsburg

=== Washington ===
- Seattle
- Walla Walla

=== West Virginia ===
- Berkeley Springs
- Bluefield
- Buckhannon
- Chester
- Clarksburg
- Dunbar
- Elkins
- Fairmont
- Gassaway
- Grafton
- Grantsville
- Hinton
- Huntington
- Hurricane
- Kingwood
- Marlinton
- Martinsburg
- Morgantown
- Moundsville
- New Martinsville
- Parkersburg
- Rainelle
- Ravenswood
- Romney
- Ronceverte
- Shepherdstown
- Shinnston
- Sistersville
- Summersville
- Vienna
- Webster Springs
- Weirton
- Weston
- Wheeling
- Williamson

=== Wisconsin ===
- Door County
- Kenosha
