= John Stewart (campaigner) =

British environmental campaigner

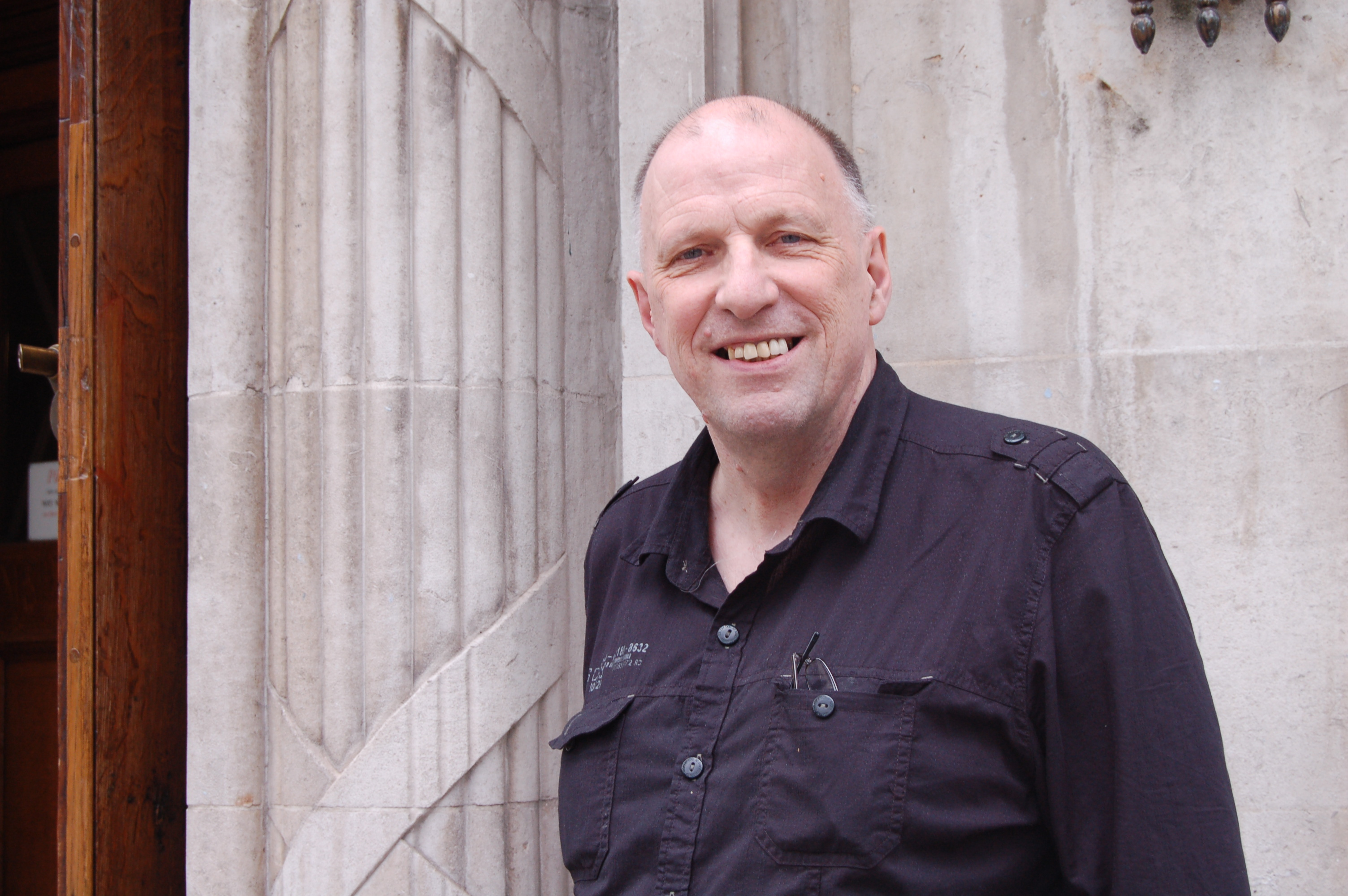
- John Stewart in 2010
- Born: 1950 (age 75–76); Southern Rhodesia
- Occupation: Environmental campaigner
- Movement: Road protest in the United Kingdom; Environmental effects of aviation
- Awards: Sheila McKechnie Foundation Long-Term Achievement Award; 2016

John Stewart (born 1950) is a British environmental campaigner who specialises in transport issues and noise pollution. In the 1980s and 1990s, he helped coordinate a national network of community groups that successfully campaigned against the British government's then-£23-billion road-building programme. Later, Stewart led the successful campaign against a third runway at Heathrow Airport. He has several times been recognised as one of Britain's most effective environmental campaigners.

== Early life ==
Stewart was born in Southern Rhodesia (now Zimbabwe) and raised in Edinburgh by a family from the Scottish Highlands. After studying social policy at Bristol Polytechnic, he moved to London in the early 1980s and has lived there ever since.

== Road campaigning ==
Stewart began campaigning in the early 1980s, initially on the issue of better public transport.

Stewart has recalled that he began fighting road-building schemes in the mid-1980s after taking a wrong turn walking through London and finding himself alongside the Blackwall Tunnel Northern Approach Road: "I was hit by a wall of fast-moving traffic all the way from the Blackwall Tunnel to the Bow flyover... And as I looked at the tower blocks, flats and estates within yards of the road and saw the children playing beside the roaring traffic, I thought: 'never again should this kind of road be built'".

Stewart later became chair of ALARM (All London Against the Road-building Menace), an umbrella group helping to link 150 local community campaigns in London. In the early 1990s, working with Twyford Down activist and poet Emma Must and transport campaigner Jonathan Bray, Stewart transformed ALARM into a national organisation, ALARM-UK, to give 250 local campaigns a more powerful voice against the UK's national road-building programme. The organisation's approach was summarised in the headline of a 1995 Guardian article as "Faith, hope and anger: An alliance between the respectable middle classes and radical activists is taking on that scourge of city life the car". As Stewart told ALARM-UK's inaugural national conference in 1993: "The Department of Transport's nightmare is that isolated local groups that have sprung up to fight a road scheme will start talking to each other, sharing information and co-ordinating campaigns. We want to make that nightmare come true".

By the mid-1990s, virtually all of the UK roads programme had been cancelled: the original 600 planned roads were cut down to just 50 by the Labour government elected in 1997.

=== Low traffic neighbourhoods ===
From 2020 onwards his campaigning efforts have been focused on opposition to low traffic neighbourhoods, putting him at odds with almost all other transport and environmental campaigners and campaign groups including, but not limited to, Sustrans, Living Streets, Greenpeace, London Cycling Campaign and Cycling UK (who support LTNs as part of a suite of measures to reduce motor traffic dominance and improve conditions for walking and cycling).

In December 2021, Stewart wrote a controversial article for the Telegraph arguing that "low traffic neighbourhoods are inherently unfair".

In 2023 he set up 'Social Environmental Justice' which campaigns against low traffic neighbourhoods and protected space for cycling on main roads (particularly 'bus stop bypasses'). The group and its members have repeatedly been quoted by Steve Bird at The Daily Telegraph (which has a consistent negative editorial position on climate and active travel) and Andrew Ellson at The Times, who has published numerous anti-LTN and anti-active-travel stories.

== Aircraft noise ==
With the roads programme in decline, Stewart switched his attention to tackling noise and nuisance from aircraft. Over the next decade, he established what John Vidal of The Guardian described as "possibly the most formidable coalition ever formed against any single building project in Britain" to oppose the controversial third runway at Heathrow. Using similar alliance-building tactics to those he'd developed at ALARM-UK, he became chair of the group HACAN (Heathrow Association for the Control of Aircraft Noise) ClearSkies, representing 60 community groups and 5,000 other individuals opposed to Heathrow Airport's proposed expansion plans. Stewart's approach, "unity of purpose, diversity of tactics", was credited with enabling radical direct action protesters to work alongside conventional campaigners, council leaders, and MPs, and the runway was scrapped in 2010. Stewart later commented: "never in UK history had the aviation industry suffered such a rebuff". The long-term outcome proved uncertain, however. After a further decade of political and legal debate, in December 2020, the UK Supreme Court paved the way for Heathrow Airport to seek planning permission for a third runway.

Stewart's high-profile Heathrow campaigning has occasionally made him a target for personal legal action. In 2007, along with two members of the Plane Stupid campaign group and a climate change activist, he was named on a High Court injunction, obtained by BAA, which sought to prevent people from "disrupting the operation of the airport". In 2011, after being detained and interrogated at JFK Airport, Stewart was barred from entering the United States for undisclosed reasons believed to be linked with his campaigning.

Stewart has also served as chair of AirportWatch (an alliance of local groups opposing airport expansion), the UK Noise Association, and the Campaign for Better Transport (formerly Transport 2000). He is Vice President of UECNA (Union Européenne Contre les Nuisances Aériennes / European Union Against Aircraft Nuisance).

Stewart stood down as chair of HACAN in 2020, but remains chair of HACAN East, a sister campaign representing communities impacted by the expansion of London City Airport.

== Other activities ==
Stewart has also campaigned more generally on noise, which he describes as "the forgotten pollutant", and, in 2016, published a book on the topic titled Why Noise Matters.

Stewart has campaigned for road safety, as a former chair of RoadPeace (which advocates for victims of road accidents) and the Slower Speeds Initiative. In 2003, commenting on the death and injury toll from road accidents, he observed: "of all the wars taking place in the world, the biggest is the war on the roads".

== Awards and recognition ==
In 2006, The Guardian listed Stewart as number 82 of the top 100 green campaigners of all time, one place behind Mahatma Gandhi.

In 2008, he was voted Britain's most effective environmental campaigner by The Independent on Sunday: "the little-known John Stewart, who leads the onslaught against a third runway at Heathrow, soundly beats far more high-profile figures – from Jonathon Porritt to Zac Goldsmith, from Sir David Attenborough to Prince Charles – to take the honour".

In 2009, he was one of three activists shortlisted for "Grassroots Campaigner of the Year" in the Observer Ethical Awards.

In 2016, Stewart won the Sheila McKechnie Foundation Long-Term Achievement Award for his three decades of environmental campaigning.

== Publications ==
- Stewart, John; McManus, Francis; Rodgers, Nigel; Weedon, Val; Bronzaft, Arline (2016). Why Noise Matters: A Worldwide Perspective on the Problems, Policies and Solutions. London: Taylor & Francis. ISBN 9781134934102.
