= Rebecca Lush =

British environmental activist

- Education: University of Bristol
- Occupation: Environmental activist
- Organization: Transport Action Network

Rebecca Lush is a British environmental activist who helped organise a number of major anti-road initiatives, including the support organisation ‘Road Block’. She joined Transport 2000 (now Campaign for Better Transport) as Roads and Climate Campaigner, exposing cost overruns, and now works for Transport Action Network in a similar role.

== Biography ==
Lush became an active environmentalist while studying politics at Bristol University and joined the 'Dongas' protest camp at Twyford Down against the construction of one of the road schemes, a new section of the M3 motorway being built close to where she grew up in 1992. This was one of many schemes outlined in the Roads for Prosperity white paper which Margaret Thatcher described as 'the largest road building programme since the Romans'. Lush successfully challenged the UK Government's Breach of the Peace legislation at the European Court of Human Rights in 1998.

In July 1993 Lush and five others (including Emma Must who later went on to win the Goldman Environmental Prize) were imprisoned for a month for breaking a High Court injunction banning them from Twyford Down. While in Holloway Prison she was visited by the then European commissioner for the environment, Carlo Ripa de Meana who was concerned about the situation.

Lush was arrested also in 1993 and ordered to agree to be bound over for twelve months, to keep the peace and pay the sum of £100. She refused and was sent to prison for seven days. She and others subsequently successfully challenged the UK Government's Breach of the Peace legislation at the European Court of Human Rights in 1998.

Lush was one of the founders of Road Alert!, a national networking service for UK road protests which supported many of the mass demonstrations of the period including the M11 link road protest and the Newbury bypass which contributed to the end of the then government's ambitious road building programme.

In 1996 the Road Alert! offices were moved to Newbury where construction of the Newbury bypass was starting. There were major protests with excess of 1,000 arrests and a policing bill of £26 million.

Between 1994 and 1997 the majority of the remaining road schemes were cancelled after which many campaigners, including Lush, stopped protesting.

In 2002 the government proposed a new major road building programme and expansion of aviation. Lush and a number of other road protest veterans visited the Department for Transport to warn of renewed direct action and delivered a D Lock as a symbol of the earlier protests. Lush founded Road Block to support a growing number of protests around the country soon afterwards.

In September 2005 Lush 'pied' motoring journalist Jeremy Clarkson after he collected an honorary degree in Engineering from Oxford Brookes University in protest at his comments on the effects of climate change. She also 'pied' the Transport Secretary, Alistair Darling when he appeared at the launch of the pro-aviation UK lobbying group, Future Heathrow, explaining "I was absolutely appalled. Why have a campaign group when you have already got the minister on your side?".

During 2006 she advised cosmetics company Lush Cosmetics (no relation) on how to support activists and the company later introduced the 'Charity Pot', a product where 100% of the purchase price (excluding VAT) goes to fund activist groups. Mark Constantine, CEO of Lush explained, "I hate cars, I really hate them, but I'd been giving up the ghost, until Rebecca came along and we started all this up".

In December 2006 Lush highlighted four priority protests; the Mottram to Tintwistle Bypass (in the Peak District National Park), plans to widen the M1 motorway and the M6 motorway and to build a new road from Heysham to M6.

In January 2007 Road Block became a project within Transport 2000 (now Campaign for Better Transport) and Lush was appointed Roads and Climate Campaigner.

While at CBT Lush researched the cost and climate change impacts of various proposed road schemes. She discovered that the estimated costs of seven major schemes had risen by £1.15 billion in a single year, increases which were criticised by the National Audit Office. Then, while researching the DfT's road scheme appraisal process she revealed that their assessment process disadvantaged schemes that reduced car use because they reduced fuel consumption and hence revenue to The Treasury. This led to direct meetings with Ruth Kelly, the Secretary of State for Transport.

Lush has written a number of articles for The Guardian.

Lush left CBT for a period of time on maternity leave to be replaced by Richard George, co-founder of Plane Stupid, before returning in 2011.

In 2020, Lush "returned to her original passion, supporting local communities campaigning on transport issues" when she joined Transport Action Network (TAN) as its Local Campaigns Support Officer. She is currently the organisation's roads and climate campaigner, working on issues such as the climate impacts of road schemes and the safety of smart motorways.

== See also ==
- Road protest (UK)
- Environmental direct action in the United Kingdom
