= Emma Must =

English environmental activist, poet, and teacher

- Born: 1966 (age 59–60)
- Occupations: Environmental activist, poet, teacher
- Awards: Goldman Environmental Prize (1995)

Emma Must (born 1966) is an English environmental activist, teacher, and poet.

== Biography ==
Must was awarded the Goldman Environmental Prize in 1995 for her efforts on land protection, particularly her influence on British road building policies through her road protest against the M3 motorway extension at Twyford Down, near where she grew up. She went on to work with Alarm UK! (an umbrella group for the nationwide road building protest), Transport 2000 (later renamed Campaign for Better Transport), and the World Development Movement.

Must studied a PhD in Creative Writing at the Seamus Heaney Centre, Queen's University in Belfast, focusing on eco-poetry and eco-criticism. She has been published in magazines and journals in Ireland and the UK, such as Abridged, The Open Ear and The Poet's Place. In 2016 she was named as one of the Rising Generation of poets by Poetry Ireland Review. In 2019 she won the inaugural Environmental Defenders Prize at the Ginkgo Awards for her poem, "Toll".

She previously worked as a librarian.

== Publications ==
- The Ballad of Yellow Wednesday. (Scarborough: Valley Press, December 2022). ISBN 9781915606044
- Notes on the Use of the Austrian Scythe. Matlock, Derbyshire: Templar Poetry, 2015. ISBN 190628542X.
- The Future always makes me so Thirsty: New Poets from the North of Ireland. Newtownards, Northern Ireland: Blackstaff, 2016. Edited by Sinéad Morrissey and Stephen Connolly, with Miriam Gamble, Stephen Sexton, Adam Crothers, and Must. ISBN 978-0856409714.

== Awards ==
- 1995: Goldman Environmental Prize
- 2013: Second prize at the Strokestown International Poetry Awards for Notes on the Use of the Austrian Scythe
- 2015: Templar Portfolio Award
- 2019: Environmental Defenders Prize at the Ginkgo Awards

== See also ==
- Rebecca Lush
