= Environmental direct action in the United Kingdom =

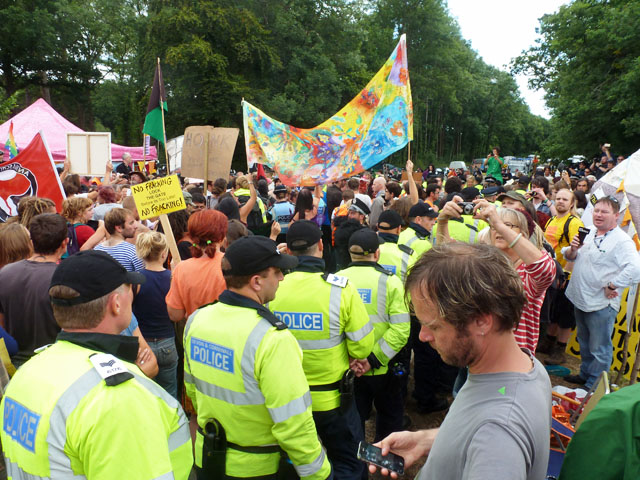
A policed march at the Balcombe drilling protest in August 2013

The modern environmental direct action movement in the United Kingdom started in 1991 with the formation of the first UK "Earth First!" group for a protest at Dungeness nuclear power station. Within two years, there were fifty Earth First groups and activists linked with other parties in the road protest movement. There were large camps at Twyford Down and the M11 link road protest. By 1997, the Government had decided to reduce its road-building plans by two thirds.

After this success, the environmental movement then took on local struggles such as fighting a quarry at Stanton Moor and opposing a new runway at Manchester Airport. It grew to include different groups such as Camps for Climate Action, Plane Stupid, Reclaim the Streets, Rising Tide and The Land is Ours. In the 2010s, new groups emerged such as Extinction Rebellion, and Grow Heathrow camps protesting against HS2. In the early 2020s there were series of actions by Insulate Britain, Tyre Extinguishers and Just Stop Oil.

== Earth First! ==
The Earth First (EF) movement in the United Kingdom started in 1991 with a protest at Dungeness nuclear power station in Kent. From its inception, Earth First was committed to direct action techniques from the group's inception, with support for only nonviolent ecotage.

Earth First consisted of a loose collection of groups and activists with no central organisation. After two years, there were fifty such groups, protesting in numbers not seen since the 1980s peace movement. The initial Earth First action focused around the importation of tropical hardwoods, with a protest at Liverpool docks in 1992. This action coincided with the Earth First roadshow, in which a group of activists toured the country.

Most actions were organised by individual groups and attended by people from other groups in the movement, some of them wore distinctive colours. Co-ordination happened through various publications including Do or Die, the Earth First! Action Update and later SchNEWS. Activist met at regular Earth First gatherings.

== Road protest camps ==
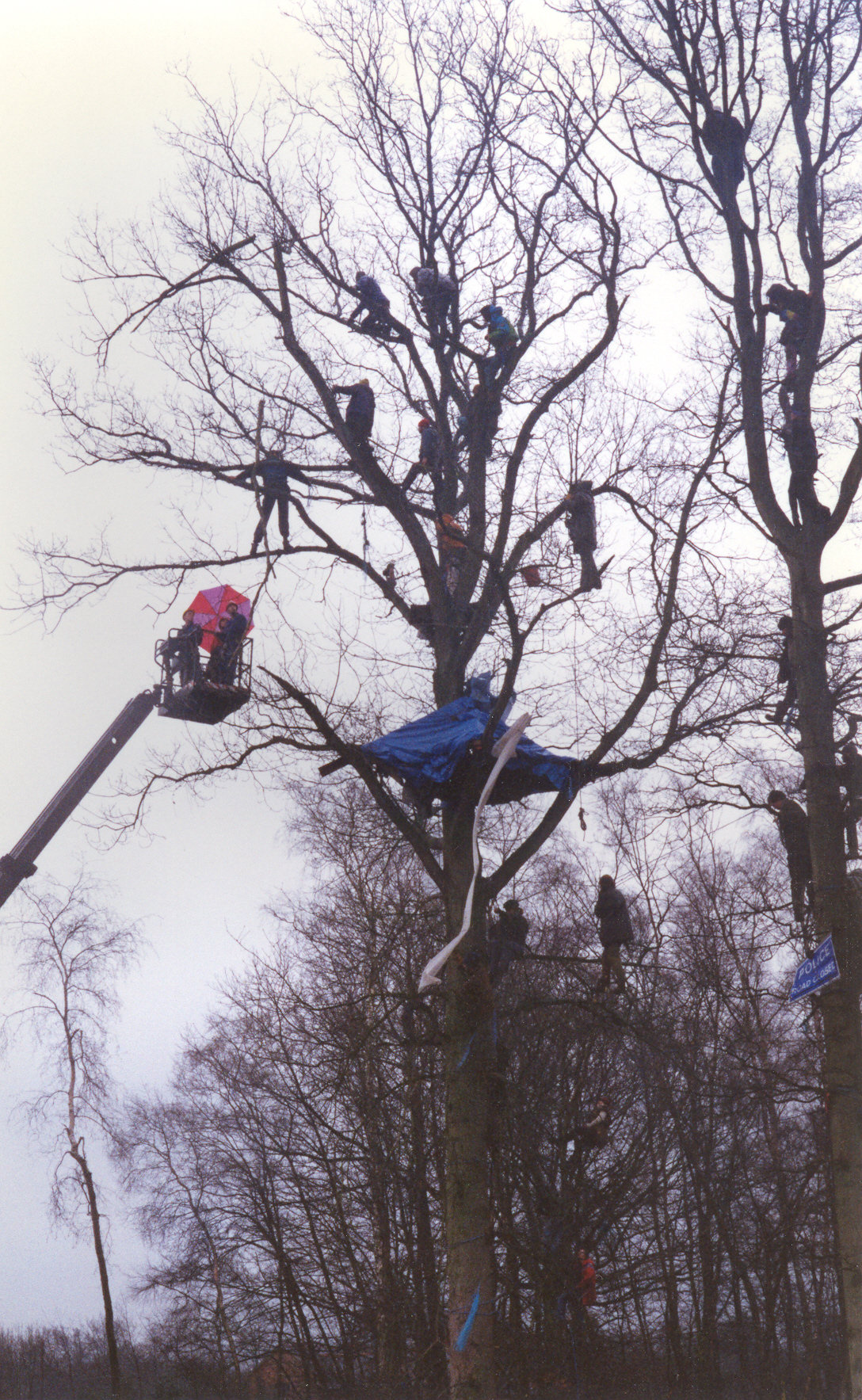
Eviction of a treehouse at a camp resisting the Newbury Bypass.

Earth First groups, together with many other groups, then became involved in the road protest movement, as an attempt to reverse the Government's road-building programme. The first major road protest happened at Twyford Down where a permanent protest camp was set up in late 1992 to oppose the construction of a new section of the M3 motorway. The Dongas tribe arose from this camp.

The first tree-sits (occupations of trees) happened at Jesmond Dene in Newcastle in 1993, organised by the Flowerpot Tribe.

Other early protests included Pollok Country Park in Glasgow, River Roddlesworth and Stanworth Valley near Preston, and at Solsbury Hill near Bath and the M11 link road protest in London, where an entire street was squatted. After the eviction of Claremont Road in 1994, protesters from the Flowerpot and Dongas tribes joined the protest at Stanworth valley to build an "Ewok village" of the tree houses.

There were many subsequent road protests including Newbury bypass, the A30, Swampy became well known during the eviction at the A30 camp, although there were many other smaller road protest camps. Some camps did actually result in roads being cancelled, the first such cancellation occurring in London.

By 1997, the Government had shrunk the road-building programme to a third of its original size. Alongside the need to save money and several reports criticising the original plans, the environmental direct action movement could claim a large role in this reduction. Another sign of its effectiveness had already been seen in 1994, when the Government had passed the Criminal Justice Act. Among other things it created a series of new offences which criminalised many forms of protest.

== Wider Earth First actions ==
The focus of Earth First broadened over time to include protesting against the Manchester Airport second runway and fighting the use of genetically modified organisms. At the Nine Ladies stone circle in the Peak District, a camp successfully helped prevent a new quarry.

The movement can be said to have given rise to a number of other groups, notably Reclaim the Streets and Rising Tide. The Land is Ours set up the Pure Genius camp on 13 acres (53,000 m^{2}) of derelict land which had previously housed a brewery owned by Guinness company. The squatters, including George Monbiot, stated they had occupied the land fifty years after the successes of the post World War II squatting movement.

== Climate activism ==
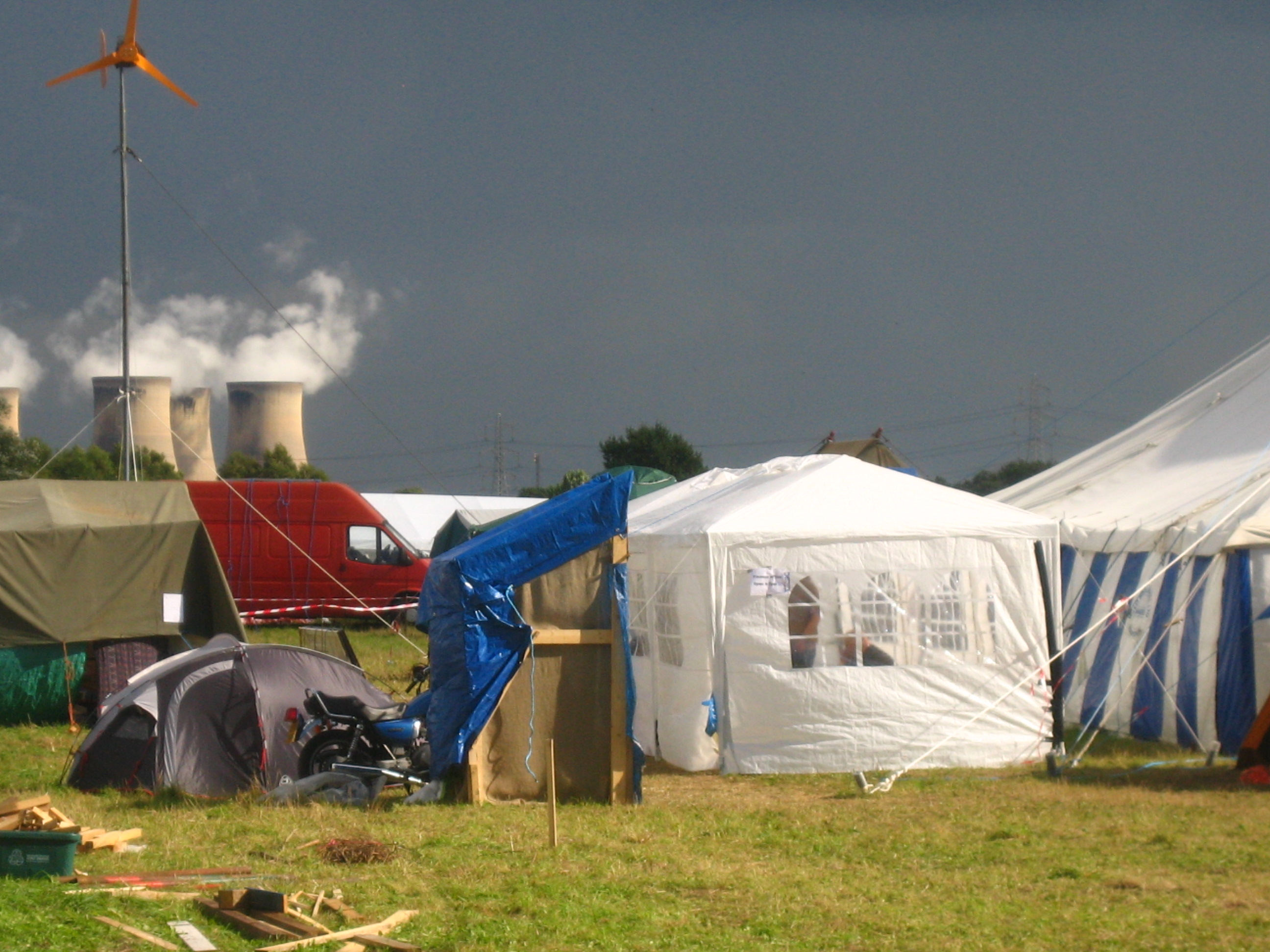
Camp for Climate Action with Drax power station in background

Direct action techniques have also been applied to climate-related issues. On 31 August 2006, 600 people attended a protest called Reclaim Power against carbon emissions at the coal-fired Drax power station in Yorkshire. The protests were coordinated by the Camp for Climate Action, a ten-day camp held near the power station. The campers had also blockaded a nuclear power station in Hartlepool, Teesside.

At a later climate camp, undercover police officer Mark Kennedy encouraged activists to commit aggravated trespass at Ratcliffe-on-Soar Power Station and the trial of six people subsequently collapsed when this was revealed.

Actions carried out by the Plane Stupid group include the grounding of planes through the establishment of a climate camp on an airport taxiway and occupations of offices belonging to airport operator BAA and short-haul airline, EasyJet. On 8 December 2008, the group breached the perimeter of London Stansted Airport, causing a runway to be closed for three hours and the cancellation of 56 Ryanair flights. The protest was in response to the announcement that a second runway would be built at Stansted and there were 57 arrests.

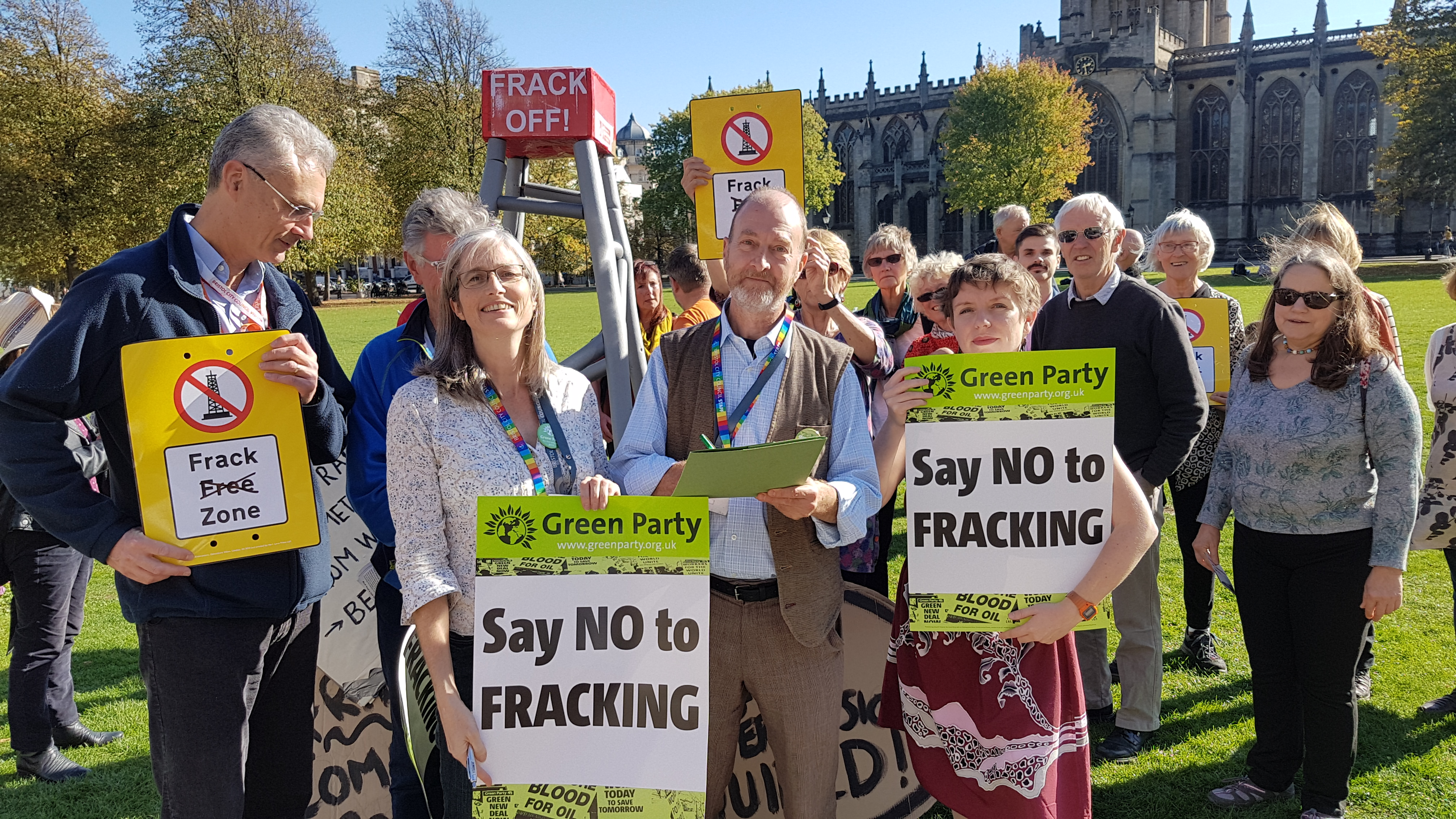
Green Party local councillors opposing fracking in 2018

Grow Heathrow is a land squat in Sipson, west London, on a site which might be demolished to build a new runway at Heathrow Airport. It was occupied in 2010 and partially evicted in 2019. Frack Off was set up in 2011, one of a number of groups set up in response to concerns about the safety of fracking and other forms of shale gas extraction. Following on from these groups, Extinction Rebellion was set up on 31 October 2018, after a letter was published in The Guardian voicing concerns about the ecological crisis which was signed by 94 scientists.

A series of protests by the group Insulate Britain involving traffic obstruction began on 13 September 2021. The group Tyre Extinguishers deflated the tyres of sport utility vehicles (SUVs) in cities around the UK in March and April 2022. The Just Stop Oil coalition of climate activism groups disrupted oil terminals across England for 12 days in April 2022. Throughout 2022 and 2023, Just Stop Oil have continued to protest, disrupting events and slow marching.

== High Speed 2 ==
High Speed 2 is a currently under construction high-speed railway network which will link London, Birmingham, Leeds and Manchester. According to the Woodland Trust, 108 sites of ancient woodland are under threat. The decision of the Department for Transport was that phase one, construction of a rail link from London to Birmingham, could begin on 15 April 2020. Four woodlands in Warwickshire were immediately destroyed, despite the recommended advice being to only carry out felling in autumn to minimise damage to flora and fauna. Environmental campaigners had already set up occupations along the route of the proposed train line. In January 2020, HS2 Limited began evicting a series of camps in the Colne Valley Regional Park which had been occupied since October 2017. Activists, including some connected to Extinction Rebellion and the Green Party had been monitoring the work on HS2 and contested the evictions, claiming that HS2 did not own the land. In May 2020, a squat in Harefield, west London was evicted.

== See also ==
- 38 Degrees
- Bright Green
- Civil disobedience
- Civil resistance
- Climate Rush
- Environmental movement#United Kingdom
- Environmentalism
- Frack Off
- Friends of the Earth (EWNI)
