= Roads for Prosperity =

Roads for Prosperity (often incorrectly called Road to Prosperity) was a controversial white paper published by the Conservative government in the United Kingdom in 1989; detailing the 'largest road building programme for the UK since the Romans' produced in response to rapid increases in car ownership and use over the previous decade. It embraced what Margaret Thatcher had described as 'the great car economy', although implementation led to widespread road protests, and many of the schemes contained within it were abandoned by 1996.

== Overview ==
The proposals included 500 road schemes at an estimated cost of £23 billion based on predicted traffic growth of 142% by 2025. It would have involved the doubling of the trunk road capacity with around 150 bypasses being built to meet the predicted demand. According to The Times, the road network expanded by 24,000 miles (38,624 km) between 1985-1995 and then by only 1.6% between 1996-2006; no definition of "the road network" is provided.

Schemes included the following:

- Widen the M25 motorway to dual 4 lanes (partially built)
- Widen the M1 motorway between the M25 and the M18 to dual 4 lanes (partially implemented)
- Build the new Newbury Bypass (built in the face of major protests)
- Build the new A46 Swainswick and A4 Batheaston by-passes east of the city of Bath including a vertical cutting dressed in Bath stone.
- Build the M11 Link Road, which became the A12 running from Hackney Wick to Wanstead and the Redbridge Roundabout in London, despite significant protests
- Extend the M3 past Winchester across Twyford Down (built in the face of major protests during the second half of the 1990s)

== See also ==
- Transport and the Environment
- Traffic in Towns – 1963 UK government report on traffic
