= David Croker =

David Croker (18 April 1932 – 2 July 2006) was a key participant in the public enquiries which preceded the building of the major stretch of the M3 motorway around Winchester in England. He came to national prominence as a vigorous and eloquent leader of the campaign to prevent the digging of a cutting through Twyford Down. In spite of legal challenges in the High Court and the European Court of Justice, the campaign ultimately failed to save the down, but it was a productive failure, which had a wide-ranging impact upon road planning nationally.

Croker's campaigning style was vigorous and passionate, but never sentimental and emotive. It was based upon meticulous research and cogent argument, and he drew upon his professional expertise, honed at IBM, in the technological management of transport issues.

In later years, he remained highly motivated by his environmental convictions and continued to campaign for a sustainable transport policy. In 1995, the year after the Twyford cutting opened to traffic, he advised a group of campaigners who were taking European legal action to stop construction of the Newbury bypass, another controversial road scheme. The same year, he wrote: "Today we would be able to stop what happened to Twyford Down. As it is, we are left with a ruined landscape, which we must continue to hold up as an example wherever else we fight a campaign. There must be no repeat. Let Twyford Down be the death throes of a discredited transport system."
