= Road protest in the United Kingdom =

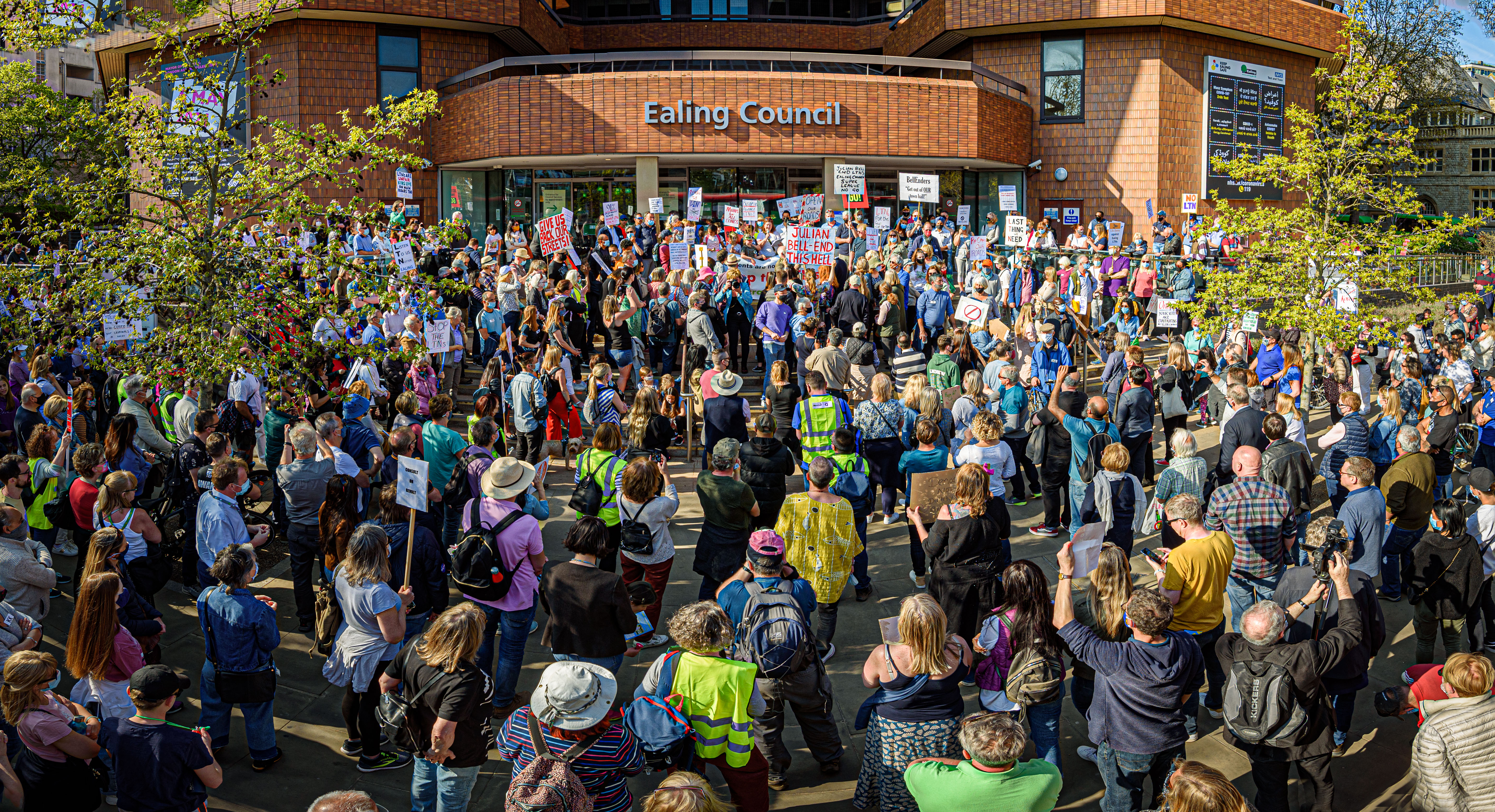
Protest against Low Traffic Neighbourhood policy, Ealing, London, 2021

Road protests in the United Kingdom usually occur as a reaction to a stated intention by the relevant authorities to build a new road, or to modify an existing road. Reasons for opposition to opening new roads include a desire to reduce air pollution and thus not wishing to incentivise increased or sustained car usage, and/or a desire to reduce or maintain low noise pollution by not having or increasing the use of motor vehicles in the area of the planned/proposed road. Protests may also be made by those wishing to see new roads built (particularly bypasses), changes made to existing roads, or against restricting their use by motor traffic.

== Motivation ==
Motivations have changed over time. Early actions, such as the response to the 1970s London urban motorway proposals, tended to be based on local environmental and social issues. Routing was contentious, while alternative schemes involving tunneling were generally not available because of the difficulty of planning an unobstructed route or on cost grounds. Surface-level urban motorways and junctions required large areas of land take, while visually intrusive elevated sections depressed house prices or introduced urban blight to wide areas. Socially, communities could be flattened or split in two with little access between them. Environmental considerations were not just focused on visual impact, but also noise and pollution—vehicle's emissions were not restricted at that time. Some of the local "NIMBY" issues could be mitigated through the scheme proposer making concessions to access and small changes to routing, while increasing the levels of compensation would sometimes quieten objections and smooth the passage of a public enquiry.

At that time more consideration was given to economic issues and how the effect on the community and the built environment could be mitigated—with schemes sometimes going so far as to relocate historic buildings affected by road schemes. Since the 1980s much wider social and environmental concerns have been called into question; policy changed to allow environmentalists to be increasingly involved over the loss of wildlife and its habitat. Since the 1990s there has been more research and awareness of induced demand and climate change, which are often now central to the arguments put up by some groups of protesters.

Early attempts to incorporate wider considerations have resulted in lengthy enquiries, with the result that circumstances change while costs escalate. By being much more general in nature, these latter issues can sometimes contrast with the specific local issues raised in a scheme. Because of their less specific nature, at times it has been difficult to address these broad issues within the scope of a public enquiry, which have frequently been restrained by public policy and attempts to speed up or "simplify" the process. Thus for many years environmental impact was not given as much weighting as the economic benefits quantified within a cost benefit analysis, while questions aimed at national economic models and traffic forecasts could not be addressed within the normal planning process.

Thus, while a road scheme may take a decade or two to work through the planning system, there would still be sections of society who would feel disenfranchised from the process. While protests were often seen at public enquiries in the 1970s and 1980s, some of the more recent protests have been characterised by civil disobedience at the construction site after the enquiry concluded.

== Methods ==
Early popular attempts to confront schemes generally attempted to work within the existing democratic planning and public enquiry system. The Westway enquiry in the early 1970s affected affluent inhabitants of West London who were able to afford representation by professional transport planners. Although they were unable to stop that road, their approach and questioning raised important issues that allowed some of the major policy assumptions to be queried, which subsequently resulted in the Greater London Council dropping their support of other London urban motorway schemes. It also changed the government's approach towards public enquiries.

Tactics have changed over time and have generally become less technical but more publicity-orientated and political. Initially the public enquiry would often be accompanied by a small group of local residents waving placards and shouting slogans. The Twyford Down M3 extension saw the first direct action protest camp, led by idealistic young people and a few ex-Greenham Common protesters. On occasion protests have led to changes in transport policy, planning process, policing techniques, and the law.

Recent protests have had supporters from not just the local area but diverse communities including New Age travellers, environmentalists, and the rural wealthy.

== History ==
=== 1950–1979 ===
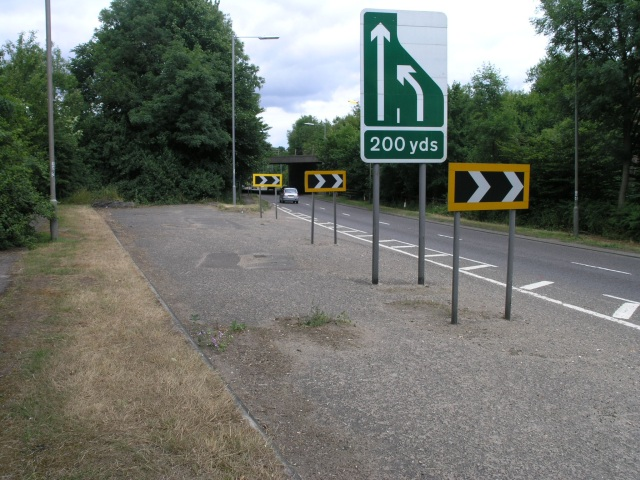
Uncompleted Motorway Junction on the M23 towards London. Work on London radial motorways stopped in the 1970s.

The first British motorway was opened in 1958 at a time when road building was central to all political party manifestos and viewed as critical infrastructure for the national economy.

However, as early as 1957, protests had already begun against the proposed route of the M1 motorway through the National Forest before the first motorway had even opened, with several alternative routes proposed with competing interests between protecting the National Forest (chosen route), cost and practicality (an additional 15 mile route to the west) and using prime farming land (Soar Valley route).

In 1963, a report on urban transport planning policy, Traffic in Towns, was produced for the UK Department of Transport by a team headed by the architect, civil engineer and planner Colin Buchanan, which proposed major reorganisation of towns to accommodate the motor car and lorry. It did however also provide clear messages about the damage that cars would cause and the need to limit growth of traffic:

The American policy of providing motorways for commuters can succeed, even in American conditions, only if there is a disregard for all considerations other than the free flow of traffic which seems sometimes to be almost ruthless. Our British cities are not only packed with buildings, they are also packed with history and to drive motorways through them on the American scale would inevitably destroy much that ought to be preserved.

Distasteful though we find the whole idea, we think that some deliberate limitation of the volume of motor traffic is quite unavoidable. The need for it just can't be escaped. Even when everything that it is possibly to do by way of building new roads and expanding public transport has been done, there would still be, in the absence of deliberate limitation, more cars trying to move into, or within our cities than could possibly be accommodated.

Over the following years governments and local authorities embarked on a large range of new road building projects, many of which had been considered but not necessarily recommended within the report over the coming years and decades. Buchanan later became president of the Council for the Protection of Rural England, noting that his report had often been misinterpreted as advocating unrestrained redevelopment.

In 1970, the Homes before Roads movement was formed to oppose plans for the London Ringways, which eventually led to the Greater London Council reversing its policy. There were protests when the Westway was being built. After this, protesters became more radical during the first enquiry into the widening of the Archway Road. Not only was the scheme questioned on technical grounds, but the inquiry was disrupted at intervals. A total of four public inquiries were held between the 1970s and 1990s before this scheme was finally dropped.

Subsequent government policy ensured that new road building could not be undertaken unless it was in accordance with local Strategic Plans. Once firmed up, the basis of these schemes could not be questioned in an enquiry and many plans for the regional trunk network and inter-urban road network were approved at this stage without major interruption. However, political considerations sometime meant that ministerial decisions to proceed with contentious road schemes were deferred. Thus schemes like the East London River Crossing were approved by the enquiry inspector but dragged on through the 1980s and 1990s as they were sent back to another inquiry before being dropped by the minister.

=== 1979–1997 ===
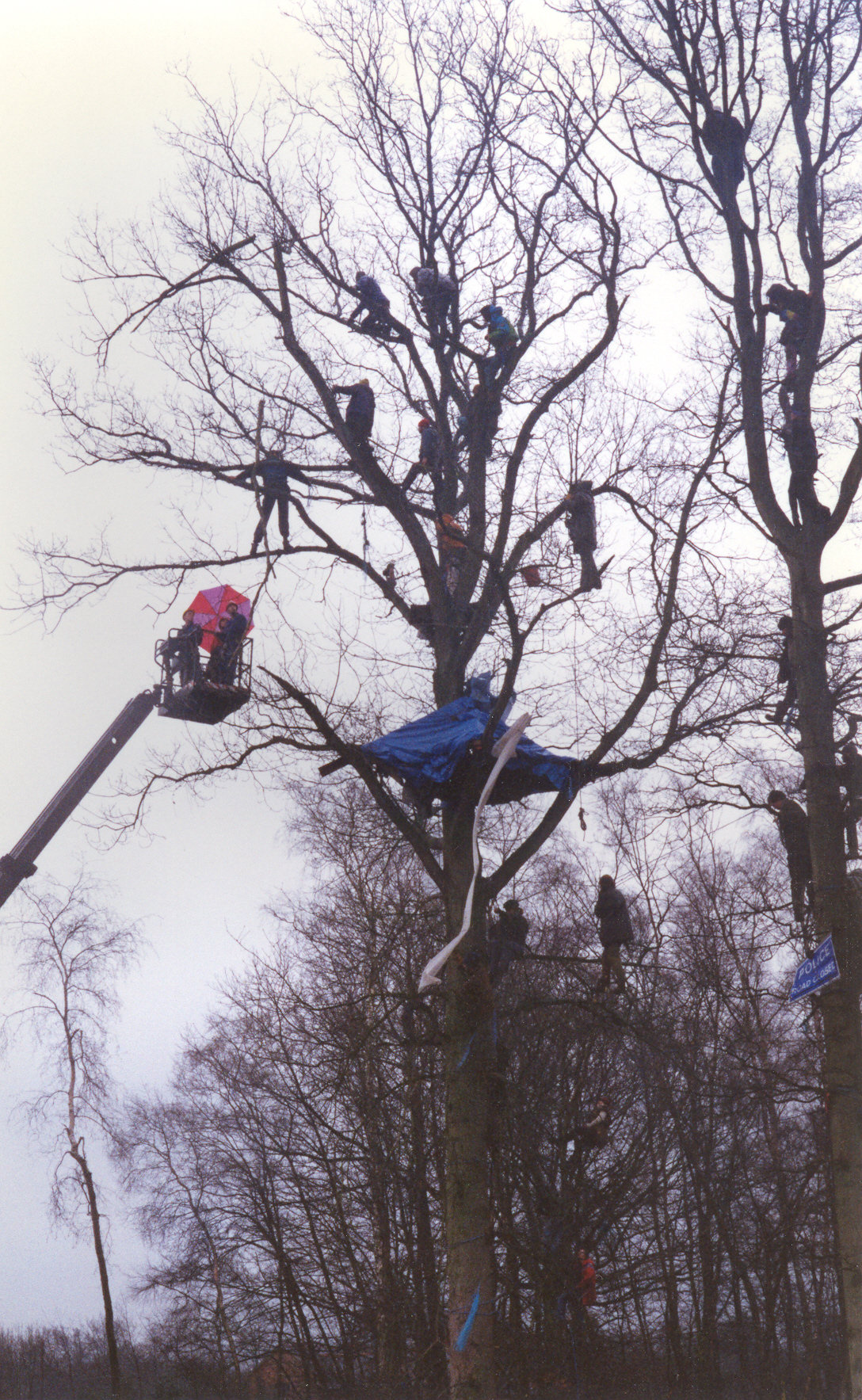
Eviction of the Tot Hill camp, Newbury bypass, 1996

In 1989, the Government of Margaret Thatcher launched proposals for a trunk road enlargement programme, outlined in the Roads for Prosperity white paper (often incorrectly referred to as 'Roads to Prosperity'). The stated aims of the proposals were to assist economic growth, improve the environment, and improve road safety. The 10-year programme was estimated to cost of £23 billion (1989 prices), with 2,700 miles (4,300 km) of new or improved road to the trunk road network and 150 new bypasses. The benefits of each scheme within the programme would need to be validated through a thorough financial assessment and planning process in accordance with HM Treasury's Green Book.

In 1991, John Stewart and others formed Alarm UK! to act as a central, umbrella organisation which supplied local groups with information on transport, environmental and campaigning matters and to stage occasional nationwide stunts (including a "Stop That Road Week"). Direct action protests started at the construction site at Twyford Down in 1992. Although the route of cuttings had been diverted as a result of earlier representations in the planning process, proposals for a more environmentally sympathetic tunnel had been rejected on cost grounds. Action at Twyford sparked the M11 link road protest in 1993, Solsbury Hill in 1994 and others in Glasgow and Lancashire and elsewhere.

In 1992, the Earth Summit reported concern at rising levels of carbon dioxide emissions which was seen by the UK government as a sufficient risk to justify precautionary measures.

Work on the M3 extension was met by continued disruption to the works and on several occasions protesters received prison sentences for refusing to be bound over, or for breaking court injunctions. One protester, Rebecca Lush, who had been sent to Holloway prison for two weeks in 1992 for breaking an injunction not to return to the protest site was visited by European commissioner for the environment and later, in 1998, Lush and others successfully challenged the UK Government’s Breach of the Peace legislation at the European Court of Justice.

In 1993, plans for an East London River Crossing that would have cut through Oxleas Wood in southeast London were withdrawn following opposition from local residents. People Against the River Crossing, the protest group formed to oppose the crossing, comprised local residents, established environmental organisations, radical environmentalists and pagans. Over 3,000 people and organisations signed a pledge in which they promised to engage in civil disobedience to defend the woodland.

In 1994, the year that the contentious M3 extension at Twyford Down was opened, the Royal Commission on Environmental Pollution, comprising some of Britain's top scientists, published a report, Transport and the Environment that expressed concern about the consequences of further large-scale growth in road traffic, called expenditure on motorways and trunk roads to be reduced to about half its present level and for real investment in alternative transport modes. Also in 1994, SACTRA (The Standing Advisory Committee on Trunk Road Assessment) produced evidence, that for congested roads, the predicted journey time benefits from increased capacity were generally reduced by induced demand, although typically the net benefits would still be positive. Both the main opposition parties (Labour and Liberal Democrat) adopted policies which promised a focusing instead on Transportation Demand Management. The Criminal Justice Act became law and created a series of new offences including peaceful protest Stephen Norris was replaced by Brian Mawhinney as secretary for transport.

In 1995, the Newbury bypass was given the go-ahead in July by Brian Mawhinney half an hour before he resigned, a month after the final protesters had been evicted from the M11 camp. The Newbury bypass was built during 1996 in the face of stiff resistance with over 1,000 people arrested and a policing bill of £26 million.

In November 1995, 300 road schemes were canceled leaving schemes costing £6b as detailed in the November budget that year.

=== 1997–present ===
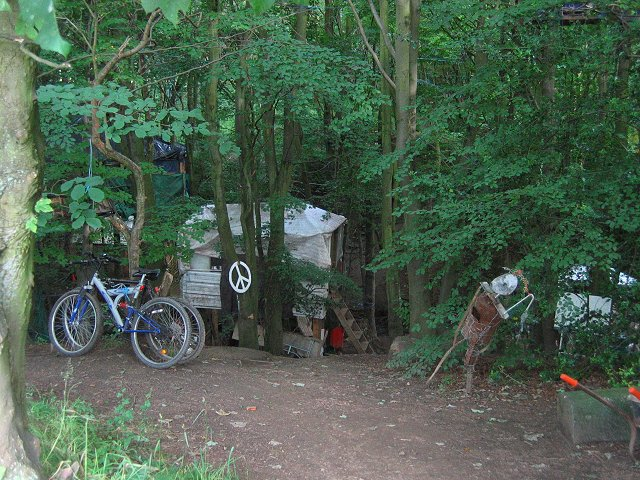
Road protest, Bilston Glen, Scotland

The incoming Labour government in 1997 cancelled the remaining road schemes and committed to an integrated transport system, as described in their white paper A new deal for transport: better for everyone and the protesters disbanded.

In 2002, the government proposed a new major road-building programme with 360 miles (580 km) of the strategic road network to be widened, 80 major new trunk road schemes to improve safety, and 100 new bypasses on trunk and local roads.

Many protesters from the earlier protests re-organised and in 2004 a number of veterans from the Tywford Down protest visited the Department for Transport to warn of a new campaign of direct action in response to the claimed 200 new road-building proposals in the government's recently unveiled 10-year transport plan. They delivered a letter and a D Lock as a symbol of the past protests.

Rebecca Lush founded Road Block to support a growing number of protests around the country in 2005 which became part of the bus and rail advocacy group Campaign for Better Transport (UK) in 2007. Lush the cosmetics company started to publicly support transport related and other protest groups, introduced the 'Charity Pot' to support small campaign groups, such as NoM1Widening and introduced a product line called 'Go Green', that they said was inspired by Rebecca Lush (no relation).

In February 2007, journalist Mick Hume argued in The Times for renewed road building, pointing out that only 150 miles (240 km) had been built from 1995 to 2005 and that motorways account for "barely 1 per cent" of Britain's roads.

Friends of the Earth and others campaigned against the 2007 Planning Bill intended to speed up the approval of "projects for the development of nationally significant infrastructure" and "provision about town and country planning" which they believed would erode democratic rights.

The Public Order Act 2023 introduced new offences including "locking on", interfering with key national infrastructure, obstructing major transport works, causing serious disruption by tunnelling, greater stop and search powers to prevent disruptive protests.

== See also ==
=== General ===
- Alternatives to car use – Transport modes other than cars or trucks
- Car-free movement – Movement to reduce the use of private vehicles
- Cycling infrastructure – Facilities for use by cyclists
- Environmental direct action in the United Kingdom
- Environmental Protection UK – UK non-governmental organisation
- Freeway and expressway revolts – Protest against new highways & freeways
- Fuel protest – Protests about cost of fuel for road vehicles
- 15-minute city – Urban accessibility concept
- List of road protests in the UK and Ireland
- The Hitchhiker's Guide to the Galaxy – Science fiction series , which use a UK road protest as a plot device
- Pedestrian zone – Urban car-free area reserved for pedestrian use

=== Protest groups ===
- Dongas road protest group – Protest group in England
- Reclaim the Streets – Advocacy group for community ownership of public spaces
- Earth First! – Environmental advocacy group
- World Carfree Network – International social movement organization
- Extinction Rebellion – Environmental pressure group
