= Rising Tide UK =

- Formation: 2000
- Type: Environmental movement
- Purpose: Climate justice; opposition to fossil fuel extraction and infrastructure
- Location: United Kingdom
- Region served: United Kingdom
- Methods: Direct action; grassroots organising; protests; occupations
- Website: risingtide.org.uk

Rising Tide UK is the United Kingdom part of the International Rising Tide Network, both of which were created in 2000 to carry out direct action against the root causes of climate change, and to work towards a fossil fuel free future. RTUK takes a no-compromise position and believes that only the complete dismantling of the fossil fuel industry and a shift to low consumption lifestyles will be sufficient to halt climate change.

Rising Tide UK is formed of regional and local groups in the UK, and supports networks of similar groups around the country. Actions carried out by Rising Tide UK groups range from protests and street-theatre style events, to mass occupations of petrol stations, and blockades of key fossil fuel industrial sites.

== Key values and goals ==
Rising Tide specifically argue against mechanisms such as Carbon Trading and many other elements of the ‘Clean Development Mechanisms’ which were a key part of the Kyoto Protocol. It shares the view of many other environmentalist groups that these market-based mechanisms are ‘False Solutions’ that allow Northern companies to continue to emit green house gasses while gaining access to new markets in ‘Carbon Sinks’ in the South. RT UK specifically advocates an immediate 60% drop in global emissions, leading to a 90% drop, and argues that mechanisms such as Carbon Trading preclude such a drop.

In 2007 Rising Tide UK adopted the ‘Peoples' Global Action Hallmarks’ as a way to clarify its position and values beyond its main aims of tackling climate change. Among other things these hallmarks enshrine a "rejection of capitalism, imperialism and feudalism" and "destructive globalisation", and the rejection of "patriarchy, racism and religious fundamentalism". They promote a confrontational (rather than lobbying-based) position toward government, a focus on direct action and civil disobedience, and a decentralised and autonomous organisation.

== History and key actions ==
=== Origins (2000) and political statement ===
Rising Tide UK and the International Rising Tide Network are a significant part of a wider environmental and social justice movement that started to crystallise in the new millennium, fuelled by increasing concern about climate change and the inaction of governments to deal with it. Rising Tide formed around a political statement written by a coalition of groups who came together in November 2000 to organise protests and events at the United Nations Climate Conference of Parties (COP6) in The Hague. COP6 was the 6th UN conference on climate change, which ended up collapsing over US proposals for Carbon Sinks in order to avoid reducing its emissions.

The Rising Tide political statement defined the group's initial position, and allowed an international network to develop around its shared purpose. At an international Rising Tide meeting in Barcelona in February 2002, the statement was updated and re-written. In 2011 the statement is once again being re-drafted to adapt to changing political circumstances and set out an analysis that is shared by all groups in the international network.

=== Campaign against fossil fuel companies' sponsorship of public institutions ===
Key targets of this campaign have been oil sponsorship of museums in London such as the Tate museums and the National Portrait Gallery's annual Portrait Award, and the London 2012 olympics. In 2008, campaigning from Art Not Oil, Rising Tide UK and other organisations helped persuade London's Natural History Museum to cancel its "Wildlife Photographer of the Year" sponsorship deal with Shell.

=== Canadian Tar Sands Campaign (2010 onwards) ===
In 2010 RTUK started working with a few key partners, such as the UK Tar Sands Network and the Canada-based Indigenous Environmental Network, against companies involved in oil extraction in the Canadian tar sands. Tar sands extraction has been linked to massive water pollution, freshwater depletion, increased cancer rates among local communities, land rights issues and the wholesale destruction of large areas of forests in Canada. These issues, alongside the increased carbon emissions involved in tar sands extraction have led them to dubbed "the most destructive project on Earth".

RTUK has focused on the increased involvement of UK-based oil companies, BP and Shell. In 2010 they were involved in organising actions to engage the public about tar sands – such as a "Save Canada" mission to Trafalgar Square's Canada Day celebrations – and supported protests and an anti-tar sands shareholder resolution at the BP AGM.

=== Blockade of Ffos-y-Fran Coal mine ===
One of the most successful Rising Tide UK actions of recent years was Rising Tide Bristol's blockading of the single train line that transports coal from the Ffos-y-fran Land Reclamation Scheme. Ffos-y-Fran is one of the largest open pit coal mines in Europe, and operates very close to the houses of the local community in Merthyr Tydfil, which have been campaigning against it.

On 26 April 2010, a group of Rising Tide activists locked on to the train tracks and thus stopped the mine from being able to send out coal. After four hours, the police removed and arrested this group, at which point a second concealed group made themselves known and also locked on. By the end of the day no coal had been able to leave the mine, and 18 people were arrested. Initial charges of Obstruction of the Railway with Intent, which carries a maximum sentence of life, have been dropped. 13 then pleaded guilty to a lesser charge of Obstruction of the Railway, while all charges against 5 others were dropped.

=== Crude Awakening ===
In October 2010 Rising Tide was one of the groups involved in organising around The Crude Awakening mass action, which blockaded the Coryton Oil Refinery in Essex – the largest refinery in England – for over 7 hours. The action attracted more than 500 people, and in an attempt to outmanoeuvre the police utilised a new tactic of keeping the location secret to the participants until they were on their way to it, a tactic experimented with on Rising Tide actions earlier in the year.

== Key associated groups ==
=== Art not Oil ===
Art Not Oil was set up in 2004 by London Rising Tide, and while it became independent of LRT in around 2008, it has worked in close collaboration with it and the wider national network since then. It encourages artistic works that confront oil companies, the damage they cause, and encourages arts institutions that take sponsorship from them to decline such support. In 2010 it produced a desk diary featuring some of the most powerful work from its 7 years of existence. It now collaborates closely with two new groups campaigning on similar terrain: Liberate Tate and PLATFORM's Licence to Spill.

=== Climate Camps ===
RTUK activities helped to pave the way for the wave of climate action that emerged in the UK in 2005 and generated the high-profile Camps for Climate Action, the first of which was at Drax power station in 2006. RTUK and its members have since been closely involved with Climate Camp and their activities, including the 2007 Heathrow Camp which contributed to the 2010 decision to scrap airport expansion at Heathrow.

=== Greenwash Guerrillas ===
The Greenwash Guerillas are a spin-off group and a role that Rising Tide groups frequently don to highlight the issue of 'greenwash' – PR efforts by polluters to make themselves look more environmentally friendly or paint themselves in a positive light. Greenwash Guerilla actions frequently involve a mixture of direct action and street-theatre, with participants dressed as hazard teams with fake instruments 'detecting' greenwash at polluters' meetings or events.
