= Grow Heathrow =

Land squat in west London

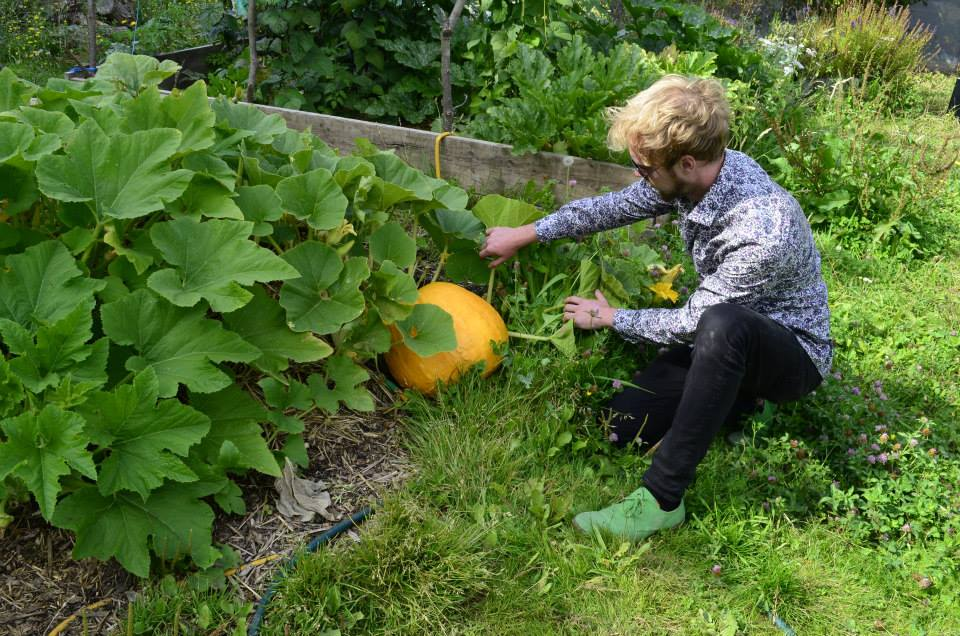
- Growing pumpkins

- Location within Greater London

General information
- Status: Evicted
- Location: Vineries Close, Sipson, West Drayton UB7 0JH London
- Coordinates: 51.4900715°N 0.4580583°W
- Opened: 1 March 2010
- Closed: 8 March 2021

Website
- Archived 27 June 2016 at the Wayback Machine

Grow Heathrow was a land squat and community garden in Sipson, west London. It was occupied in 2010 by local people concerned about the possibility of the expansion of Heathrow Airport. It was part of the Transition Network. Half of the site was evicted in 2019 and the other half was evicted in 2021.

== Community ==
Around twenty people lived at Grow Heathrow. The squat was off-grid and low carbon. Electricity came from solar panels and wind turbines. There was a meadow with allotments which were used by both residents and local people. There were also three large greenhouses.

The project stated four main aims:

- To further the Heathrow villages as an iconic symbol of community resistance to the economic, ecological and democratic crises.
- To develop and promote community and resource autonomy to support long-term community resilience
- To establish replicable structures of organisation, which could provide a model for future non-hierarchical, consensus-based communities.
- To root the grassroots radical values of the 3rd runway resistance in the Heathrow villages for the long term

== Legal struggles ==
Alongside four other squats, the project was raided by the Metropolitan Police 24 hours before the 2011 Royal Wedding. There were no arrests.

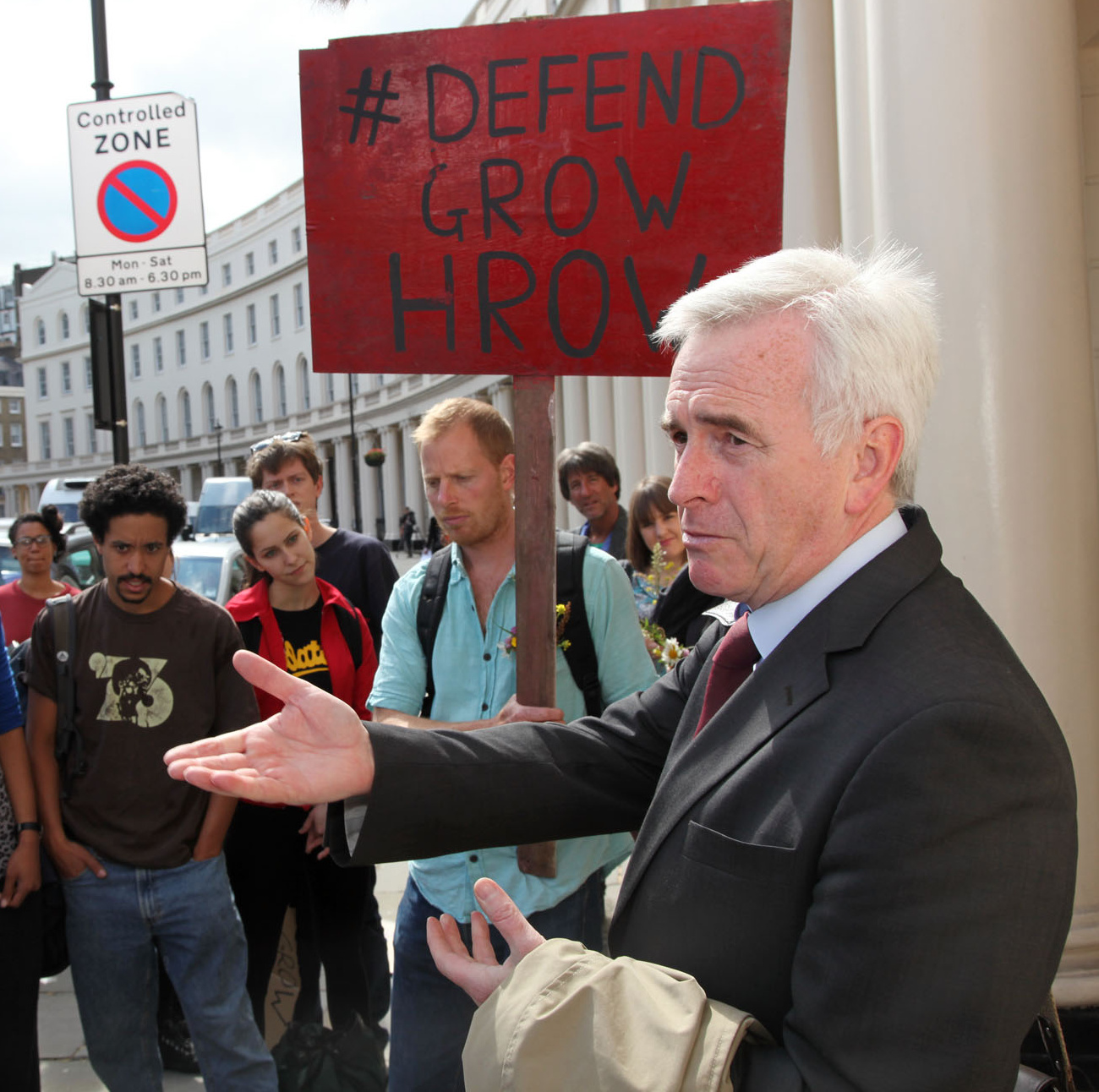
John McDonnell supporting Grow Heathrow at court

Over four years after the occupation the owners, Lewdown Holdings Limited, took legal action on 23 September 2014 at Uxbridge County Court. The owner was granted possession and the project successfully resisted bailiffs in 2015. Grow Heathrow launched an appeal against eviction which lasted into 2016.

During its legal struggles, Grow Heathrow was supported by the local MP for Hayes and Harlington and Shadow Chancellor of the Exchequer John McDonnell who said in 2017 “We need lawful spaces of protest with the values of education and community embedded in them; Grow Heathrow would be a great loss for my constituency in this crucial campaign year against Heathrow airport’s expansion.”

== Eviction ==
In February 2019, the project made an urgent callout for support after losing a court case. An eviction attempt began on 26 February, which resulted in half the project being evicted and half remaining.

On the 8th of March 2021, another call for support against eviction was made. This eviction successfully displaced the remaining occupation, ending Grow Heathrow.
