= Newbury bypass =

Stretch of dual carriageway road which bypasses the town of Newbury in England

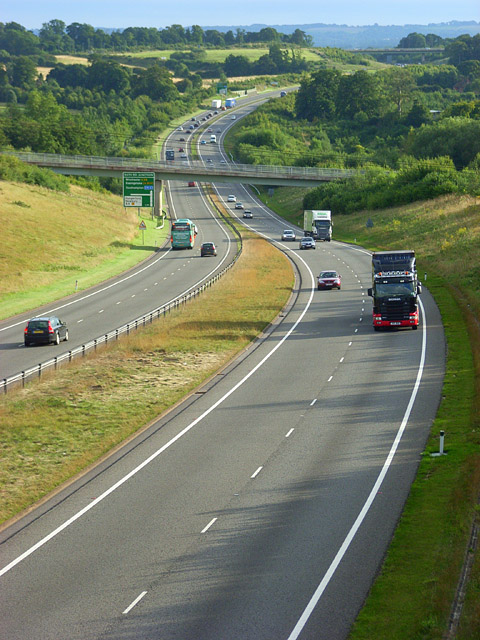
The Newbury bypass near Donnington

The Newbury bypass, officially The Winchester–Preston Trunk Road (A34) (Newbury Bypass), is a 9-mile (14 km) stretch of dual carriageway road which bypasses the town of Newbury in Berkshire, England. It is located to the west of the town and forms part of the A34 road. It opened in 1998.

Between January 1996 and April 1996 the clearance of approximately 360 acres (150 ha) of land including 120 acres (49 ha) of woodland, and the felling of nearly 10,000 mature trees to make way for the construction of the road, led to some of the largest anti-road protests in European history. Around 7,000 people demonstrated on the site of the bypass route in some way and over 800 arrests were made. The cost of policing the protest (known as "Operation Prospect" and run jointly by Thames Valley Police and Hampshire Constabulary) had reached approximately £5 million by December 1996. An additional £30 million was spent on private security guards, security fencing, and security lighting while the works were in progress, of which only £7 million was budgeted for in the original contract.

The protest was known in some quarters as the "Third Battle of Newbury", a name which was also adopted by one of the main protest groups. The name was chosen in reference to the English Civil War battles that took place close to the town in 1643 and 1644.

== Proposals ==
Newbury has been on the route of north–south traffic across the River Kennet since the medieval period. A bridge on the site of the current Town Bridge has existed since at least the 14th century and the current bridge dates from 1772. As long ago as World War II this north–south traffic was considered to be of sufficient strategic importance that a second temporary bridge, the American Bridge, was built in case the Town Bridge was destroyed in an air raid. The American Bridge continued in use until it was replaced in 2001, but post-war traffic increases meant that the town centre and its bridges needed by-passing.

The first Newbury bypass was built in 1963; however, by the 1980s this in turn proved insufficient to cope with the huge volume of traffic travelling through the Newbury area. In 1981 a new road to be built to the west of Newbury, mainly following the path of the disused Didcot, Newbury and Southampton Railway railway line, was proposed to bypass the town centre. This route was very controversial because it ran through three Sites of Special Scientific Interest: Snelsmore Common plus the Rivers Lambourn and Kennet; Penn Wood which was part of the North Wessex Downs AONB (Area of Outstanding Natural Beauty); the English Heritage registered battlefield site of the first Battle of Newbury during the English Civil War in 1643; and The Chase, a National Trust nature reserve. It was also found that areas of the proposed bypass route were home to a rare snail, known as Desmoulin's whorl snail.

A public inquiry into the plans was held in 1988, which found in favour of the road. Opponents argued that the decision was flawed and possibly illegal as there was no environmental impact assessment — a legal requirement incorporated into British law two weeks after the start of the 1988 public enquiry. However, the inquiry decision was made in accordance with legislation at the time. The plans were passed in a closed session of Parliament, after a pro forma hearing, which opponents criticised as a "lack of democracy".

The road was originally approved for construction to begin in 1994. However, the then Secretary of State for Transport, Brian Mawhinney, announced that it would be delayed pending a further review. On 5 July 1995 Mawhinney announced that the building of the road was to proceed, and then resigned half an hour later.

== Protests ==
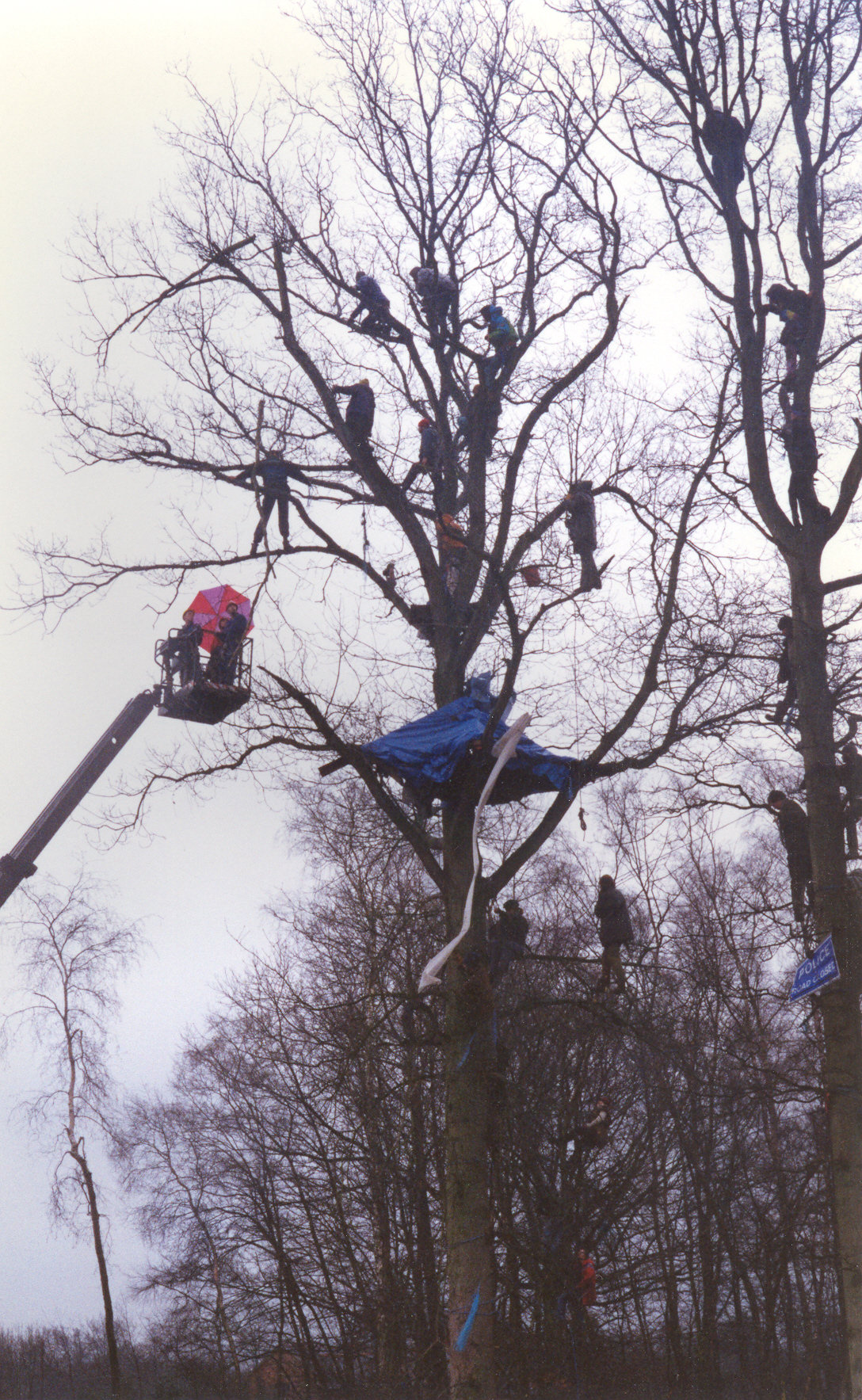
Eviction of the Tot Hill camp, February 1996

The bypass led to immense protests in an attempt to halt the felling of trees (including mature oak, ash, and beech) and the start of building work. A number of protesters were veterans from the Twyford Down protests over the building of the M3 motorway. Others were students, unemployed people, part-time workers and people taking time off from work to protest. In 1994, a local comprehensive school teacher, Helen Anscombe, founded "The Third Battle of Newbury", an umbrella group of organisations against the bypass. The name actually came from a meeting held by local townspeople and was the suggestion of a name by a local historian who cared deeply that the battlefields of the Civil War stayed safe to visitors.

Although the majority of local residents were in favour of building the bypass, a sizeable minority were against it. A protest group of local businesses opposed to the building of the road was formed, which named itself "CAMBUS". The split of opinion in and around Newbury concerning the building of the road was regularly demonstrated in the lively debate seen in the letters page of the local newspaper, the Newbury Weekly News.

Clearance work began on 2 August 1995 when bulldozers demolished six empty buildings in the path of the bypass – three houses, a railway signal box, a lodge at Mary Hare Grammar School for deaf children and a prefabricated church near Snelsmore Common.

From July 1995 protesters began to occupy the land that was scheduled for clearance, a tactic known as tree sitting, in an effort to stop the felling of trees. Many lived in tree houses, which were also known as "twigloos", while others occupied home-made tents on the ground made from hazel branches covered with tarpaulin known as "benders".

The first camp was at Snelsmore Common. Around September 1995 a further encampment grew up alongside the Kennet and Avon Canal and the River Kennet. Around October 1995 protesters set up a third encampment at Reddings Copse. By December 1995 there were three further camps at The Chase, Elmore Plantation and Rack Marsh on the River Lambourn. Protesters in many of the camps claimed squatters rights through use of a Section 6 notice.

Another method used by protesters to stop the clearance work was the digging of tunnels, a tactic borrowed from the Viet Cong. A network of tunnels 10 feet (3 m) down was dug at Snelsmore Common in the belief that heavy machinery would not drive over them in case they collapsed, burying the protesters inside.

Evictions of the protest camps, tree felling and undergrowth clearance work begin on 9 January 1996 and conflicts between security guards and protesters were widely reported in the British media. By the following month the number of protesters had increased and there were more than 20 camps along the route of the bypass, with names such as "Skyward", "Rickety Bridge", "Granny Ash", "Quercus Circus", "Sea View", "Babble Brook", "Radical Fluff", "Pixie Village" and "Heartbreak Hotel". Peter Faulding was called in by the authorities to plan and safely remove the environmental protesters from a network of tunnels along the proposed route of the Newbury Bypass.

A firm specialising in industrial rope access, Richard Turner Ltd, was hired to provide climbers to evict protesters from the trees. Professional climbers condemned the actions of the company, questioning the safety of the procedures they were using. They presented the company with a special "downside" award at the first British Mountain Festival held at Llandudno on 17 February 1996. Andy MacNae of the British Mountaineering Council said "Climbers have an enviable environmental record, and the vast majority will be outraged at being associated with actions of this kind." Climber and writer Jim Perrin said "If we, as a community, do not disown and ostracise these mercenaries and renegades, we are undermining the reason for our own existence and helping accelerate the destruction of places we hold most dear".

On Monday 29 January there was a public meeting at the Waterside Centre in Newbury organised jointly by Friends of the Earth and the Green Party to promote the Road Traffic Reduction Bill. At the meeting, environmentalist and broadcaster Dr David Bellamy addressed the crowd of around 400 people and voiced his opposition to the building of the bypass.

On 15 February 1996 around 5,000 people from around the UK marched for 2 miles (3 kilometres) along the route from the largest camp at Snelsmore Common to Bagnor in objection to the road. Environmentalists claimed that this was the largest ever single demonstration against road-building in Britain. Two of the marchers were the television presenters Johnny Morris and Maggie Philbin, who lived nearby. The protest was peaceful and there were no arrests.

A national poll published in the Newbury Weekly News (10 March 1996) found that 53% of respondents thought that "work should stop immediately to allow time for alternatives to be tried".

Despite the protests, site clearance and road construction proceeded under heavy security provided by the Thames Valley Police led by the Assistant Chief Constable Ian Blair, the Hampshire Constabulary, and private security firms. The road was eventually finished after thirty-four months in November 1998 and now provides a high-speed section of the A34. It cost £104 million, against an original contract price of £74 million. The Highways Agency blamed the cost blow-out on the protesters.

== Construction ==
Much of the aggregate used in the by-pass was from the decommissioned RAF Greenham Common. The runway, once one of the largest in Europe was broken up and removed (except for one centre section) as part of the effort to return the common to its former state.

The concrete structures on the bypass received the Concrete Society's Overall Award for Outstanding Structures in 1999.

Following the extensive protests over the construction of the road, environmental concerns became much more of an important issue to civil engineers. The Newbury bypass itself was built with extra environmental features in an attempt to reduce the impact of the road.

The Desmoulin's whorl snail colony, previously located at Rack Marsh in Bagnor, was moved to another location to allow construction of the road to go ahead. However, in July 2006 it was reported that the species had become locally extinct at the new site.

== Outcome ==
Due to the cost of policing the Newbury Bypass construction, the UK Government abandoned construction plans for a further 77 bypasses across the country.

Analysis since the construction of the bypass has shown that instead of the predicted 47% reduction in road deaths due to the new road, there was a 67% increase (from 6 to 10) in the five years after it opened. However, the total number of casualties fell by 32% (from 455 to 311).

The same report concluded that the levels of traffic on the old road had not fallen as much as might have been expected, possibly because of traffic being able to use it for other reasons. In 2006, the Highways Agency defended the scheme from allegations by the Campaign to Protect Rural England that traffic had returned to previous levels: the Highways Agency's rejoinder being that the road had reduced traffic problems in the town.

In January 2016, a BBC magazine article commemorating the events of 20 years earlier showed 200,000 new trees starting to mature and the mutual respect but not affection between the former protagonists. One of the protesters, Rebecca Lush (since working for the Campaign for Better Transport) claimed the protest had enabled the incoming Labour government to look at alternatives to building more roads.

== Cultural references ==
Musician and activist Julian Cope was a frequent visitor to the camps and would document many of the protesters struggles in his album Interpreter.

The English band New Model Army commemorated the conflict in its song "Snelsmore Wood".

== See also ==
- Road protest in the United Kingdom
- Twyford Down
- M11 link road protest
- Fairmile
- Swampy

== Reading ==
- Evans, Kate, (1998), Copse: The Cartoon Book of Tree Protesting. Orange Dog Productions. ISBN 0-9532674-0-7
- Hindle, Jim, (2006) Nine Miles: Two Winters of Anti-Road Protest.
- Merrick (1996), Battle for the Trees. Godhaven Ink. ISBN 0-9529975-0-9
- Road Alert! (1997), Road Raging: Top Tips for Wrecking Roadbuilding.
- Styles, Peter, (2008) Birds, Booze & Bulldozers. ISBN 978 0-9554634-5-7
