= Twyford Down =

Hill in the United Kingdom

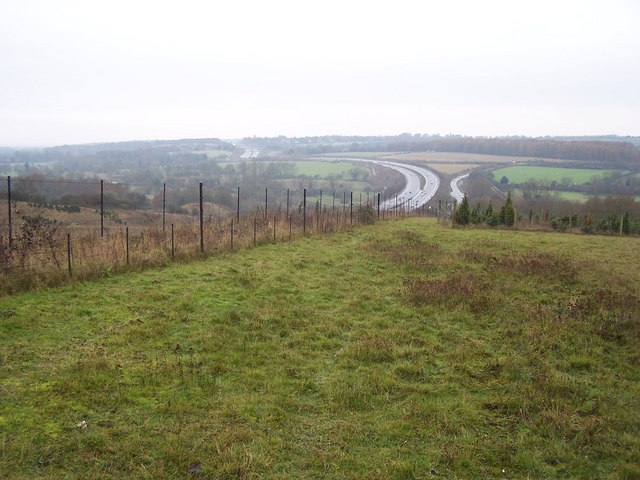
- Twyford Down in November 2005, with the M3 in the background

Highest point
- Elevation: 142 m (466 ft)
- Coordinates: 51°02′41″N 1°16′47″W

Geography
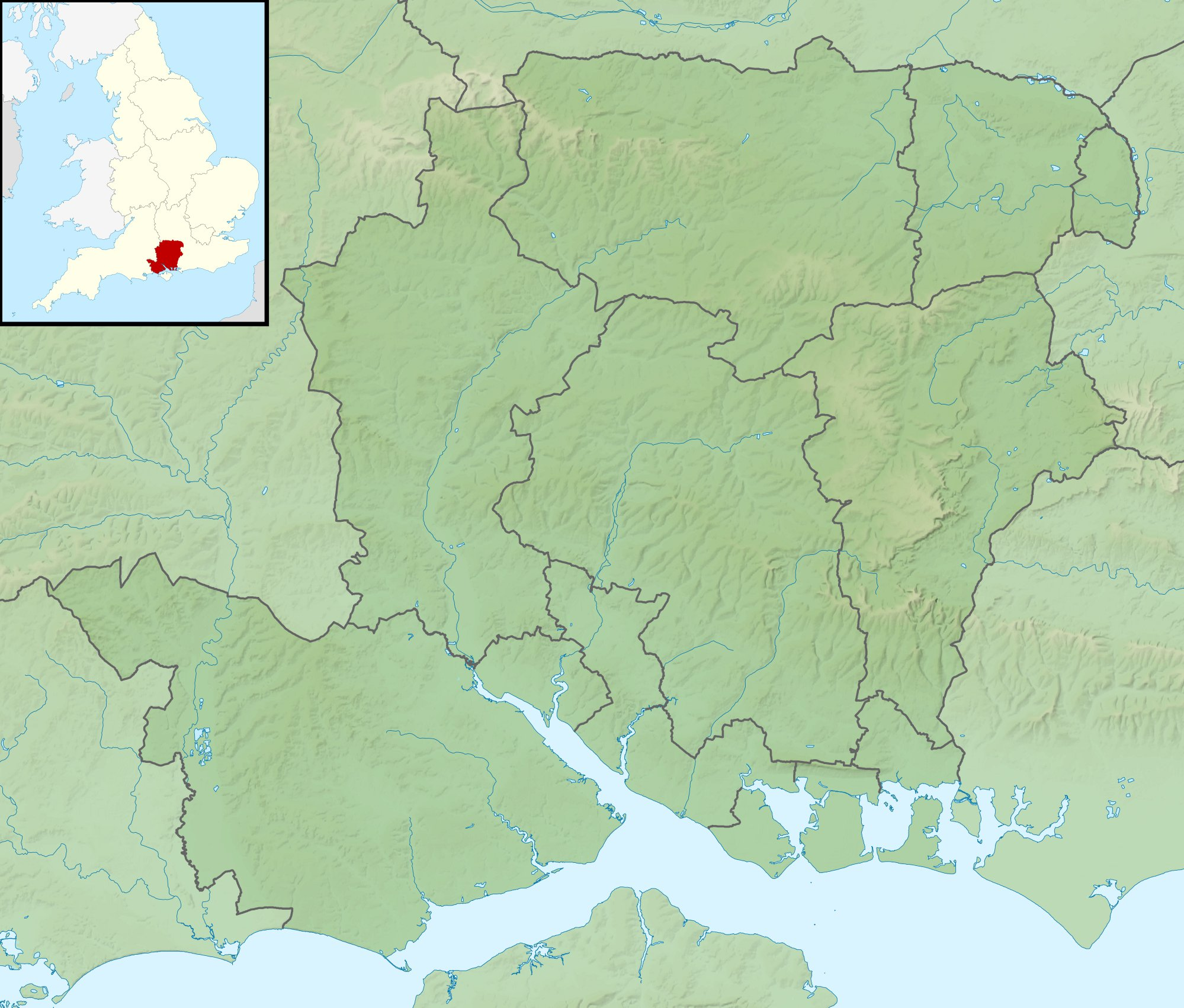
- Location within Hampshire
- Location: South Downs, England
- OS grid: SU506275
- Topo map: OS Landranger 185

Twyford Down is an area of chalk downland lying directly to the southeast of Winchester, Hampshire, England next to St. Catherine's Hill and close to the South Downs National Park. It has been settled since pre-Roman times, and has housed a fort and a chapel, as well as being a 17th and 18th century coaching route.

In 1992, the down was the site of a major road protest against a section of the M3 motorway from London to the south coast of England. There had been plans since the 1970s to replace the 1930s Winchester bypass which was regularly congested due to design features that had become out of date. This was problematic owing to the lack of available land between Winchester College and St. Catherine's Hill. After several public inquiries, particularly with using the water meadows near the college, a route was chosen that took the motorway over the down in a cutting. Although protests against the M3 had been ongoing since the early 1970s, the protest-action on top of the down, described in 1994 as the most controversial British motorway project ever to start construction, attracted a wider range of classes of people than had previously been the case, and caused a violent clash with onsite security officers.

The motorway was completed as planned and provides a link of continuous motorway between Greater London and the South Coast ports. Nevertheless, the protests attracted interest from the national media, and drew attention to this form of campaigning. Subsequent road schemes took greater account of the environment or were cancelled. Several protesters at Twyford Down subsequently formed campaign groups, or joined existing ones such as the Campaign for Better Transport.

== History ==
Twyford Down sits to the southeast of Winchester and the northeast of Twyford, and is part of the Winchester-East Meon Anticline. The down's 142-metre (466 ft) summit, known as Deacon Hill, is towards the north-eastern edge of the area which is renowned for its dramatic rolling scenery and ecologically rich grassland. Its history can be traced back to pre-Roman times. Along it run a series of trackways known as "dongas", which resulted from farmers herding animals to surrounding markets. St Catherine's Hill, in the centre of the down has been identified as a human settlement more than 3,000 years ago and pre-dates the foundation of Winchester. In the 3rd century, a fort was constructed on the hill, while in the 12th, a Norman chapel was constructed on the site. During the Middle Ages, paths along the down formed part of the Pilgrim's Trail from Winchester to Normandy via Portsmouth. This is commemorated by the modern Pilgrims' Trail which crosses the down.

In 1675, John Ogilby noted that the main coaching route from London to Southampton ran over the top of the down, going directly from Alresford to Twyford, avoiding Winchester. This remained the main coaching route until about 1800, when an alternative route via Winchester (now mostly the A31 and former A33) was formed. During this time, and up to the 19th century, the area was sometimes known as Morestead Down after the nearby village of Morestead.

Hockley Golf Club was established as a private members' club on the down in 1914.

== The M3 motorway extension ==
=== Background ===
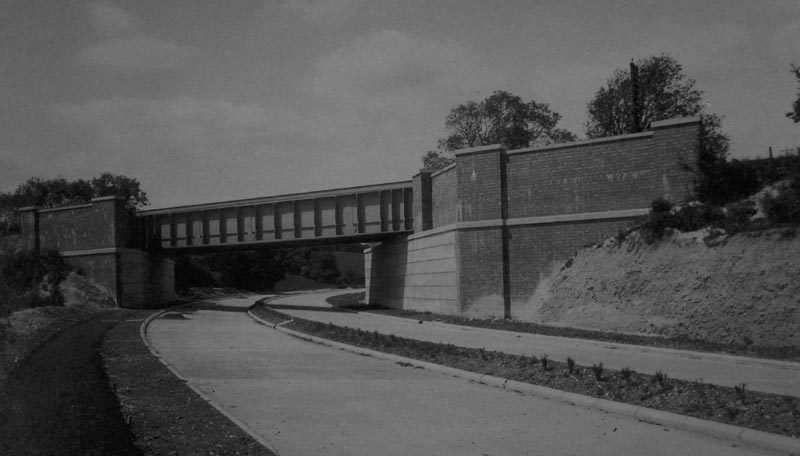
The original A33 Winchester Bypass, designed to 1930s standards, was unsuitable for modern traffic.

Outline strategic planning for the route of what was to be later known as the M3 motorway had begun in the late 1930s. The route was to link London to Basingstoke, in order to reduce the pressure on the A30. Detailed planning for the first phase of construction, a 40 miles (64 km) section, between Sunbury on Thames and Popham, began in 1962-3. The 26 miles (42 km) section, between Lightwater and Popham, where the A30 and the A303 separated, opened in June 1971; this was followed by the Sunbury to Lightwater section which opened in July 1974. The second phase was to extend the motorway 10 miles (16 km) southwards between Popham and Winchester, ending at Compton. Planning began with the first public inquiry which was held in 1971, to set the line of the motorway, and this second section was opened in 1985. The third and final phase was to extend the motorway from Winchester to Southampton and the M27 motorway, and the northern part of this section was to impact on Winchester's bypass.

Winchester had been a traffic bottleneck for many years as several major routes passed through the historic city centre, including the A31, A33 and A34, as well as smaller routes like the A272. In the 1930s, a by-pass was planned to the east of the city, passing immediately west of St. Catherine's Hill, opening to traffic on 1 February 1940. Construction of this had been controversial as it affected the Itchen Valley and offered only a partial solution to congestion, with some people calling instead for a by-pass to the north and west of Winchester.

As a 1930s road construction project, the bypass was built to then-contemporary standards, including at-grade crossings at Bar End and at Hockley. As time progressed, the bypass became more and more of a bottleneck as roads around it were improved to higher standards, particularly after the opening of the A33 Chandler's Ford Bypass in 1968 and the A34 King's Worthy Link the following year, which meant all long distance traffic, as opposed to merely that from London to Southampton, was using the bypass. Morgan Morgan-Giles, Winchester's local MP, described the bypass as "utterly inadequate and dangerous, as everybody who lives in or near Winchester will agree. The accident figures are appalling. Therefore, a new motorway somewhere to relieve the traffic is urgently needed." The crossing at Bar End was grade separated in 1973, but the junction at Hockley remained a key point of congestion.

=== Public inquiries ===
At this point, the option of going over or through Twyford Down had not been considered, and the alignment of the proposed six-lane M3 motorway (three lines in each direction) was to run through the Itchen valley roughly west of the existing four-lane bypass. This would also require the realignment of the Itchen Navigation into the water meadows. However, there would be further screening of the motorway and pedestrian access to St. Catherine's Hill from the city. These proposals had gone through two public inquiries in 1971 and 1976, respectively. The first in 1971, the line order inquiry, had considered the proposed route of the motorway; and in 1973 the government approved this route. The second inquiry, in 1976, was to consider both the stopping up of side roads and the compulsory purchase orders for the land needed to build the motorway. The latter inquiry in particular had drawn significant objection from protesters, including masters from Winchester College. Morgan-Giles argued in Parliament to support the scheme, pointing out that Winchester and the Down had been cut off since construction of the old bypass anyway, and growth of Southampton Docks meant that improved links from London and the Midlands would become increasingly essential. This scheme was eventually rejected due to intensifying local pollution and disturbance.

In 1981, Kenneth Clarke, then the Parliamentary Secretary for Transport, stated that, since the route of the M3 was then fixed as far as Bar End, to the north of St. Catherine's Hill, that its route from there to Compton would undergo a fresh study, specifically stating that the Winchester Bypass should continue to be operational during construction of any new road, and that environmental matters were a key concern. By February 1983, consulting engineers Mott, Hay and Anderson had submitted a recommendation to complete the M3 through Twyford Down. Following the completion of the motorway to Bar End in the summer of 1985, the junction at Hockley was the only set of traffic lights between London and Southampton.

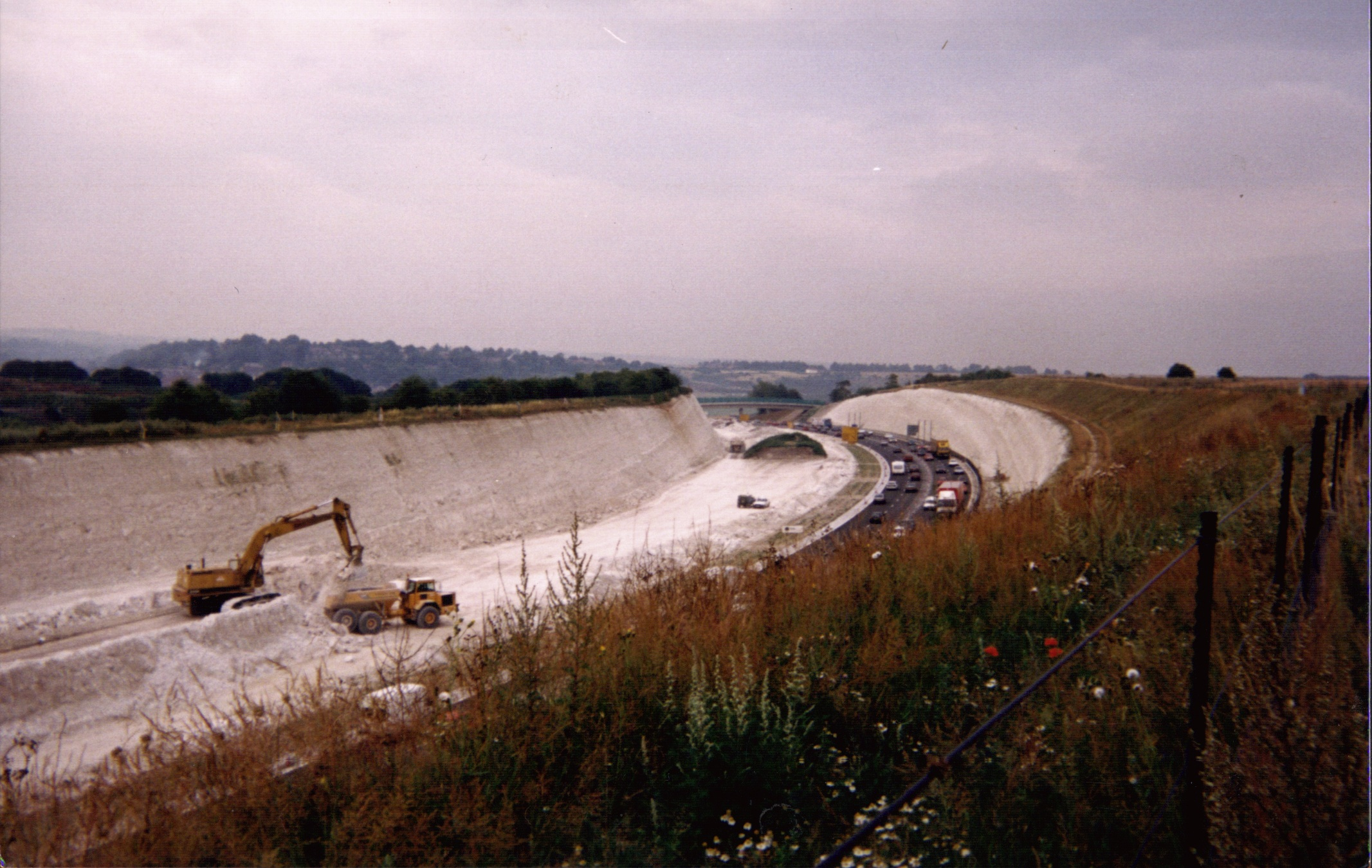
Twyford Down cutting during M3 construction in July 1994

The Ministry of Transport (MoT) had problems purchasing the land required to complete the route past Winchester. The land required, east of the city on Twyford Down, was owned by Winchester College, which refused to sell the land to the government because part was a water meadow. The desired route, however, had been chosen to avoid St. Catherine's Hill, and pass to the south. Proposals were made for a tunnel through Twyford Down, but the estimated cost for this was £75 million more than the estimated cost for a cutting, and the government dismissed the plans. The final route chosen ran to the south of St. Catherine's Hill, taking 1.91 hectares (4.7 acres) (approximately 4.5%) of the Site of Special Scientific Interest (SSSI), and went to a public inquiry in 1985, where the then Planning Officer of Winchester City Council described the route as "bold" and an "imaginative solution" In February 1992, the M3 was improved between Southampton and Compton, and soon afterwards work began on clearing the route across the down. Part of the contract stipulated that the old bypass would be removed and restored to nature, restoring direct access to St. Catherine's Hill.

=== Protests ===
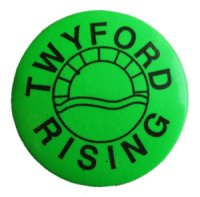
"Twyford Rising": A button badge worn by supporters of the Twyford Down road protest. Stencil-painted, graffiti versions of this logo appeared around Winchester during the early 1990s.

We respectfully petition the City Council to heed the strength of the case against the M3 and by vote in Council to rescind their previous support for the motorway between Popham and Compton.

— Petition from the M3 Joint Action Group to Winchester City Council

Protests against the completion of the M3 had been ongoing since 1973, with the formation of the M3 Joint Action Group by David Pare. The group gathered together a petition of 19,000, of which 11,227 were Winchester residents. The group was also active in distributing leaflets to the local community.

In March 1992, two travellers pitched a camp on the down, and discovered from local ramblers about the Bar End to Compton contract, meaning the land they were sitting on would soon be excavated. In response, noting that public inquiries had failed to stop construction, they decided to gather support. Environmental organisations attempted to take Department for Transport to the High Court, stating that the road was against the government's own environmental protection laws. The European Commission dropped its objections that August. David Croker, who had become head of the protest group Twyford Down Association, said they "had come to depend on the European Commission so we're very disappointed."

The principal arguments of the protesters were their concern about making wildlife species, such as the Chalkhill Blue butterfly, extinct, putting a highly visible scar on the landscape, and that they believed the new motorway would not adequately resolve traffic problems.

Protesters demonstrated their opposition to the road's construction by blocking the path of construction equipment. They were met by security officers from Group 4. In December 1992, in view of a film crew from The Observer, a protester was manhandled by five officers. Another protester, according to a report by local MP, for Southampton Itchen, John Denham, was strangled by officers and left unconscious on top of the Down for 30 minutes. Maggie Lambert, then a mature photography student, took numerous photographs of the protest, and challenged an injunction which suggested she had been involved with direct action. While Lord Justice Mann admitted there was no evidence to suggest she had done anything more than take photographs, the injunction was upheld. Protester Rebecca Lush of the Donga Tribe, who had stayed on the down from September to the night of eviction, later claimed "It was a horrific experience and very violent. We were dragged through thorns and we were being kicked and punched and someone pulled out a clump of my hair." In March 1993, Kenneth Carlisle, then Minister for Roads and Traffic, refused to order an inquiry into any wrongdoing or excessive force by security officers, stating it was a matter for the police.

The protest attracted different classes of people, the many of whom were peaceful. According to Denham, a popular phrase amongst those protesting was "I never thought that I would find myself doing something like this." Stephen Ward, who had been involved in the original 1970s protest, decided in early 1993 that excessive force was being used against protesters, and started keeping a log of events. He used this log when defending other protesters in court. He visited those who had been imprisoned and helped establish a legal precedent of the right for protesters and demonstrators to have a witness while being questioned.

Several artists, such as Jill Bray (b.1936) marked their protest by creating work based on the Twyford Down landscape.

=== Outcome ===
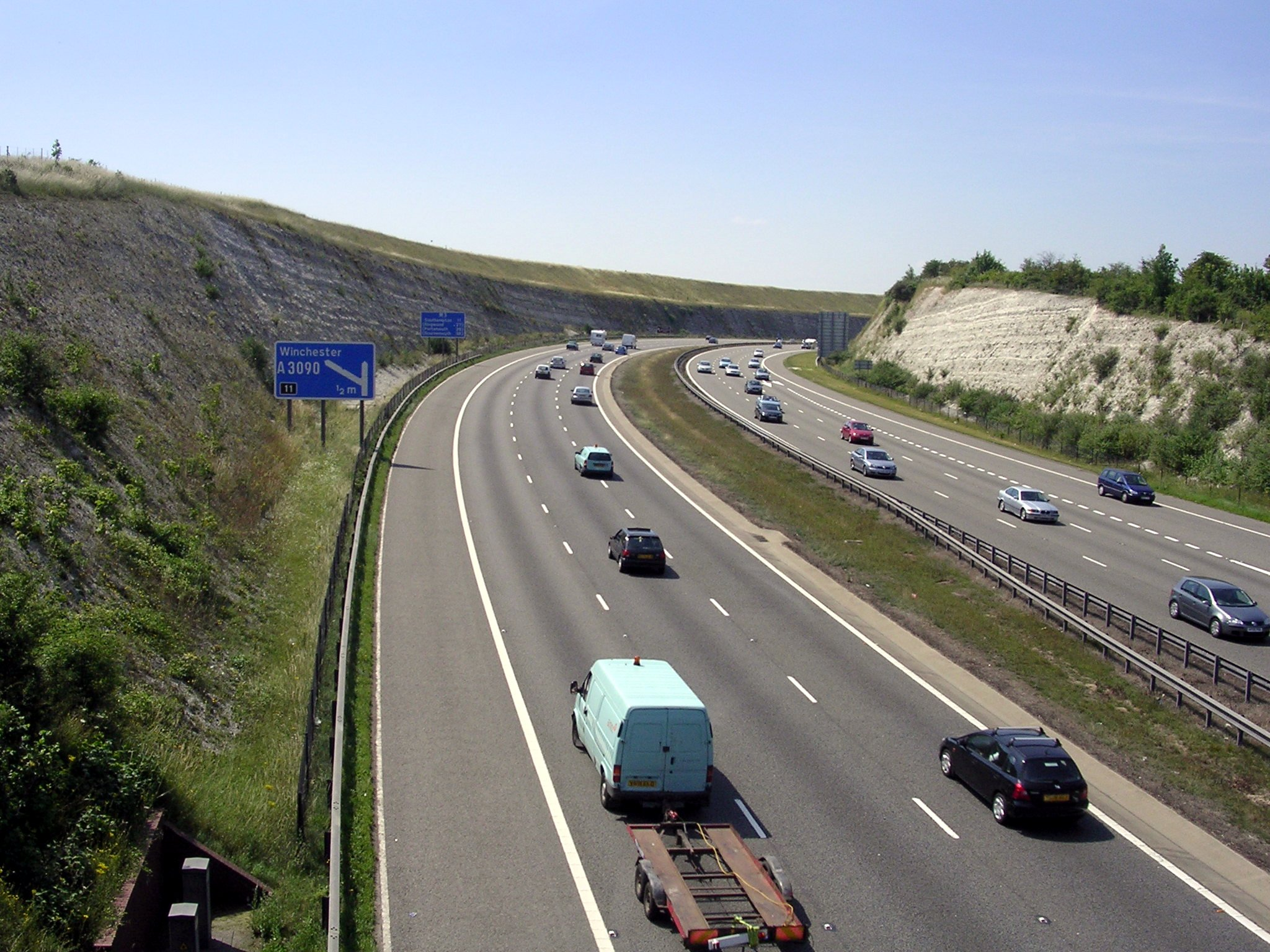
The Twyford Down cutting in August 2005

In 1995, the motorway section through Twyford Down was opened, making the M3 a continuous motorway. The old A33 Winchester Bypass between Bar End and Compton was then closed and removed. The new cutting caused the loss of 1.91 hectares (4.7 acres) of SSSI land. To redress this, the old route of the A33 was planted with 7.2 hectares (18 acres) of species-rich grassland under the supervision and monitoring of the Institute of Terrestrial Ecology. Replacing the bypass also reduced traffic volumes from the village of Twyford and removed the road that separated St. Catherine's Hill from the city. When interviewed for The Independent, local residents said the latter had transformed the place, one adding "St. Catherine's Hill used to be cut off from Winchester by the A33. Now there's open, peaceful countryside. It's wonderful."

Soon after the construction of the Twyford Down cutting, the pace of road construction in the United Kingdom slowed. In 1994, a government committee concluded that building more roads would only encourage more traffic, and that the way to ease congestion and pollution was to take measures to control car use rather than accommodate more. When Labour came to power in 1997, many road schemes were cancelled.

In 2000, campaigners mounted legal action to preserve an area of grassland created on the route of the old A33 Winchester bypass in mitigation of the land lost to the motorway which was threatened by a Park and Ride site. The legal action failed and the campaigners claimed that they had been betrayed for a second time. Land was provided elsewhere in mitigation.

In 2004, Winchester Cathedral received £86,000 from the Highways Agency in compensation for increased traffic noise from the M3. The Rev. Michael Till explained that "the noise comes beaming straight across The Close. It does change life having a perpetual background noise". Also in that year, veterans of a Twyford Down protest threatened a new campaign of direct action in response to 200 new road-building proposals in the government's recently unveiled ten-year transport plan. Rebecca Lush went on to found Road Block in 2005, which became part of the Campaign for Better Transport in 2007. Veteran road protester Chris Gillham believes that his efforts in protesting against Twyford Down, where he took an active role in confronting security officers and crawling under razor wire, helped later road schemes, such as the Hindhead Tunnel to be planned with greater consideration about the environment. In 2012, several of the original protesters returned to the down to hold a 20th anniversary celebration of the protest.

Twyford Down became part of the western extremity of the South Downs National Park in 2011, having previously been designated as part of the East Hampshire AONB (Area of Outstanding Natural Beauty).

== Cultural references ==
The acid jazz band Galliano released a 1994 single "Twyford Down" in response to the M3 road building.

== See also ==
- Environmental direct action in the United Kingdom
- M11 link road protest
- Newbury bypass
- Road protest in the United Kingdom
