= A3220 road =

Road in west London

Coordinates: 51.4897°N 0.1947°W

A3220
- A3220 highlighted in green
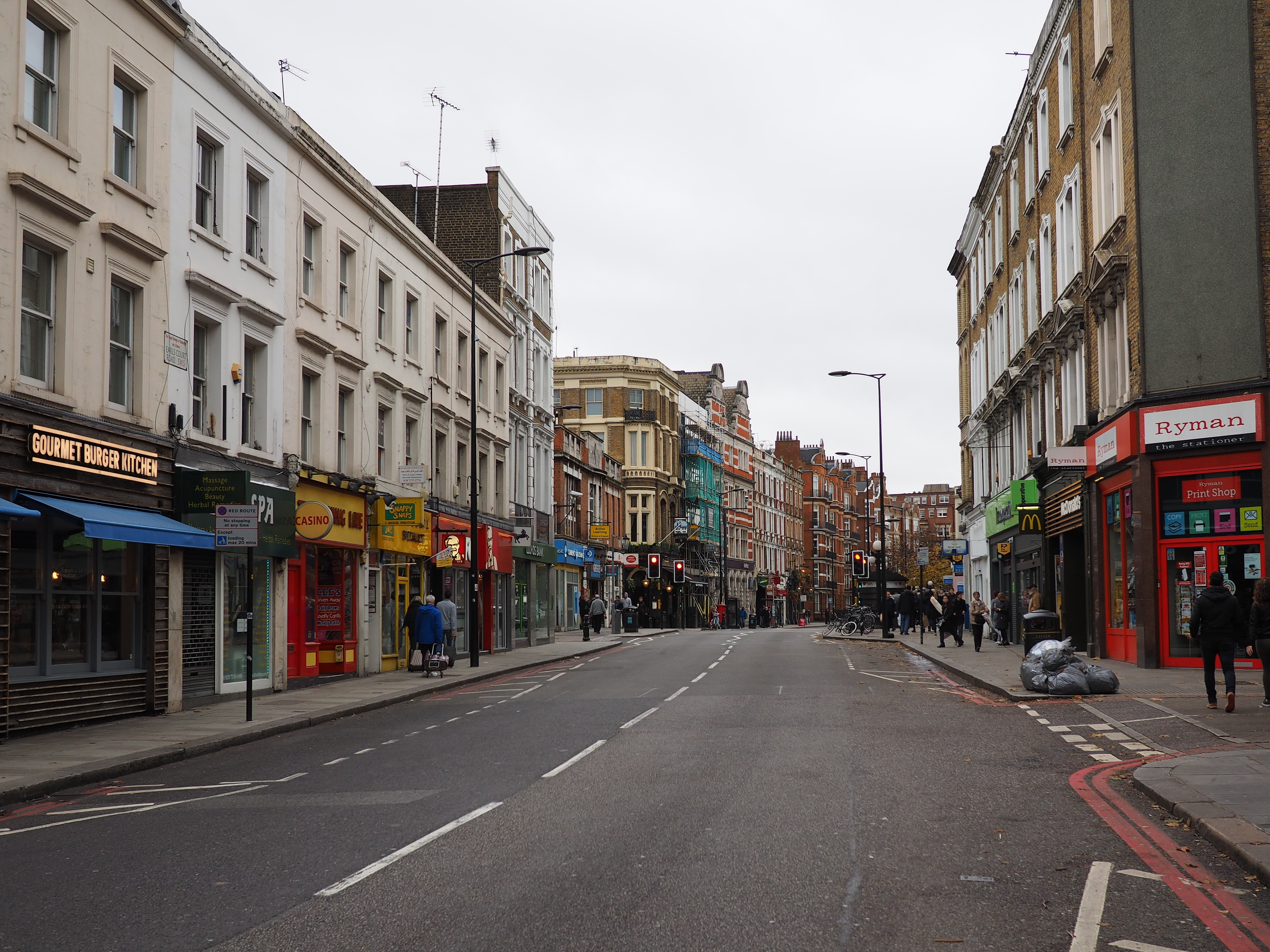
- Earls Court Road (A3220), in 2015

Route information
- Length: 5.3 mi (8.5 km)

Major junctions
- South end: Clapham Junction
- A3 A3036 A3205 A3212 A3217 A308 A304 A3218; A4 A315 A4020 A402; A40
- North end: Ladbroke Grove

Location
- Country: United Kingdom

Road network
- Roads in the United Kingdom; Motorways; A and B road zones

The A3220 is a primary A road in London, England. It runs north from Clapham Common to the A40 Westway at Ladbroke Grove.

== Route ==
The road crosses the River Thames at Battersea Bridge. Turning left at the northern end of the bridge, the A3220 follows the northern bank of the Thames for some 500 m before swinging northwestward and becoming two separate roads as part of a one-way system. 500 m after crossing the A315, the route returns to being a standard bidirectional single-carriageway road for some 750 m as far as the Holland Park roundabout, from where it forms the dual-carriageway West Cross Route, formerly the M41 motorway.

== West Cross Route ==
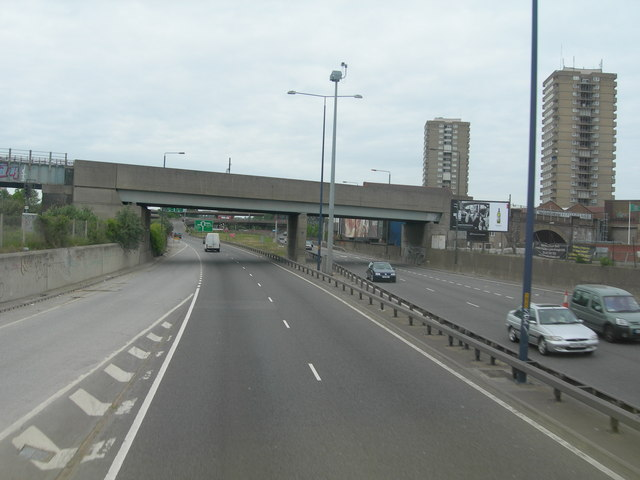
West Cross Route looking north

The West Cross Route (WCR) is a 0.75 mile (1.2 km) segment of dual carriageway section of the A3220 route in central London in The Royal Borough of Kensington and Chelsea, with a small part being shared with borderlining borough Hammersmith and Fulham. It runs north–south between the northern elevated roundabout junction with the western end of Westway (A40) and the southern Holland Park Roundabout. It opened in 1970, together with Westway.

The WCR was formerly the M41 motorway. Its status was downgraded to an A-road in 2000 when responsibility for trunk roads in Greater London was transferred from the Highways Agency to the Greater London Authority. Approximately halfway along the road's length a new junction was built to serve the Westfield London shopping development. The WCR was originally the designation for the western section of Ringway 1, the innermost circuit of the London Ringways network, a complex and comprehensive plan for a network of high-speed roads circling central London designed to manage and control the flow of traffic within the capital. The road would have run from Battersea to Harlesden and would have paralleled the National Rail West London line as an elevated road. Although the road no longer has motorway status, pedal cycles are prohibited by a sign at Holland Park roundabout.

=== Context ===
See London Ringways for a detailed history

The WCR and the other roads planned in the 1960s for central London had developed from early schemes prior to the Second World War through Sir Patrick Abercrombie's County of London Plan, 1943 and Greater London Plan, 1944 to a 1960s Greater London Council (GLC) scheme that would have involved the construction of many miles of motorway-standard roads across the city and demolition on a massive scale. Due to the huge construction costs and widespread public opposition, most of the scheme was cancelled in 1973 and the WCR, Westway and the East Cross Route in east London were the only significant parts to be built.

At the northern end, had the road been built in full, the entry and exit ramps to and from the elevated roundabout with the Westway would have been slip roads. The main route would have continued north beneath the roundabout into North Kensington and on to the junction with the North Cross Route at Harlesden. The alignment of the slip roads leaves a wide space between for the unbuilt carriageway. On the north side of the roundabout, two short stubs indicate the starting point of the slip roads that would have been provided for traffic joining or leaving the northern section of the WCR.

South of the Holland Park roundabout, which the WCR would have passed above on a flyover, the route would have continued along the alignment of the West London Line passing over Kensington (Olympia) station to a westbound-only interchange with the A4 at Talgarth Road. It would then have been elevated over Earls Court Exhibition Centre, skirted the western edge of Brompton Cemetery, and passed by Stamford Bridge stadium before an eastbound-only interchange along Lots Road to meet Cheyne Walk. Next the WCR would have crossed the River Thames on a new bridge and entered Battersea where it would have had a junction with the South Cross Route.

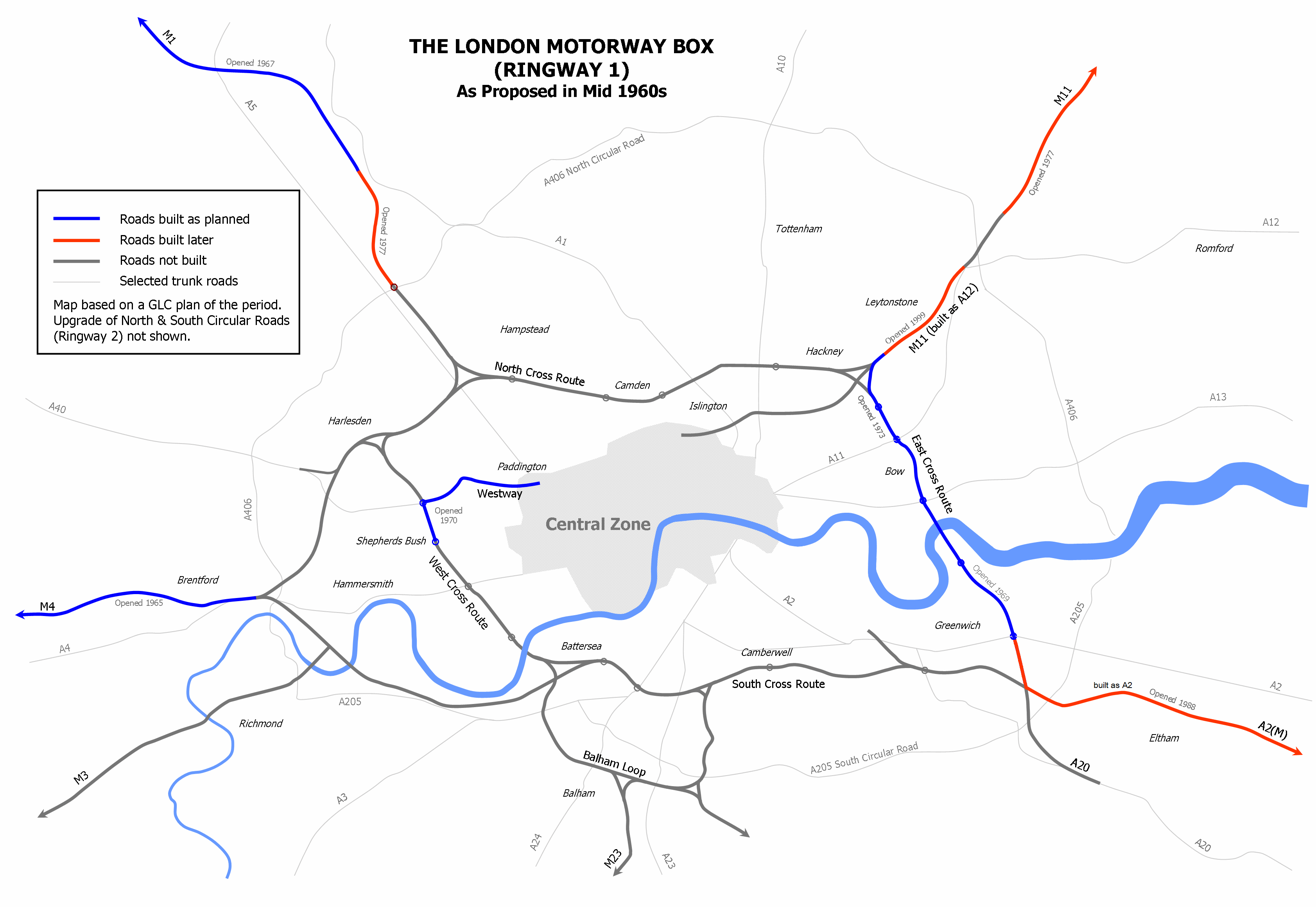
Plan of the London Motorway Box scheme from mid-1960s showing the West Cross Route as built and as planned
