= M12 motorway (Great Britain) =

Planned road in England

M12

Route information
- Length: 57 mi (92 km)
- Status: Cancelled
- History: Proposed 1960s, construction never started; cancelled 1994.

Major junctions
- West end: Brentwood, or Chelmsford
- East end: North Circular–M11 motorway junction

Location
- Country: United Kingdom
- Constituent country: England

Road network
- Roads in the United Kingdom; Motorways; A and B road zones

The M12 motorway was a planned motorway starting in north-east London and joining the A12 road in Essex. The 1960s scheme would have started at a junction with the M11 motorway and North Circular and ended near Brentwood, Chelmsford, or at the proposed new Maplin Sands airport; the motorway was part of the ambitious London Ringways plan to build motorways throughout London. Although most of the Ringways plan was cancelled in 1969, the M12 motorway project was still included in the Roads for Prosperity white paper published in 1989 along with major proposed developments to the A12 road. It was not formally cancelled until 30 March 1994 by the Secretary of State for Transport, John MacGregor.

== History ==
Plans for Radial Route 7 were announced on 12 October 1965. Tom Fraser, the Minister of Transport, appointed engineering consultants Brian Colquhoun and Partners to investigate route options. It was hoped that work would begin by 1970. The purpose of the new road was to allow traffic to avoid the congested A12 road. It would start from South Woodford on the A406 North Circular Road, run to the north of the A12, and join it either west of Gallows Corner or at the start of the Brentwood bypass. It could provide an alternative to the inconvenience and expense of upgrading the A12 and the Gants Hill and Gallows Corner junctions. A £4,000,000 (equivalent to £67,720,394 in 2025) scheme to provide a flyover at Gants Hill had been rejected because of its negative impact on amenity. It was believed that the new road through unbuilt upon land would be half the £17,000,000 (equivalent to £287,811,673 in 2025) cost of upgrading the existing route. The route to west of Gallows Corner would be built first. When complete, it would run between South Woodford and Brentwood, with a spur to Gallows Corner. By January 1969, the planned route was extended to Wanstead, to meet the M11 motorway.

== Routes ==
There were three main route proposals:

1. South Woodford (51.593°N 0.026°E) to Brentwood (51.620°N 0.305°E)
2. South Woodford to a proposed new London Airport at Maplin Sands
3. South Woodford (or M25 motorway) to Chelmsford

The motorway would have started in South Woodford creating a junction with the North Circular at the start of the current M11 motorway. It was intended that the North Circular would also be upgraded as Ringway 2 to motorway standard around London and be designated as the M15 motorway. It was also intended that the M11 would continue further into London joining Ringway 1 and then into Islington as 'Eastway'. Due to the cancellation and the scaling back of London Ringways during the 1970s, few of these ambitious plans were realised except of East Cross Route which was part of Ringway 1 and the M11 Link road (designated as the A12) which was opened in 1999 despite considerable opposition from the M11 link road protest.

Land was set aside for the later construction of the M12 interchange when the southern end of the M11 was constructed in the 1970s – the current carriageways of the M11 at the junction with the A406 would have been slip roads between these two routes. The start of the M12 would have been between the existing M11 lanes. Evidence for this can be seen on the ground:

- Both the northbound and southbound carriageways of the M11 have stubs of slip roads leading to nowhere in the centre of the road at the point where the carriageways have diverged from one another.
- The southbound carriageway has a flyover seemingly over nothing before it splits to join the North Circular Road.
- Land immediately to the east of this bridge has been reserved and kept free of housing.

=== South Woodford to Brentwood ===
From South Woodford the M12 would have headed east over what is still mostly open land north of Clayhall and south of Hainault then north-east to Havering-atte-Bower then east towards South Weald, meeting the M25 motorway (Ringway 3) a little north of junction 28. The motorway would have ended a short distance beyond the M25 on the Brentwood Bypass (A12).

=== South Woodford to Maplin Sands ===
The alignment of this route was not finalised before the proposed airport at Maplin Sands was cancelled, but it would have matched the South Woodford-Brentwood alignment to Havering-atte-Bower. The M12 would most probably have then headed south-east and then south to pass east of Harold Hill parallel with the M25 as far as junction 29 where it would have turned east to run north of the A127 passing to the north of Basildon, south of Wickford and to the north of Rayleigh and Southend-on-Sea before heading out into the North Sea to the artificial island that was to be constructed on Maplin Sands for the proposed airport.

=== South Woodford to Chelmsford ===
The M12 to Chelmsford would have run on the alignment previously described to Havering-atte-Bower, then continued north-east to meet the M25 (where an additional junction would have been constructed) south of Wattons Green at the administrative boundary between Greater London and Essex. The motorway would have passed north of Pilgrims Hatch and south of Doddinghurst to meet the A12 at its junction with the A414 south of Chelmsford.
