= South Cross Route =

South Cross Route (SCR) was the designation for the southern section of Ringway 1, the innermost circuit of the London Ringways network, a complex and comprehensive plan for a network of high speed roads circling and radiating out from central London designed to manage and control the flow of traffic within the capital.

The SCR was planned during the late 1960s along with the rest of the Ringway scheme but was never constructed due to large scale opposition from many quarters. The construction work required to pass a six-lane dual carriageway with grade separated junctions through the congested streets of south London would have been enormous and devastating to the communities through which it passed.

== Route ==
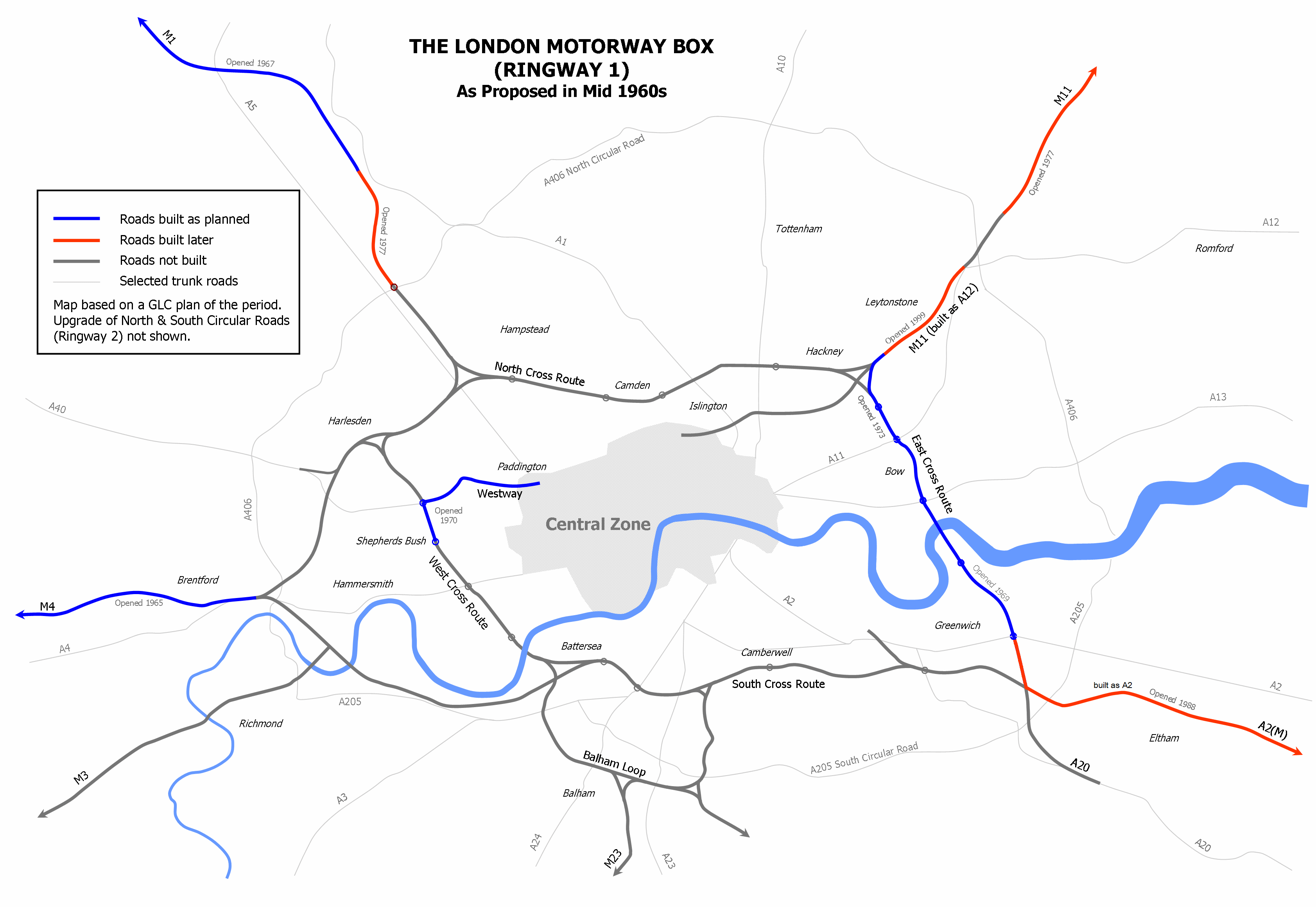
Plan of the London Motorway Box scheme from mid 1960s showing the South Cross Route, Balham Loop and "South Cross Route to Parkway D Radial"

The SCR would have started in Battersea at the south-west corner of Ringway 1 where it would have had a junction with the West Cross Route coming south-east across the River Thames from Earl's Court. The junction was planned to be located on the triangle of land between the railway lines around Falcon Park and crossing Latchmere Road (A3220). The junction would also have had a connection westwards to a feeder motorway to the planned terminus of the M3 motorway and the actual terminus of the M4 motorway at Gunnersbury. It is possible that this motorway would have been designated as a continuation of the M4.

In the mid-1960s the Ringways plan also included a motorway, known as the Balham Loop, heading south-west from the triangular junction through Clapham Junction station, then south towards Balham and east to Tulse Hill. This route was omitted from the plans in 1967.

Heading east, the SCR would have followed the route of the National Rail main line heading into Waterloo station crossing the tracks south-west of Queenstown Road station. Here the SCR would have had a junction with Queenstown Road (A3216) and passed over the railway and industrial land there to head south-east towards Heathbrook Park and Wandsworth Road station. The SCR would then have followed the south side of the line, requiring the demolition of most of the east side of Edgeley Road, then past Clapham High Street station to a junction with Clapham High Street (A3).

Continuing east, the SCR would have claimed much of the north side of Ferndale Road as well as most, if not all, of Dolman, Glendall and Bythorn Streets, three short cul-de-sacs between Ferndale Road and the railway tracks. The SCR would have next reached a difficult section through Brixton town centre where a complexity of railway tracks branching and crossing above one another to follow different routes, Brixton station and the narrow shopping streets would have needed considerable demolition to make a route for the elevated SCR. In conjunction with the road scheme, the Greater London Council proposed a scheme for the almost total clearance and reconstruction of the town centre including the construction of more than a dozen 50-storey blocks of flats as well as widespread low-rise residential and commercial projects. Just as the road itself attracted objections, the redevelopment of the town centre met with considerable local opposition and virtually none of the proposals were implemented.

For a while, the destruction planned for Brixton town centre would have been even greater. It was intended to locate a junction here to connect the SCR to a motorway running south-east along the railway line to Herne Hill and then to South Norwood and a probable terminal on Ringway 3 at or near Addington. This motorway, known to the road planners as the "South Cross Route to Parkway D Radial" was still part of the Ringways Plan in 1969 but had been cancelled by 1972 along with the southern section of Ringway 2.

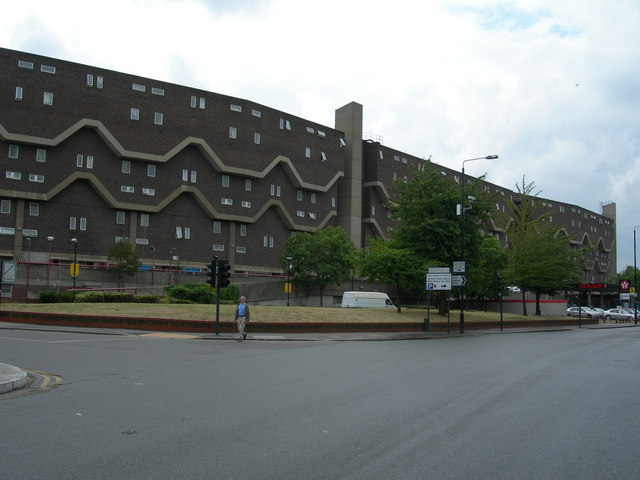
Southwyck House in Brixton was specifically designed to shield the housing estate behind it from the noise of Ringway 1

East of Brixton Road (A23), the SCR would have followed Coldharbour Lane and passed the north side of the Moorland Estate where the council block on the north side, Southwyck House, is a relic of the GLC redevelopment scheme and was designed to present a barrier to protect the estate beyond from the noise of the elevated motorway.

Crossing the southbound railway line from Blackfriars station, the SCR would have continued east, requiring further demolitions on the south side of the Loughborough Junction triangle to reach Ruskin Park. East of Ruskin Park the SCR would have passed along Champion Park between Denmark Hill station and the Salvation Army's William Booth College.

East of Denmark Hill station the south side of the railway line to the next station at Peckham Rye was, in the late 1960s, a relatively wide and clear embankment and would have provided the space for another road junction, connecting either to Grove Lane or possibly across the railway to Peckham Road via Vestry Road and Lucas Gardens. In recent years a number of residential developments have been constructed in this area.

For its route through Peckham the SCR would have claimed Blenheim Grove on the south side of the station and more industrial land to its east before following the railway to Nunhead station on an alignment where the wide area of railway land to the south of the tracks would have provided a route requiring only limited demolition, mainly to the north side of Kimberley Avenue. To the east of Nunhead station, the SCR would have crossed two further sets of railway tracks - one branching south-east to Crofton Park and the other the line between New Cross Gate and Brockley stations. Again, when the SCR was planned, this section was an uninterrupted alignment for the motorway to follow but it has since been developed with residential infill schemes.

East of the New Cross Gate railway tracks the railway land continues to be wide enough for the SCR to have passed with only limited demolition works required as it headed towards Lewisham town centre. At Lewisham the SCR would have merged with a spur from the north-west that was planned to run 0.75 miles along the New Cross railway line to end at a junction on New Cross Road (A2). The SCR would have crossed to the north side of the railway to skirt the town centre passing through industrial and commercial areas and crossing over the route now occupied by the Docklands Light Railway. Residential demolitions would have been required at the west end of Granville Park to clear the path but the route was then clear to Blackheath station.

East of Blackheath station the SCR looped south-east to follow the railway line through the north side of Blackheath Park, where some demolitions would have been necessary, before skirting the sports ground and Kidbrooke station to meet the junction of the East Cross Route coming south from the Blackwall Tunnel, the A2 Rochester Way Relief Road coming east from Eltham and the A20 coming north from Mottingham.

At this junction, the south-east corner of the London Motorway Box (Ringway 1) traffic would have been directed on to the A2 with slip roads providing connections to and from the A20 and the East Cross Route.

=== Balham Loop ===
The purpose of the Balham Loop motorway was to provide a connection between Ringway 1 and the M23 motorway running through south London. Other incoming motorways, such as the M1 and M11, were intended to terminate directly on the innermost Ringway, but the route of the M23 through south London was considerably more difficult than the M1's route through north London and there was no simple or direct route for the M23 to reach Ringway 1 in Clapham. Instead, the Balham Loop would have acted as a distributor road connecting to the West Cross Route and SCR at Battersea and to the SCR at Brixton, via the "South Cross Route to Parkway D Radial".

Leaving the junction of the West Cross Route and SCR heading south-west, the Balham Loop would have passed over the railway land at Clapham Junction station before heading south to cross the A3 at Battersea Rise then run parallel with the railway across Wandsworth Common to cross Nightingale Lane (B229) and past Wandsworth Common station.

It is not certain which side of the railway the motorway would have run but the south side of the railway through Balham is likely to have offered the road planners the easier route. At Tooting Common the Balham Loop would have had a Y-shaped junction with the end of the M23 motorway coming north from Streatham Vale and would then have continued through Streatham Hill, over the A23 and then would have cut through a residential area to reach the triangular railway junction south of Tulse Hill station. Here the Balham Loop would have met the "South Cross Route to Parkway D Radial" motorway and traffic would have had the option of turning north-east towards Brixton or south-east to West Norwood.

The Balham Loop was cancelled in 1967 when it was decided that the M23 would be terminated further south on Ringway 2 at Streatham Vale.

=== South Cross Route to Parkway D Radial ===
The "South Cross Route to Parkway D Radial" motorway was due to start on the SCR at Brixton and run south-east out of London to Ringway 3. The route was an early omission from the developing Ringways plans and the alignment in the outer suburbs is uncertain. The cumbersome name reflects the reuse of an earlier route proposal from Sir Patrick Abercrombie's County of London Plan, 1943. The Ringway plan's Ringway 3 equated to Parkway D from Abercrombie's plan. The use of the obsolete terminology suggests that the planning for this road was not a top priority for the road planners.

From the SCR the radial motorway would have first followed the railway line south-east past Herne Hill and Brockwell Park to Tulse Hill, West Norwood and Crystal Palace station where it would have turned and headed south along the line towards South Norwood Country Park, which in the 1960s was a sewage works. From here the route is uncertain but it would have probably crossed Addiscombe and Shirley to reach Addington and Ringway 3.

== Context ==
See London Ringways for a detailed history

The SCR and the other roads planned in the 1960s for central London had developed from early schemes prior to the Second World War through Sir Patrick Abercrombie's County of London Plan, 1943 and Greater London Plan, 1944 to a 1960s Greater London Council (GLC) scheme that would have involved the construction of many miles of motorway standard roads across the city and demolition on a massive scale. Due to the huge construction costs and widespread public opposition, most of the scheme including the SCR was cancelled in 1973. Only the East Cross Route, part of the West Cross Route and the Westway were built.

== See also ==
- North Cross Route
- Homes before Roads

== Bibliography ==
- Asher, Wayne. 2018. Rings Around London - Orbital Motorways and The Battle For Homes Before Roads. ISBN 978-1-85414-421-8
