= London Ring Road =

London Ring Road may refer to:

Extant roads:

- London Inner Ring Road, a 12-mile (19 km) route formed from a number of major roads that encircle Central London
- North Circular Road and South Circular Road, a ring road through London's outer suburbs, that encircles the inner suburbs and central area
- M25 motorway, the 117-mile (188 km) orbital motorway that encircles almost all of Greater London

Proposed roads:

- London Ringways, a series of four ring roads planned in the 1960s to circle London at various distances from the city centre
  - Ringway 1 - The London Motorway box, comprising the North, East, South and West Cross Routes.
  - Ringway 2 - Upgrade of North Circular Road and replacement for South Circular Road.
  - Ringway 3 - A new road, the north section of which became part of the M25.
  - Ringway 4 - A new road, the south section of which became part of the M25 and M26.
