= M15 motorway =

M15 motorway may refer to:

- M15 motorway (Great Britain), an upgrade of the A406 North Circular Road that was planned in the 1960s–1970s but never built
- M15 motorway (Hungary), a road connecting the M1 and the Slovakian border
- M15 Cunningham Highway, a motorway grade road connecting Brisbane, Queensland, to the south-west
- M15 Hunter Expressway, a motorway connecting Newcastle, New South Wales, to Singleton
