= Tunnel Avenue =

Tunnel Avenue may be:

- New Jersey Route 139, United States
- A102 road south of Blackwall Tunnel, Greenwich, east London, England
- A street in San Francisco, California, United States
- A street in Greenwich, London, United Kingdom
