= West Cross Route =

Dual carriageway section of the A3220 route in central London

Coordinates: 51°30′47″N 0°13′15″W

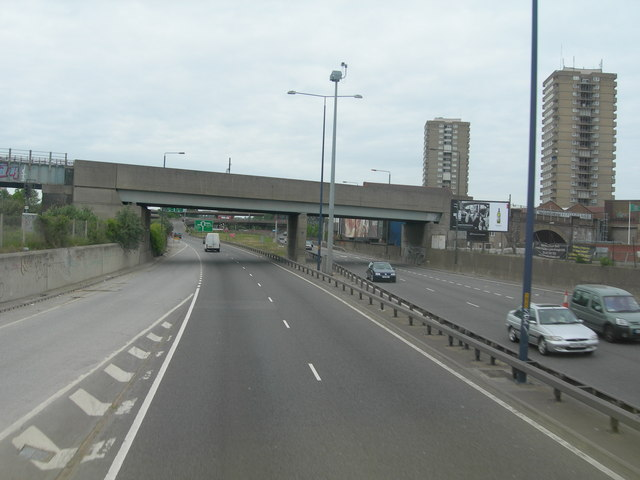
West Cross Route looking north

The West Cross Route (WCR) is a 0.75-mile-long (1.21 km) segment of the dual carriageway of the A3220 route in West London running north–south between the northern elevated roundabout junction with the western end of Westway (A40) and the southern Holland Park Roundabout. The WCR runs through Shepherd's Bush to its west and Notting Hill to its east.

The WCR opened in 1970, together with Westway. It was formerly the M41 motorway; its status was downgraded to an A-road in 2000 when responsibility for trunk roads in Greater London was transferred from the Highways Agency to the Greater London Authority. Although the road no longer has motorway status, pedal cycles are prohibited by a sign at Holland Park roundabout. Approximately halfway along the road's length a new junction was built to serve the Westfield London shopping development. Administratively the road is within the Royal Borough of Kensington and Chelsea with a small part being shared with bordering borough Hammersmith and Fulham.

== Context ==
See London Ringways for a detailed history

The WCR and the other roads planned in the 1960s for central London had developed from early schemes prior to the Second World War through Sir Patrick Abercrombie's County of London Plan, 1943 and Greater London Plan, 1944 to a 1960s Greater London Council (GLC) scheme that would have involved the construction of many miles of motorway-standard roads across the city and demolition on a massive scale. Due to the huge construction costs and widespread public opposition, most of the scheme was cancelled in 1973 and the WCR, Westway and the East Cross Route in east London were the only significant parts to be built.

The WCR was originally the designation for the western section of Ringway 1, the innermost circuit of the London Ringways network, a complex and comprehensive plan for a network of high-speed roads circling central London designed to manage and control the flow of traffic within the capital. The road would have run from Battersea to Harlesden and would have paralleled the National Rail West London Line as an elevated road.

At the northern end, had the road been built in full, the entry and exit ramps to and from the elevated roundabout with the Westway would have been slip roads. The main route would have continued north beneath the roundabout into North Kensington and on to the junction with the North Cross Route at Harlesden. The alignment of the slip roads leaves a wide space between for the unbuilt carriageway. On the north side of the roundabout, two short stubs indicate the starting point of the slip roads that would have been provided for traffic joining or leaving the northern section of the WCR.

South of the Holland Park roundabout, which the WCR would have passed above on a flyover, the route would have continued along the alignment of the West London Line passing over Kensington (Olympia) station to a westbound-only interchange with the A4 at Talgarth Road. It would then have been elevated over Earls Court Exhibition Centre, skirted the western edge of Brompton Cemetery, and passed by Stamford Bridge stadium before an eastbound-only interchange along Lots Road to meet Cheyne Walk. Next the WCR would have crossed the River Thames on a new bridge and entered Battersea where it would have had a junction with the South Cross Route.

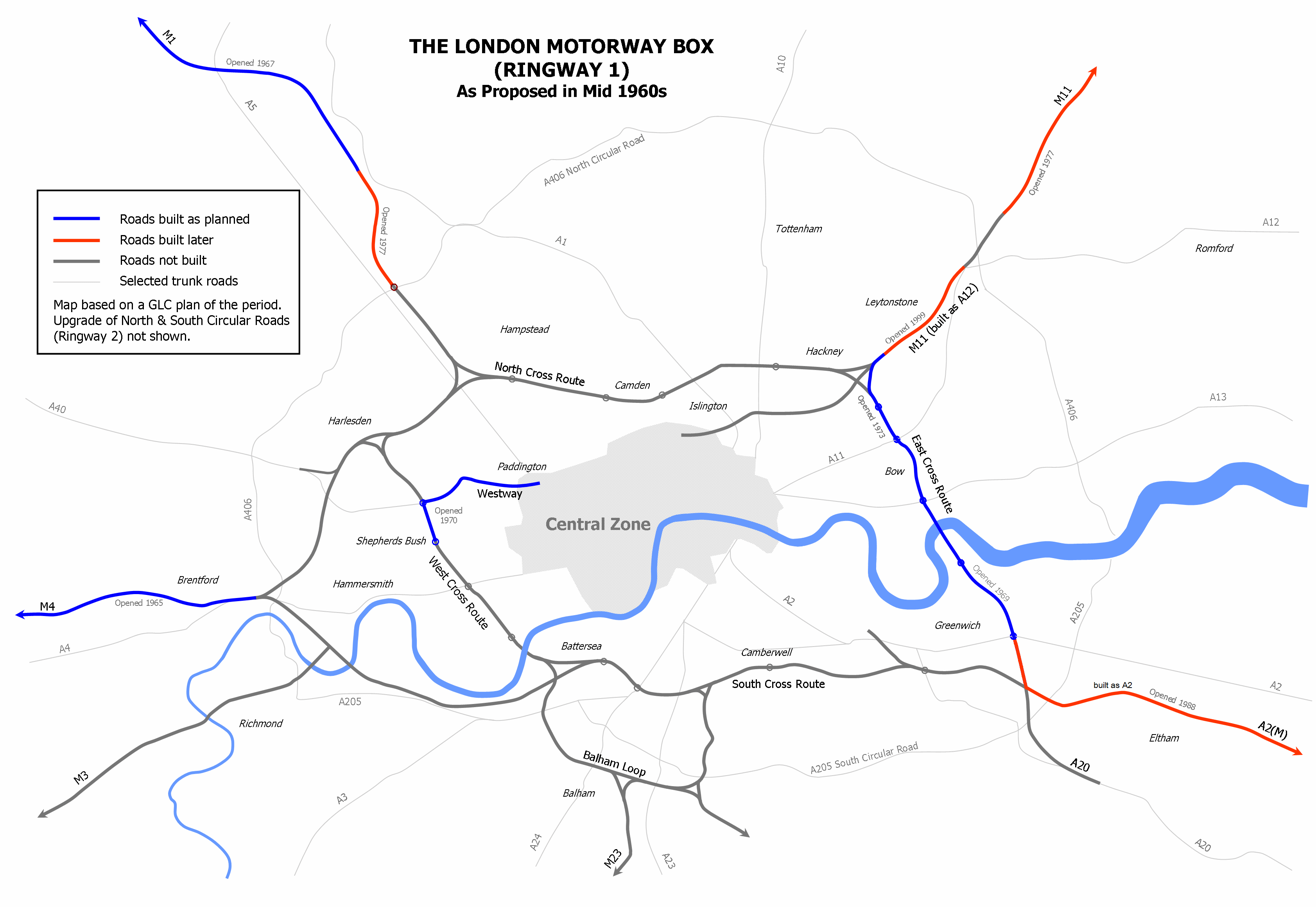
Plan of the London Motorway Box scheme from mid-1960s showing the West Cross Route as built and as planned

== Reclaim the Streets street party ==
On 13 July 1996, around 6,000 protesters took over part of the elevated motorway for over eight hours from around midday, played sound-systems and danced in a protest organised by the direct action collective Reclaim the Streets. Sand was placed on the motorway for young children to play on, and a banner carrying the Situationist International slogan "The Society That Abolishes Every Adventure Makes Its Own Abolition the Only Possible Adventure" was raised. Hidden underneath dancers walking on stilts and wearing huge, wire-supported dresses, environmental activists drilled holes in the tarmac and planted trees.

== See also ==
- Homes before Roads
