= M23 motorway =

Road in Surrey and Sussex, England

M23

- M23 highlighted in blue Shown with UK motorway network

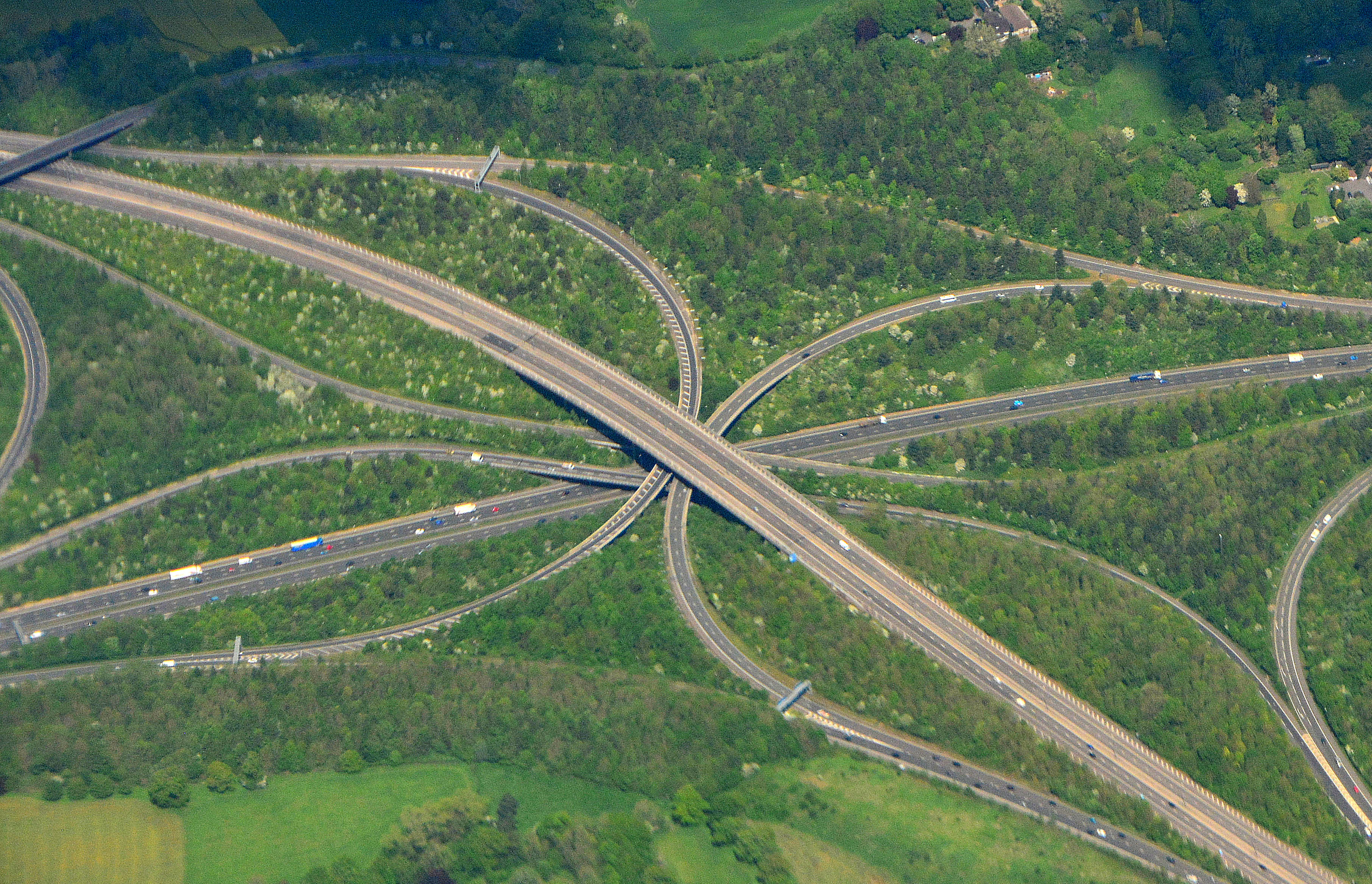
- The motorway crossing over the M25, 2014

Route information
- Maintained by National Highways
- Length: 15.9 mi (25.6 km)
- Existed: 1974–present
- History: Opened: 1974; Completed: 1975

Major junctions
- North end: Hooley
- J8 → M25 motorway
- South end: Pease Pottage

Location
- Country: United Kingdom
- Counties: Surrey, West Sussex
- Primary destinations: London; Gatwick Airport; Crawley

Road network
- Roads in the United Kingdom; Motorways; A and B road zones
← M20	→ M25

The M23 is a motorway in England, running from the south of Hooley in Surrey to Pease Pottage, connected to the south of the significant town of Crawley in West Sussex. Hooley is immediately south of the London Borough of Croydon. Both ends of the motorway form a de-merger from (and merger back into) the A23 which runs from London to Brighton.

Its northernmost part amounts to a 2-mile (3.2 km) spur north of junction 7 of the M25 motorway (junction 8 of the M23) which has spur roads for all directions (is a stack interchange) and intuitively would be numbered 1 – as a long, publicly opposed section further to the north was never built. During its 17 miles (27 km) length it runs without a serving junction for central parts of Redhill, Surrey, as its next and busiest junction is for Gatwick Airport and it concludes with three, widely spaced out, for Crawley which also serve Horsham and East Grinstead. It cuts through the a gap in the North Downs and a slight gap in the Greensand Ridge, long mainly wooded hill ranges, locally part of the Surrey Hills National Landscape. For the airport to its west, junction 9, has no direct routes to the more rural east; however sweeping to the north-west point of the airport, the M23 Spur gives ready access to Horley, Charlwood and all the northernmost parts and associated out of town workplaces of Crawley.

To the south the A23 is a dualled trunk road so far as the city of Brighton, whereas to the north it sees long single-carriageway urban parts, in the centre of Hooley, north Coulsdon, south Purley, and no traffic-prioritised continuations to reach Inner London, which was the original scheme behind the motorway.

== History ==
In late July 1959, Surrey County Council gave their proposed route of the London to Sussex motor road to the government. This 1959 plan would start at Streatham and meet the South Orbital Road at Ockley Hill in Chaldon, largely following the route of the current M23.

In 1965, it became known as the London - Crawley Motorway. The Merstham interchange, with the M25, was approved by the government, with the near M25 section in July 1967. The public inquiry was from October 10 1967. In May 1968 the route was fixed, after inquiry in October and November 1967, along with first twelve miles of the M25, known as the South Orbital motorway.

=== Construction ===
Construction started around late February 1972, with a section of the M25, both constructed by W. & C. French of south Essex. The motorway was constructed between 1972 and 1975, at the same time as the southern section of the M25 from Godstone to Reigate (M25 junctions 6 to 8).

The whole motorway opened on Thursday December 19 1974, but the nearby M25 section opened later.

=== Structure ===
The current northern terminus at junction 7 runs along most of what would have been its own sliproads for a broad northern continuation. In so doing, these splayed roads split to offer access to the more urban road which the M23 bypasses, the A23, and a flyover above the splayed fledgling motorway still exists for the onward northern continuation which remains unused, between these briefly, but widely, splayed carriageways of the motorway.

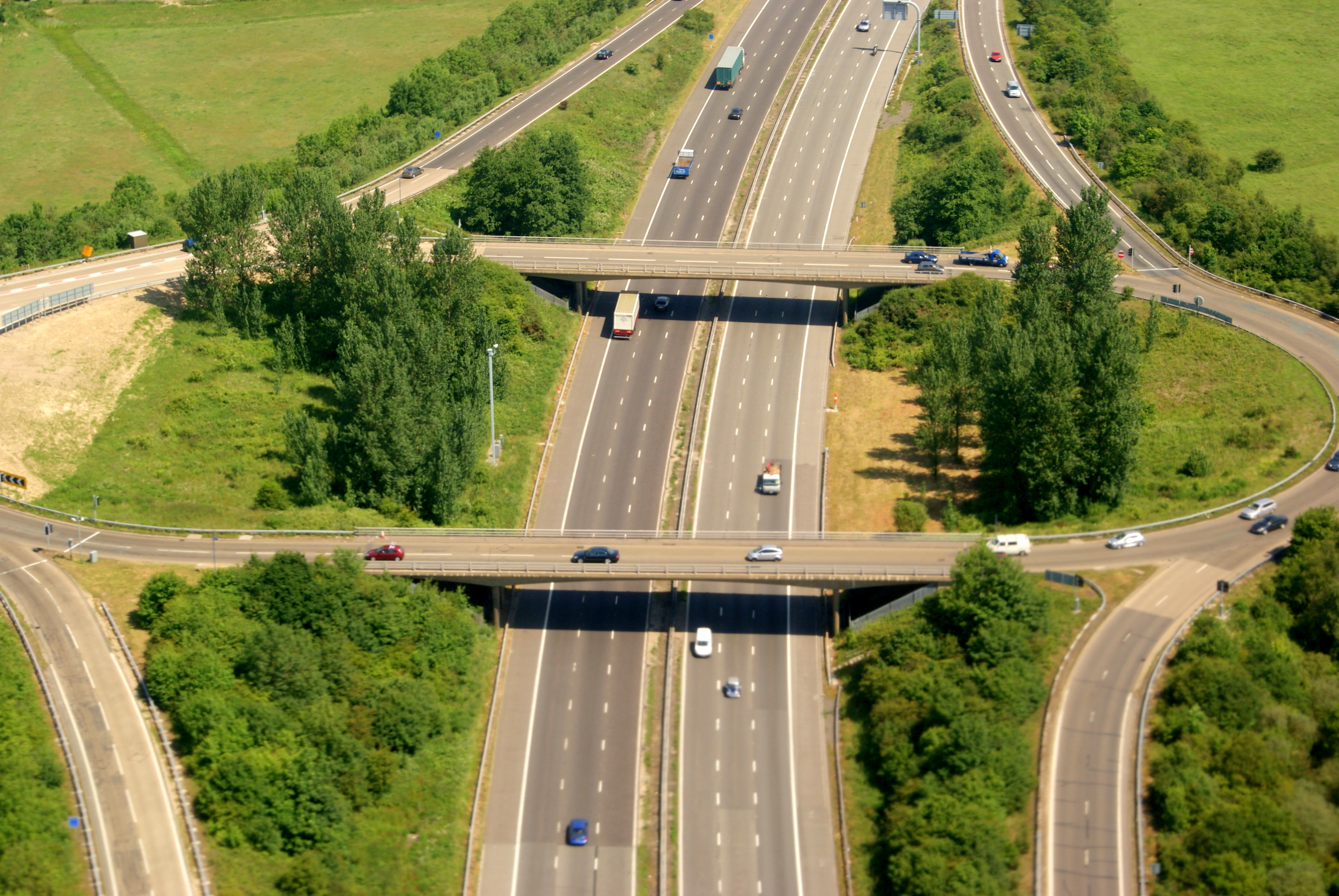
Junction 9, looking north

=== Cancellation of northern section ===
The cancellation of the unbuilt northern section from the M25 in towards Central London has resulted in the A23 carrying the majority of traffic through South London to the motorway. This is largely a single carriageway route, with many level junctions, traffic lights and awkward interchanges. It travels largely through residential areas and means south London reliance on the A22 (hence the Caterham Bypass), running SSE, and A3/A3(M) running SW (southwest).

=== Further junctions ===
A new junction (10a) was opened in 1997, between junctions 10 and 11, for access to the new Crawley neighbourhood of Maidenbower. It was financed as part of the development of Maidenbower by the construction consortium. It has only a northbound slip road, no southbound access.

== Unbuilt sections ==
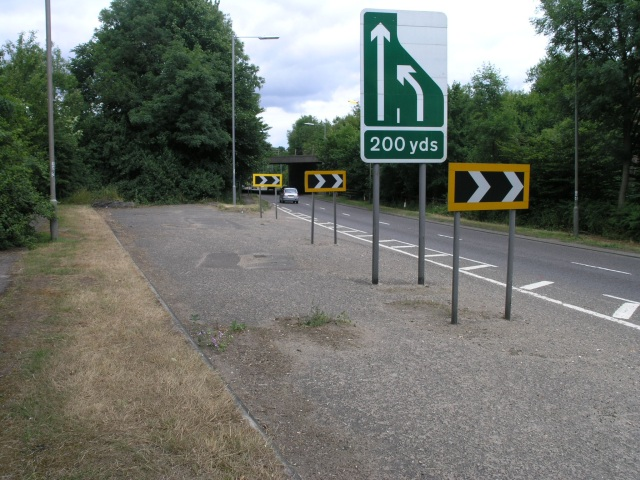
Unfinished junction 7 at Hooley

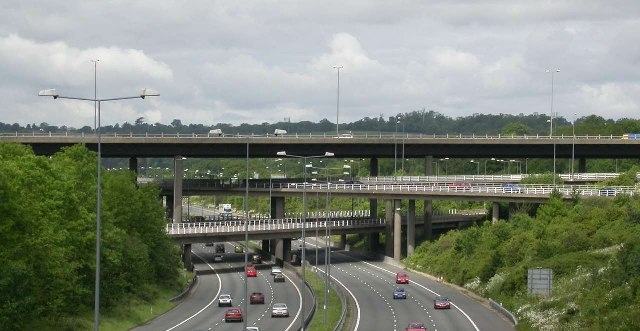
Stack interchange at Junction 8 with the M25 near Merstham

The M23 was planned to relieve congestion on the A23 through Streatham, Thornton Heath, Purley and Coulsdon in south London and was originally intended to terminate in Streatham Vale at a junction with the controversial London Ringways Plan's Ringway 2 (the intended replacement of the South Circular Road (A205)).

In an earlier version of the Ringways Plan it would have continued into central London where it would have met the Balham Loop spur from Ringway 1 (the London Motorway Box) at Tooting. This was dropped in 1967, when the northern terminus was changed to Ringway 2. While a definite route had not been chosen at that time for the northern section, approval was met for the route south of the Greater London boundary at Hooley.

By 1972 the southern section of Ringway 2 had been dropped from the plan, with an alternative proposal that the M23 continue further into London to end on Ringway 1. This was immediately countered in the same year by the Greater London Council (GLC), who announced they would not be building that Ringway, which meant that had the M23 continued into inner London it would not have had the arteries required at its northern end to distribute traffic to the east and west. The plan was again scaled back to scrap any reaching to Mitcham Common but which would see an unsuitable terminus on Croydon Road (A232). and Minister for Transport "postponed indefinitely" the plan. By the late 1970s, this proposed northern corridor earmarked for significant demolition saw urban blight, and while the proposals were finally dropped in the mid-1980s, pockets of land that had been acquired were not released by the Department for Transport until the mid-1990s.

The unbuilt six-junctions motorway north of Hooley was due to the refusal of the GLC to finance the project, understanding the ultimately decisive, large-scale opposition to the construction of London Ringways, any network of high speed roads within London. However, the scale of the four-tier junction between the M23 and the M25, one of only three stack interchanges in the UK at the time, is indicative of the importance attached to the M23 at that time.

== Smart motorway ==
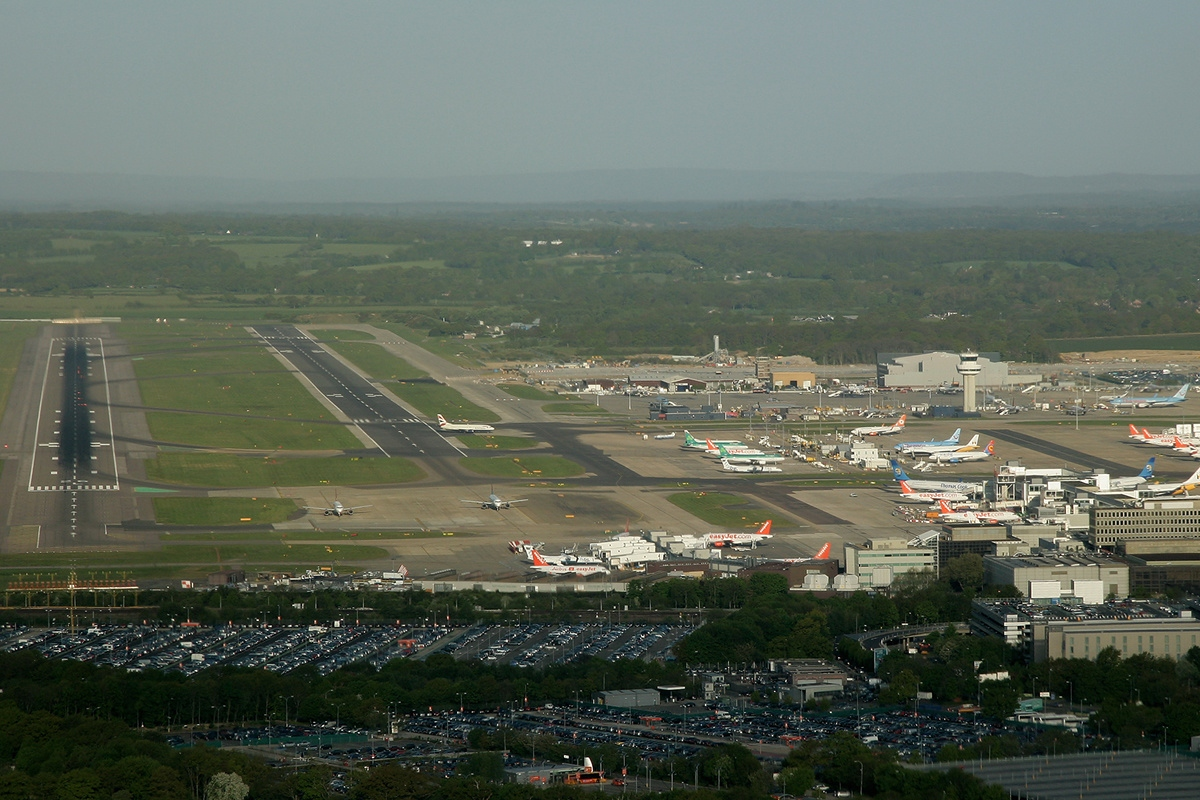
Gatwick Airport is near the M23

Between July 2018 and July 2020 works took place to upgrade the M23 between junctions 8 and 10 to an all-lane-running motorway. The upgrades took place mostly for more reliable journeys to Gatwick Airport and increase the overall capacity of the route. The upgrades include an all-lane-running motorway, 12 new emergency areas, a new concrete central barrier replacing the current steel one, new roadside sound barriers, variable speed limits and two new emergency access slip roads. Changes were also implemented on the M23 junction 9 spurs: the hard shoulder westbound now a running lane; and for 50 mph (80 km/h) speed limits in both directions.

In January 2020, all smart motorway projects were put under review due to concerns about their safety, during this period no new smart motorways could open. The review was published on 12 March 2020 and required no immediate amendments to the design or construction, however new technology to detect static vehicles is required to be fitted within three years, and a review on spacing of emergency refuge areas was to be carried out.

The fourth lanes were opened to traffic on 2 April 2020 with a temporary 50 mph speed limit. Works ran into the late summer to install more equipment, followed by testing and commissioning, before the project could complete and run at the national speed limit.

== Junctions ==
Data from driver location signs are used to provide distance and carriageway identifier information. Where a junction spans several hundred metres (yards) and start and end points are available, both are cited.

County	Location	mi	km	Junction	Destinations	Notes
Surrey	Merstham	17.0; 17.5	27.4; 28.2	7 (Note: 51.2805°N 0.1551°W)	A23 - Croydon	Road continues as A23 to Croydon
Surrey	Merstham	19.0; 19.3	30.5; 31.0	8 (Note: 51.2642°N 0.1279°W) Mersham Interchange	M25 - Heathrow, Watford, Dartford Crossing, Reigate	
West Sussex	Horley	26.5; 26.8	42.7; 43.1	9 (Note: 51.1592°N 0.1344°W)	A23 - Gatwick, Redhill	Terminus of spur towards Gatwick
West Sussex	Crawley	28.5; 28.6	45.8; 46.1	10 (Note: 51.1327°N 0.1413°W)	A264 - East Grinstead A2011 - Crawley	
West Sussex	Crawley	30.3; 30.6	48.8; 49.2	10a (Note: 51.1045°N 0.1440°W)	B2036 - Crawley	No exit from M23 Northbound, no access to M23 Southbound
West Sussex	Crawley	33.1; 33.4	53.3; 53.8	11 (Note: 51.0864°N 0.1969°W)	Pease Pottage services A23 - Brighton, Crawley A264 - Horsham	Road continues as A23 to Brighton
1.000 mi = 1.609 km; 1.000 km = 0.621 mi: Incomplete access

Coordinate list

== In popular culture ==
The rivalry between Brighton & Hove Albion and Crystal Palace football clubs is often referred to as the M23 Derby.

The M23 is the only motorway in Sussex.
