= North Cross Route =

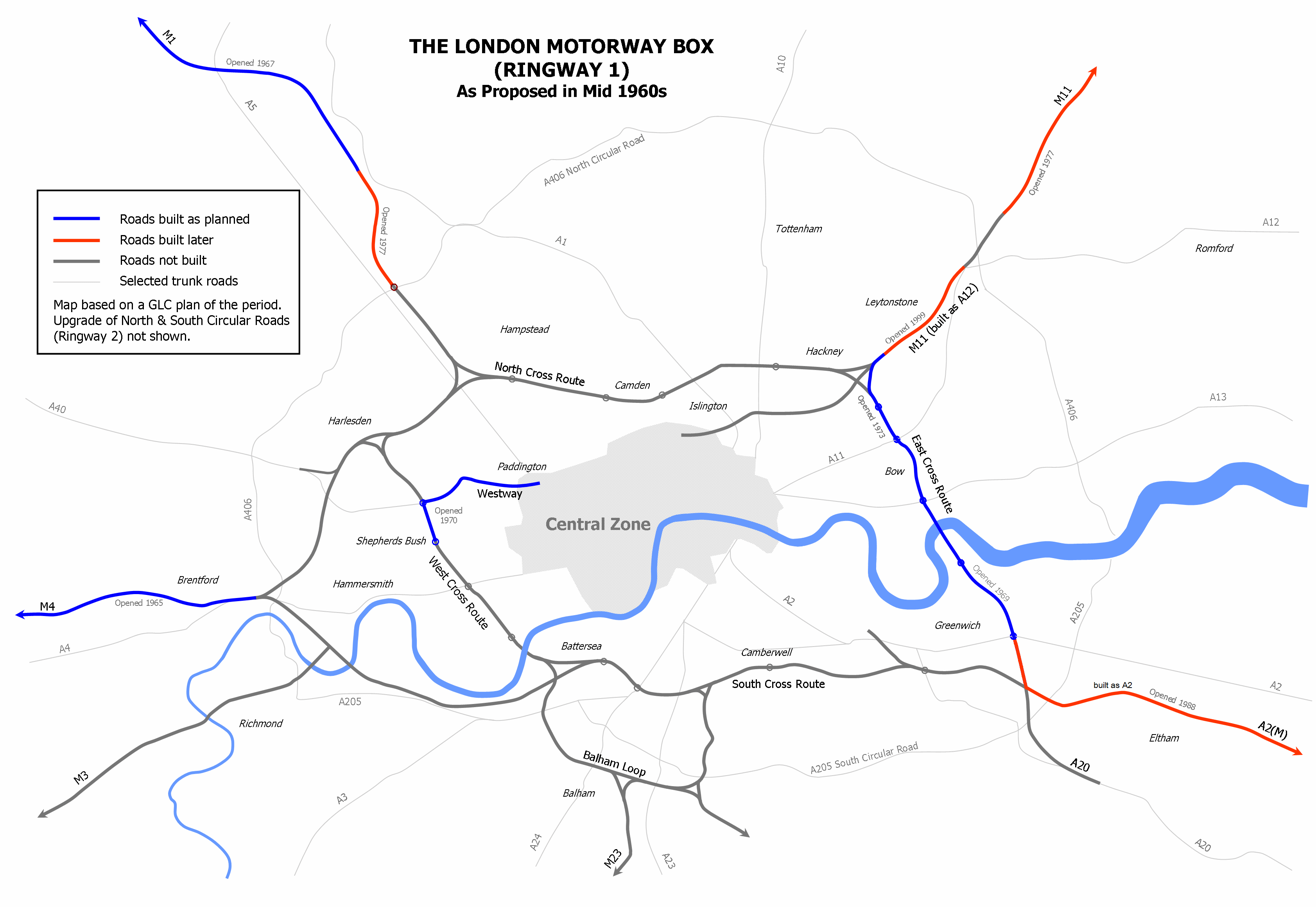
Plan of the London Motorway Box scheme from mid 1960s showing the North Cross Route

North Cross Route (NCR) was a planned motorway-standard road which would have formed the northern section of Ringway 1 (London Motorway Box) and would have formed the innermost circuit of the London Ringways network. The six-lane dual carriageway with grade separated junctions to an extended M1 motorway was planned during the late 1960s along with the rest of the Ringway scheme. It was never constructed due to large-scale opposition from many quarters.

== Route ==
The NCR would have started in Harlesden with its western end having a junction to the east of Willesden Junction station with the West Cross Route, the western section of Ringway 1 coming north from Shepherd's Bush. Also connected to the junction here would have been Harrow Road (A404) and a spur from the NCR would have connected to the Western Avenue (A40) near Gypsy Corner.

Heading east, the NCR would have run in a cutting along the north side of the North London Line to Brondesbury and Kilburn High Road (A5). To accommodate the motorway cutting, most of the houses on the south side of the roads lining the railway would have been demolished. Roads that crossed the railway line, such as Willesden Lane, would have also bridged the sunken motorway.

Between Kilburn High Road and West End Lane a major Y-shaped junction would have been constructed where the NCR was to meet the intended end of the M1 motorway. This was originally planned to be continued south of its Staples Corner junction with the North Circular Road (Ringway 2) along the east side of the Midland Main Line through Cricklewood. The M1 junction would have been provided with slip roads allowing traffic movements between the M1 and NCR in each direction and the NCR would also have been provided with additional lanes between this junction and a roundabout to have been built at Finchley Road (A41) between Finchley Road and Finchley Road & Frognall stations.

East of Finchley Road there were three alternative routes towards Camden Town:

1. The NCR would have entered a cut-and-cover tunnel heading south-west through the western part of Belsize Park before returning into open air south of Eton Avenue and then crossing over Adelaide Road to follow the West Coast Main Line the short distance to Chalk Farm then crossing above a British Rail goods yard there and heading east along the railway to central Camden Town to rejoin the North London Line.
2. The NCR would have continued to follow the North London Line through Gospel Oak and then south through Kentish Town to Camden Town.
3. The NCR would have continued to follow the North London Line to Gospel Oak but switched there to follow the Midland Main Line to avoid central Camden Town and rejoin the North London line near York Way.

Despite the destruction involved in constructing the tunnel through Belsize Park, the preferred route appears to have been alternative 1 as this provided the best means of creating an interchange with the planned Camden Town by-pass which would have connected Albany Street (south-west of Camden Town) to Camden Road (north-east of Camden Town).

East of Camden Town, the NCR would have continued to follow the north side of the North London Line to Caledonian Road (A5203), where another junction would have been provided, then through Highbury and Canonbury to Dalston where the NCR would have passed over Kingsland High Street (A10) and along Ridley Road Market before a further junction would have been built to connect to the High Street and Dalston Lane. The final section of the NCR would have crossed through Hackney town centre parallel with the railway viaduct, passing south of 16th century Sutton House, East London's oldest house, and on through Homerton and Hackney Wick where it would have interchanged with the East Cross Route coming north from Bow, the proposed M11 motorway coming south-west from Leyton and a motorway heading south-west towards Angel. To facilitate this complex junction the North London line was diverted to a new route through Hackney Wick.

== History ==
The NCR and the other roads planned in the 1960s for central London had developed from early schemes prior to World War II through Sir Patrick Abercrombie's County of London Plan, 1943 and Greater London Plan, 1944 to a 1960s Greater London Council (GLC) scheme that would have involved the construction of many miles of motorway standard roads across the city and demolition on a massive scale. Due to the huge construction costs and widespread public opposition, the GLC had dropped the NCR from the Ringway Plans by 1972 and most of the rest of the scheme was cancelled in 1973. Only the East Cross Route, part of the West Cross Route and the Westway were built.

== See also ==
- South Cross Route
- Homes before Roads

== Bibliography ==
- Asher, Wayne. 2018. Rings Around London - Orbital Motorways and The Battle For Homes Before Roads. ISBN 978-1-85414-421-8
