= M16 motorway =

Proposed road in England

Coordinates: 51.6861°N 0.2012°W

M16

Route information
- Length: 52 mi (84 km)
- Status: Cancelled
- History: Proposed 1960s; started construction in 1973; later used for part of the M25.

Location
- Country: United Kingdom
- Constituent country: England

Road network
- Roads in the United Kingdom; Motorways; A and B road zones

The M16 motorway was the designation planned in the late 1960s and early 1970s for use on Ringway 3, a new motorway planned as part of the London Ringways Plan to run a circular route around London.

Construction of the first section of the M16 began in 1973 between South Mimms and Potters Bar in Hertfordshire and opened in September 1975 with the temporary general purpose road designation A1178. During construction of the first section of the motorway, the majority of the Ringways plan was cancelled and, in 1975 the plans for Ringway 3 were modified to combine it with parts of another motorway, Ringway 4, the outermost Ringway.

The M16 designation was dropped and the combined motorway was given the designation M25 which had originally been intended for the southern and western part of Ringway 4. The section of Ringway 3 west of South Mimms anti-clockwise around London to Swanley in Kent was cancelled and the section clockwise from Potters Bar to the Dartford Tunnel was constructed between 1979 and 1982. The section of Ringway 3 south of the river between Dartford and Swanley was constructed between 1974 and 1977.

The South Mimms junction was originally intended to be the end of a short spur connecting the A1 to the M16. The main alignment of the M16 would have continued south-west of the junction towards Radlett and Bushey. Evidence of this unbuilt alignment remains in the wide gap between the carriageways to the east of the South Mimms junction which would have been the point at which the spur would have separated from the continuing carriageway.
