= East Cross Route =

Road in East London

Coordinates: 51.53734°N 0.02566°W

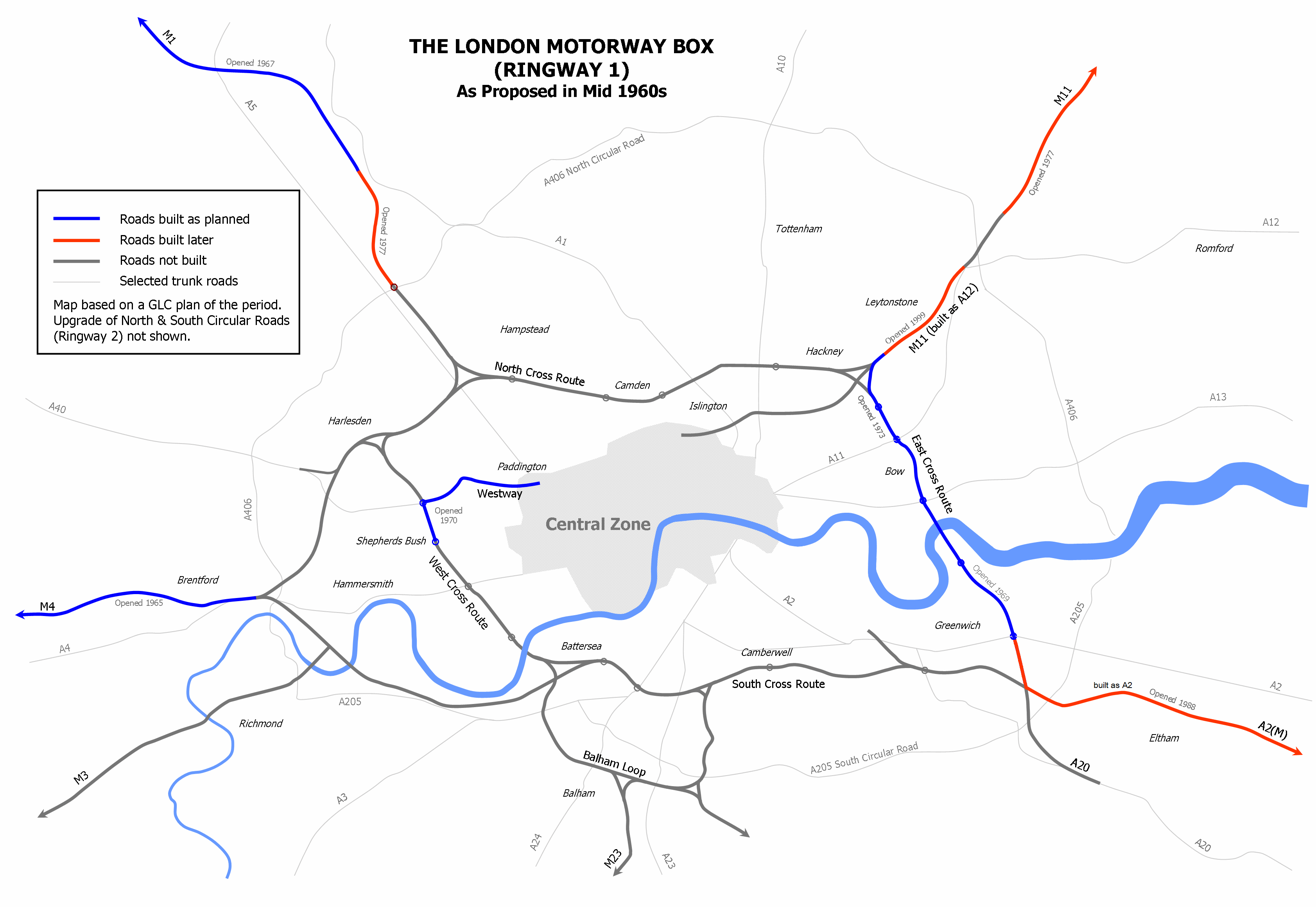
Ringways scheme showing the East Cross Route

The East Cross Route (ECR) is a dual carriageway road constructed in east London as part of the uncompleted Ringway 1 as part of the London Ringways plan drawn up during the 1960s to create a series of high speed roads circling and radiating out from central London. The road was constructed between 1967 and 1973 and runs from Hackney Wick in north-east London, through the Blackwall Tunnel, to Kidbrooke in south-east London. The ECR was initially designated as part of the A102, but has, subsequently, been partially renumbered so that sections of it are now the A2 and A12.

== Route ==
At its northern end, the ECR (A12) follows part of the route of the former North London Railway between the closed Victoria Park and Old Ford stations. The railway junction at Victoria Park, where the still open section of the North London Line to Stratford station diverged, was reconstructed to permit the construction of the junction with the non-dual carriageway section of the A102 and the A106 and A115 roads, above which the line passes. The branch track to the docks that ran alongside the ECR to Old Ford, which had been used only for freight since the 1940s, was subsequently closed and lifted in the early 1980s.

At Bow Road, the junction with the A11 involves a triple-layer junction, Bow Interchange. The ECR passes through in a cutting below an interchange roundabout whilst the A11 passes above on a flyover. South of this junction, the ECR passes Bromley-by-Bow station and skirts the River Lee Navigation for a short distance as it follows the line of the former St Leonard Street. It then crosses Limehouse Cut and continues along what was Brunswick Road to East India Dock Road (A13). It passes under the A13 in another grade separated junction, becoming the A102, and then enters the Blackwall tunnel.

South of the River Thames, the ECR (A102) skirts Tunnel Avenue and flies over Blackwall Lane (A2203) and Woolwich Road (A206) before climbing the hill towards the Sun-in-the-Sands interchange where it passes under Shooters Hill Road (A2/A207) and becomes the Rochester Way Relief Road (A2). It squeezes through the tight space between Rochester Way (the old A2 route) and Woolacombe Road before it ends at the Kidbrooke interchange where it connects to Kidbrooke Park Road (A2213) or continues as the later section of the Rochester Way Relief Road built in the 1980s.

== History ==
The ECR and the other roads planned in the 1960s for central London which formed Ringway 1 of the London Ringways scheme had developed from early schemes prior to the Second World War through Sir Patrick Abercrombie's County of London Plan, 1943 and Greater London Plan, 1944 to a 1960s Greater London Council (GLC) scheme that would have involved the construction of many miles of motorway standard roads across the city and demolition on a massive scale. Due to the huge construction costs and widespread public opposition, most of the scheme was cancelled in 1973 and the ECR and the West Cross Route and Westway in west London were the only significant parts to be built.

At the northern end of the ECR, the unrealised plans would have seen it connect at Hackney Wick to the unbuilt North Cross Route which would have run west across north London via Dalston, and also to the M11 motorway which was originally planned to continue south from its current starting point at the North Circular Road (A406) in South Woodford) to join Ringway 1. Part of this plan was eventually achieved in a modified form when, in the 1990s the 'A12 Hackney to M11 link road', or 'M11 Link Road' was constructed through Leyton, Leytonstone and Wanstead to connect to the ECR at Hackney Wick. This extension was designated as the A12 and required just the sort of controversial construction methods and widescale demolitions of residential areas that caused the 1960s schemes to be cancelled and provoked to the major M11 link road protest. After the new road was built, the northern part of the ECR became the A12.

Had the North Cross Route been built incoming traffic from the M11 would have been able to continue west from Hackney Wick junction on a motorway standard road past Dalston, Highbury, Camden Town, under West Hampstead to Kilburn (where a link to the M1 would have been built) and then west to Harlesden, where it would have connected with the West Cross Route, running south to connect with the A40, A4 and on to cross the Thames to connect with the South Cross Route.

Also at Hackney Wick a route was proposed running across Victoria Park to Bethnal Green; it would have then run over the Regent Canal to finish at the Angel, Islington, here it would have met the A1 road.

It is probable that this road would have been named "Eastway" to form a pair with the Westway now which performs a similar function from Paddington to White City and, in fact, a short section of road adjacent to the ECR north of the Hackney Wick junction does bear this name today.

At the southern end of the ECR, the plan was to connect it at Kidbrooke to the South Cross Route (running west across south London), the A2 (heading east out of London) and the A20 (heading south-east out of London). In fact, a new dual carriageway section of the A2 was constructed through Eltham to meet the ECR at Kidbrooke in the 1980s providing an efficient route out of London in this direction and the A20 passes only about 0.5 miles (0.80 km) to the south although it does not connect directly to the ECR and it was never upgraded to the motorway standard road that was intended.

Without the construction of the other parts of the 1960s motorway plans the context of the ECR has been lost in the subsequent road renumbering and the only section of the East Cross Route which continues to carry the name is the former northern motorway section of the route in Hackney Wick.

Parts of the route, at the northern end between Hackney Wick and Old Ford and south of the river between the Blackwall Tunnel and the Sun-in-the-Sands interchange, were previously classified as urban motorways and given the designation A102(M). The status was downgraded to a standard A-road in 2000 when responsibility for trunk roads in Greater London was transferred from the Highways Agency to the Greater London Authority.

== See also ==
- Homes before Roads
