= Sun in the Sands =

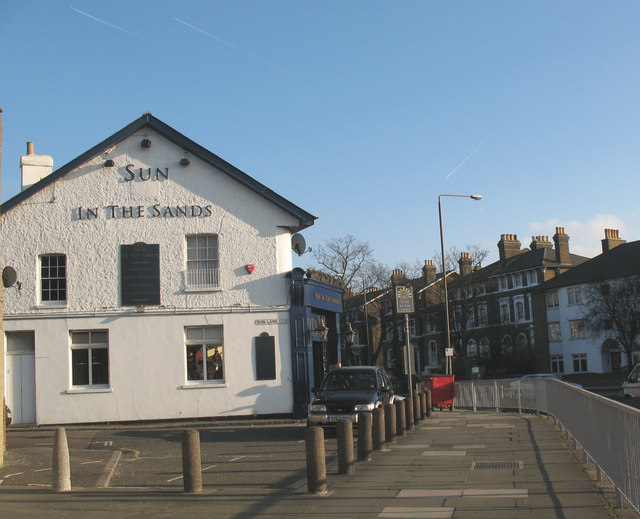
- The pub in 2007

- Location within Royal Borough of Greenwich Location within Greater London

General information
- Type: Public house
- Location: Blackheath, London, England
- Coordinates: 51°28′30″N 0°1′30″E
- Construction started: 1745; 281 years ago

Website
- www.suninthesandspub.co.uk

The Sun in the Sands was a pub-restaurant between Blackheath and Shooter's Hill in London. It lends its name to the adjacent junction, where the A2 between central London and north Kent meets the A102, which notably, to the north, provides access to the Blackwall Tunnel. Several Transport for London (TfL) bus routes pass the former simple crossroads.

== History ==
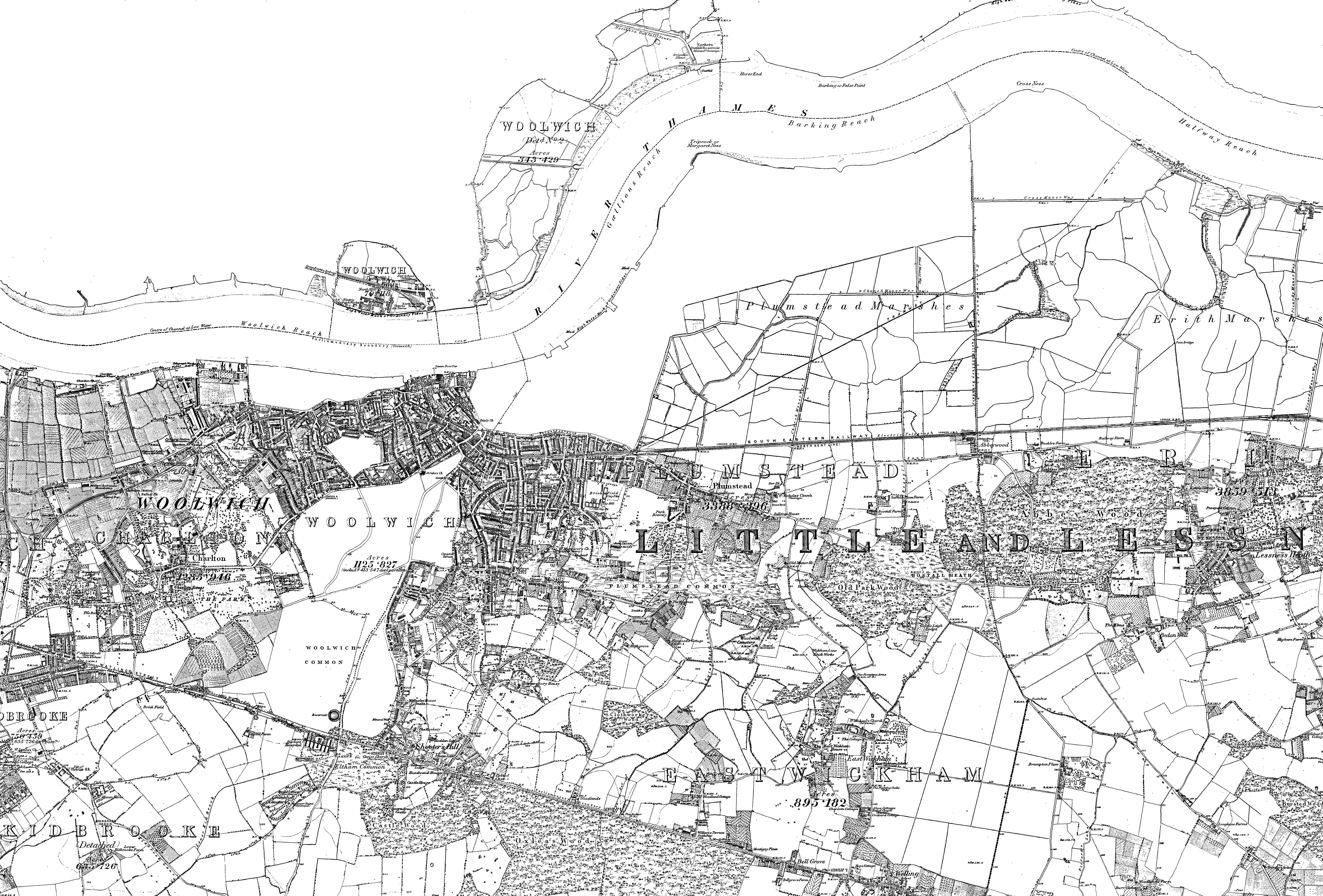
The site in about 1880. Click for broader map and to enable varied magnification.

The upland heath, ridge, to the east was a meeting point since the Middle Ages, and was, in widespread recountings, a stopover of King Henry VIII when riding from Greenwich to Shooter's Hill with his first Queen and several Lords. The present pub dates from around 1745 and its name comes from the sight of the setting sun amidst dust, kicked up by sheep herded by drovers from Kent headed to London. It was soon an isolated inn on heathland, frequented by highwaymen in one period known as "the Trojans", who regularly pickpocketed. William Hazlitt was known to visit the inn.

The junction was built in stages, due to various 20th-century projects to bypass the old Roman Road between Blackheath and Dartford. The modern A2, parallel to this, forms the Shooters Hill By-Pass which took most of the 1920s to complete. The modern roundabout with side sliproad dates from the late 1960s.

As well as the junction, the pub inspired the name of Sunfields Methodist Church and the adjacent Sun Lane, a former caravan repair site which now hosts a garage; it was previously a tiny passage, Sun-in-the-Sands Lane.

Since 1995, Greenwich Council has protected the appearance of a zone east of the junction, including the pub, as a Conservation Area, defined as an area "of special architectural or historic interest, the character or appearance of which it is desirable to preserve or enhance."
