= A102 road =

Road in London, England

A102

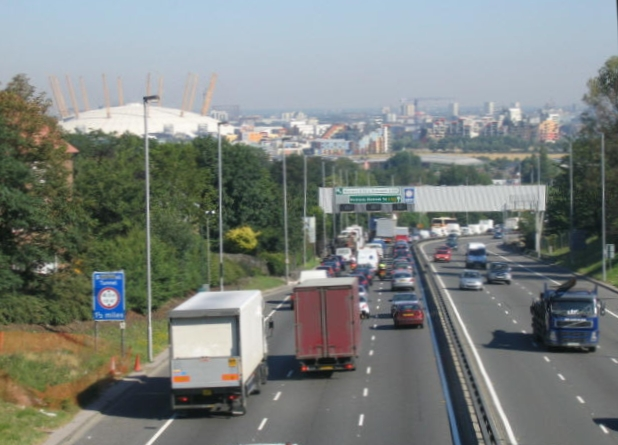
- Northbound rush hour traffic on the A102 with the Millennium Dome in the background

Section 1
- Length: 1.1 mi (1.8 km)
- north end: A107 in Clapton; 51.5509°N 0.0514°W

- south end: A106 in Hackney Wick; 51.5452°N 0.0356°W

Section 2
- Length: 3.3 mi (5.3 km)
- north end: A12 in Blackwall; 51.5133°N 0.00821°W
- Major intersections: A13 A2203 A1020 A206 A207
- south end: A2 in Blackheath; 51.4731°N 0.0256°E

Location
- Country: United Kingdom
- Constituent country: England

Road network
- Roads in the United Kingdom; Motorways; A and B road zones
| ← A101 | → A103 |

The A102 is a road starting in Clapton, east London, and ends by merging into the A2 road just south of the Sun in the Sands roundabout in Blackheath, south-east London. The total length of the road (including both sections) is approximately 4.4 miles (7.1 km).

== History ==
The section of the former A102 now designated as the A12 and the two sections of the A102(M) were all constructed in the mid- and late-1960s as part of the East Cross Route which was intended to be the eastern section of the Ringway 1 (also known as the London Motorway Box), an ambitious and controversial Greater London Council plan to surround London with high speed roads – known as the London Ringways – which was eventually cancelled.

When the A12 extension was opened through Wanstead, Leytonstone and Leyton to meet the north end of the East Cross Route at the Lea Interchange (and prompting the M11 link road protest), the northern section of the A102(M) and the A102 as far south as the A13 were renumbered A12. The southern section of the A102(M) was reclassified as a general purpose road when Transport for London was given control of trunk roads in Greater London in 1999.
