= M15 motorway (Great Britain) =

Cancelled road in the United Kingdom

M15

Route information
- Length: 1 mi (1.6 km)
- Status: Cancelled
- History: Proposed 1960s; cancelled.

Location
- Country: United Kingdom

Road network
- Roads in the United Kingdom; Motorways; A and B road zones

The M15 motorway was the designation planned in the late 1960s and early 1970s for use on the North Circular Road (A406) after it had been upgraded to motorway standard. The upgrade was part of the London Ringways Plan to build motorways throughout London to ease congestion in the central area. Under the Ringways Plan, the North Circular Road was the northern section of Ringway 2.

Most of the Ringways Plan was cancelled in 1973 and the upgrade of the A406 took place in a piecemeal fashion during the following three decades. Although much of the road is now grade-separated dual carriageways, the improvements have not been carried out to motorway standards and there are still a number of sub-standard sections and many junctions with minor roads.

One section of the M15 was constructed in the early 1970s in conjunction with the M11 motorway. The section of A406 between M11 junction 4 and the Redbridge interchange with the A12 was signed as the southern end of the M11 and the Redbridge junction was signed as M11 junction 3. This was a temporary "virtual" designation to avoid driver confusion, because, at the time of opening, although it was legally part of the M15, traffic entering this section of road northbound from the Redbridge Roundabout could continue only onto the M11 and traffic heading southbound on the M11 could enter only the section to Redbridge.

As the A406 motorway upgrade was not constructed, the designation has never been officially signed and the M15 was abolished when the A406 Redbridge to A13 road was opened.
