= County of London Plan =

1943 development plan in England

- Author: Patrick Abercrombie and J.H. Forshaw
- Language: English
- Subject: Urban planning
- Publisher: Macmillan and Company Ltd
- Publication date: 1943
- Publication place: United Kingdom
- Media type: Print (Hardback)
- Pages: 188

The County of London Plan was an urban planning proposal prepared for the London County Council in 1943 by John Henry Forshaw (1895–1973) and Sir Leslie Patrick Abercrombie (1879–1957), with foreword from Charles Latham, leader of the council. Its main purpose was to point out the main directions of development and reconstruction of London, which in the past decades had faced large changes and irregular growth. It was prepared in anticipation of the end of World War II and the reconstruction after bomb damage and large movements of population.

It focused on five problems, for which it proposed solutions:

- traffic congestion
- depressed housing
- inadequacy and maldistribution of open spaces
- jumble of houses and industries
- sprawl, and suburbanisation of surrounding country towns

== Plan ==
=== Ring roads ===
One of the solutions was to create ring roads around the capital. Construction would have involved considerable disruption, even through parts of the city damaged by bombs, and the roads were not built, but the "C Ring" (the third ring out from the city centre) was to include what is now the South Circular Road. The plan to build a high-quality road was not realised, but the semi-circular route was assigned to existing roads through the southern suburbs. A similar plan was reintroduced in the 1960s under the name of the London Ringways.

==== Predecessors ====
In 1905, the Royal Commission on London Traffic issued a report recommending improvements to road, tram and rail services including a "circular road about 75 miles in length at a radius of 12 miles from St Paul's".

In 1937, the Ministry of Transport published The Highway Development Survey by Sir Edwin Lutyens and Sir Charles Bressey, which reviewed London's road needs and recommended the construction of many miles of new roads and the improvement of junctions at key congestion areas. Among the proposals was a series of orbital roads around the city with the outer ones built as American-style parkways, which are wide, landscaped roads with limited access and grade-separated junctions.

=== Railway services ===
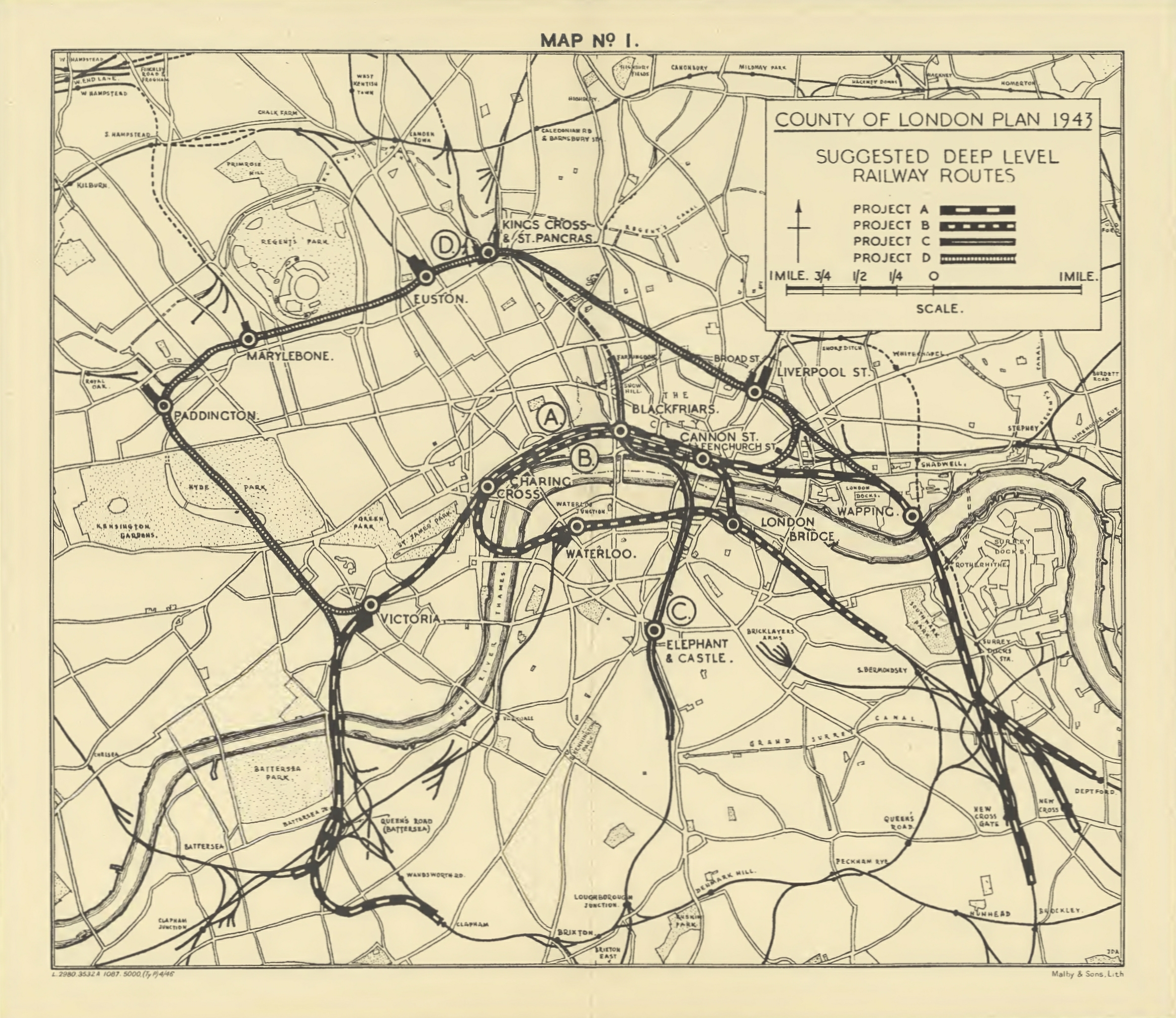
Map showing the County of London Plan's four deep level underground rail routes

The report recommended electrification of all rail routes and removal of elevated viaducts, with the elimination of railway bridges crossing the Thames being a key priority. It was hoped that the removal of the river bridges would enable the redevelopment of the South Bank.

The proposals included a highly ambitious system of two-track bored rail tunnels in loop-shaped routes beneath built-up areas, large enough to handle mainline trains. These tunnels would provide a tube-like service, but without the need to change from a mainline train to a tube train. As a result, some tube routes would be transformed into freight-only routes, with the northern portion of the Circle line specifically mentioned in this consideration.

The proposed railway tunnels would have been as follows:

- North Bank Loop: along the north bank of the Thames, from Battersea, to Victoria, Charing Cross, Cannon Street, Shadwell (where a section of line would run at surface level using existing tracks), and thence through a tunnel to Wapping, Surrey Docks, and Deptford. The various mainline stations on the north bank of the Thames would no longer be served by open-air tracks over viaducts and bridges.
- South-east, City and West End Loop: proposed as a means of eliminating the railway bridges across the Thames and associated viaducts. It would go via Charing Cross, Cannon Street, Waterloo Junction, and London Bridge, rising to the surface in the vicinity of the Surrey Canal, where it would be connected to existing mainline tracks.
- North-South Tunnel: from Herne Hill in the south through Blackfriars, connecting with King's Cross in the north. Blackfriars and Elephant & Castle would be replaced by sub-surface stations.
- Northern Arc: connecting Paddington, Marylebone, Euston, King's Cross, and Liverpool Street.

An “Inner Ring” and an “Outer Ring” of freight-only railways was also proposed:

- Inner Goods Ring: the northern segments of the Inner Circle (today the Circle line) would be converted to a freight-only line, and a continuation through the southern areas of London (Battersea is mentioned) to form a circular line.
- Outer Goods Ring: an arc across the northern parts of London, running substantially to the north of, and parallel to, Euston Road. It is not clear whether this would be at surface level or in a tunnel, although a tunnel under the Thames at Greenwich has been mentioned.

These proposals were further reported on in May 1946 by the Railway (London Plan) Committee, which had been appointed by the Minister of War Transport in February 1944. It was chaired by Sir Charles Inglis. The committee concluded that the cost and time required to carry out the recommendations of the London plan meant that the proposals would not be achievable in a short period of time and could not be carried out until adequate alternative capacity could be provided. Of the four central proposals the one supported by the committee was the North-South Tunnel. The 1946 report recommended a dozen new routes totalling over 100 miles, estimated to cost £230m and take at least 30 years to build. Among them were 'route 8', from East Croydon to Finsbury Park, in tunnel from Norbury via Streatham, Brixton and the Victoria line route, except Victoria-Hyde Park Corner-Bond St-Euston.

== Exhibition ==
The first exhibition displaying the plan, in County Hall, was attended by 54,732 people. The second exhibition displaying the plan, in the Royal Academy of Arts, was attended by 21,865 people.

== See also ==
- Greater London Plan
- Park system
- Landscape planning
- North Circular Road- the north London counterpart of the South Circular Road
- M25 London Orbital Motorway- the outermost London ring, completed in 1986
