= Thames foot tunnel =

Thames foot tunnel may refer to the following tunnels under the River Thames in London:

- Woolwich foot tunnel, between Woolwich and North Woolwich
- Greenwich foot tunnel, between Greenwich and Millwall
- Thames Tunnel, between Wapping and Rotherhithe, used as a pedestrian tunnel before 1869

== See also ==
- Tunnels underneath the River Thames
