= Thames Gateway Bridge =

Cancelled proposal for a river crossing in east London, England

Coordinates: 51°30′31″N 0°05′13″E

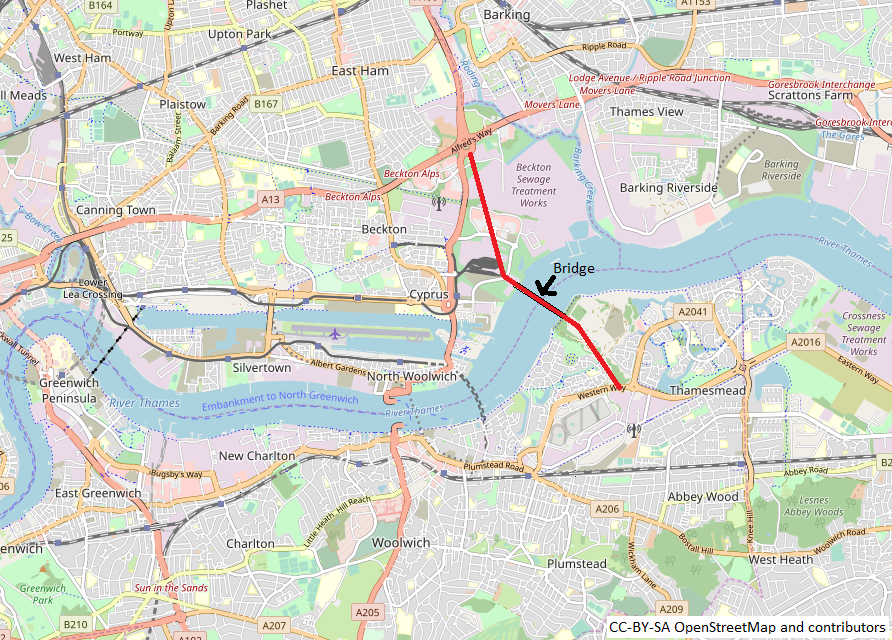
Map showing location of the proposed bridge

The Thames Gateway Bridge was a proposed crossing over the River Thames in east London, England. It was first mooted in the 1970s but never came to fruition. The concept was re-proposed in 2004, with preliminary planning proceeding until November 2008, when Boris Johnson, the Mayor of London, cancelled the entire £500 million scheme.

In 2009, a new scaled-down project on the same site, the Gallions Reach Crossing, was proposed, joined in 2015 by the Belvedere Crossing, until both proposals were cancelled in 2016. Despite several proposals being put forward, there would be no new road crossing between Tower Bridge and the Dartford Crossing until the Silvertown Tunnel was completed in 2025. The safeguarding for the bridge was lifted by Government in 2025.

== Description ==
It was planned that the bridge should be built by 2013 and would have connected Beckton in the London Borough of Newham with Thamesmead in the Royal Borough of Greenwich linking the A406/A13 junction in Beckton with the A2016 Eastern Way and Western Way in Thamesmead and serve the new Thames Gateway development.

The bridge was to have a span of about 650 metres (0.4 mi), with a 50-metre (160 ft) vertical clearance for ships but be low enough not to impede the flight approach to the nearby London City Airport. The bridge was to have had four lanes for general traffic and two lanes for public transport use. It would also have had a cycle lane, a pedestrian walkway and the facility for a Docklands Light Railway crossing.

For pedestrians the nearest other crossings are the Greenwich foot tunnel, the Woolwich foot tunnel and Woolwich Ferry, or the Docklands Light Railway, from King George V station under the river to Woolwich Arsenal station, which opened in early 2009.

For vehicles, the nearest other Thames crossings are the Blackwall Tunnel and adjacent Silvertown Tunnel (A102), the Dartford Crossing (A282) and the Woolwich Ferry.

== History ==
=== Background ===
The design and the location were similar to the East London River Crossing, which was proposed and approved by two public inquiries from the 1970s to the 1990s but subsequently dropped by the Department for Transport.

=== Consultation ===
In July 2004, a new bridge on the site was proposed, with planning applications submitted by Transport for London (TfL) to the London Borough of Newham and London Borough of Greenwich, with the support of Ken Livingstone, the Mayor of London. and were approved in December 2004. There was support from the other local councils including Barking & Dagenham, Havering and Lewisham, some local Members of Parliament, and business organisations such as London First and the London Development Agency.

A public inquiry on the scheme sat at Charlton Athletic F.C. from June 2005 to May 2006.

The inspector recorded, prior to the inquiry, 2,949 objections and 47 expressions of support. It drew organised opposition from a number of environmental groups, including Friends of the Earth; they joined a local opposition group to argue against the bridge at the inquiry. During the inquiry, a further 1,819 written representations were received opposed to the proposed development and nine in support; 22 objections were withdrawn during the Inquiries. Their objections were mainly as follows:

- that the proposed developments did not conform to the Development Plan for the area or to national planning guidance and that and there were more acceptable ways in which the benefits aimed at by the proposed development could be achieved,
- that in reality development was the first phase a larger strategic road scheme and would not deliver the regeneration benefit claimed,
- that the tolling arrangements were unacceptable and that the traffic modelling was inadequate
- that the scheme would result in unacceptable levels of traffic, air pollution, noise pollution and would impact on wildlife and nature conservation and
- that the public consultation process had been inadequate.

=== Negative Decision ===
A decision was announced in July 2007, with the planning inspector noting that the requirements of both local and national planning needs would not be served by the granting of planning permission for the bridge. He recommended that there should be no bridge, side street changes, or compulsory purchase orders.

=== Reopening Inquiry ===
However Hazel Blears, the Secretary of State for Communities and Local Government, requested that the inquiry be re-opened to examine the evidence further as to whether the bridge would lead to regeneration and to investigate the potential impact on pollution.

Ken Livingstone said that "any delay to the Thames Gateway bridge is a blow to east London, and south-east London in particular" and that "the reopening of the public inquiry will delay bringing the benefits of the Thames Gateway bridge to an area that sorely needs them. This new crossing is crucial to supporting plans for an extra 160,000 houses in the Thames Gateway region and up to 42,000 additional jobs in the area as whole."

It was reported in May 2008 that the new London Mayor, Boris Johnson, planned to put the bridge project on hold.

On 6 November 2008, Johnson announced a "massive investment in transport infrastructure" but confirmed the cancellation of the £500m bridge. The reasons cited for cancellation included local opposition, insufficient funding, projected detrimental effects on traffic flow and concerns over the bridge's location and environmental impact. It was also independently confirmed that the public inquiry would not reopen.

In October 2009, it was reported that consultants Mott MacDonald had won a contract to investigate the possibility of new crossings between Tower Bridge and the Dartford Crossing.

Despite having abandoned the bridge the previous year and saying he favoured a tunnel crossing at Silvertown, Johnson resurrected the project, renamed Gallions Reach Crossing, as a lower capacity crossing that could start as a ferry service but could be upgraded to a fixed link later.

In 2023, as part of a consultation into the extension of the Docklands Light Railway to Thamesmead – TfL affirmed that they had no plans to deliver a road bridge in the area, and that they would "explore the removal of the [bridge] safeguarding" as it "conflicts with the vision for new homes, jobs and high-quality town centres". The DLR extension would instead provide a cross-river link in the area. In 2025, Government formally lifted the safeguarding for the bridge.

== Location ==
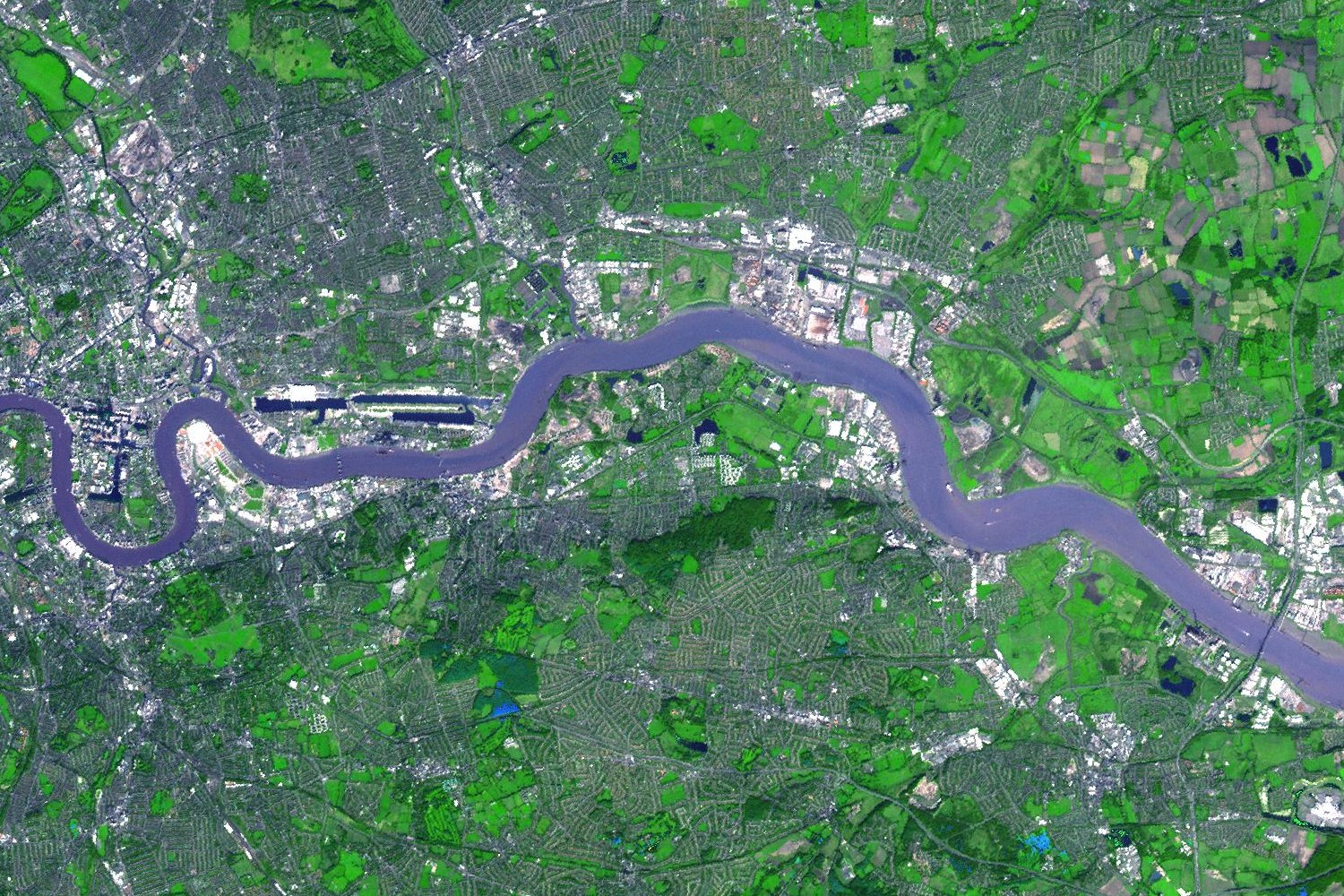

This annotated satellite photograph shows the location of the proposed bridge, the nearest upstream and downstream road crossings and nearby towns and areas of interest.

== See also ==
- Lower Thames Crossing, a 2009 proposal, still ongoing, for a new crossing somewhere in the Dartford and Gravesend area.

== Bibliography ==
- Asher, Wayne. 2018. Rings Around London - Orbital Motorways and The Battle For Homes Before Roads. ISBN 978-1-85414-421-8
