= Docklands Light Railway extension to Thamesmead =

Proposed Docklands Light Railway (DLR) extension

Overview
- Status: Proposed
- Locale: London Borough of Newham; Royal Borough of Greenwich
- Termini: Gallions Reach; Thamesmead
- Stations: 2

Service
- Type: Light metro
- System: Docklands Light Railway

History
- Planned opening: 2033

Technical
- Track gauge: 4 ft 8 1/2 in (1,435 mm) standard gauge

The Docklands Light Railway extension to Thamesmead is a proposed Docklands Light Railway (DLR) extension to serve the Beckton Riverside and Thamesmead redevelopment areas of East London.

The extension was first formally proposed by Transport for London (TfL) in 2019, with proposed stations at Beckton Riverside and Thamesmead. Public consultation on the project began in 2023. In November 2025, the HM Treasury gave approval in the November budget for TfL and the Greater London Authority (GLA) to be loaned money to build the extension. Estimated to cost around £1.6bn, construction could start in 2029 and the extension could open in the "early 2030s".

== Project development ==
=== Background ===
Thamesmead, built on former marshland on the south bank of the River Thames in East London, was developed by the Greater London Council from the 1960s onwards to meet the demand from Londoners for social housing. As part of the initial development of the area in the 1970s, the area was intended to be served by the (then) Fleet line and an infill railway station at Church Manor Way. However, plans for the railway station never came to fruition, and the Jubilee line was only extended to Stratford in 1999, with passive provision at North Greenwich for a second branch which would have a route to Thamesmead via the former North London line to North Woolwich, which itself is now used by the Elizabeth line. As a result of these developments, Thamesmead remains not directly served by railway services of any kind, with the closest stations being Plumstead, Abbey Wood and Belvedere. Furthermore, the area is in the centre of a 22 kilometres (14 mi) gap in major road crossings of the River Thames – with planned road crossings at nearby Gallions Reach and Belvedere never built.

Limited passive provision is present in the Docklands Light Railway extension to Woolwich Arsenal for a junction to Thamesmead as of 2005, however following the cancellation of the Docklands Light Railway extension to Dagenham Dock and the Thames Gateway Bridge in 2008, TfL considered other ways to assist with the development of the Beckton Riverside and Thamesmead areas throughout the 2010s. Options proposed included:

- new downstream river crossings such as the Silvertown Tunnel, Gallions Reach Crossing and Belvedere Crossing
- an extension of Crossrail east of Abbey Wood
- dedicated high frequency bus services – similar to the Greenwich Waterfront Transit proposal cancelled in 2009
- an extension of the Gospel Oak to Barking line south from Barking Riverside
- an extension of the DLR east from Beckton.

Following the approval of the Silvertown Tunnel in 2018, local campaigners pushed for public transport improvements in the area. In March 2018, the Mayor's Transport Strategy proposed an extension of the DLR towards Thamesmead and Barking town centre.

Plans for development in Thamesmead continued, with Peabody and Lendlease announcing an £8bn regeneration project in 2019 with over 11,500 new homes to be built. Developers on the south side of the river also pushed for development, with Aberdeen Standard Investments proposing the redevelopment of Gallions Reach Shopping Park.

=== Formal proposal ===
In December 2019, a DLR extension to Thamesmead was formally proposed by TfL as part of the draft Thamesmead and Abbey Wood OAPF, with proposed stations at Armada Riverside in Beckton and Thamesmead. An extension of the DLR was proposed instead of an extension of the Overground from Barking Riverside, as an Overground extension would have lower connectivity benefits, cost more to operate, have a low frequency of trains (4 per hour) and a construction cost twice as much as a DLR extension as the gradients required to cross the River Thames would require large scale tunnelling works when compared to the DLR.

In September 2020, the extension was included in the long term funding submission by TfL to HM Government. The document noted that the extension would cost around £800m, with completion between 2026 and 2030. Following adoption of the OAPF in late 2020, further feasibility and technical work began, funded wholly by landowners and local boroughs. In 2022, the extension was included in the draft London Borough of Newham Local Plan, which proposed "a new city district" at Beckton Riverside, connected by the extension.

In June 2023, the Strategic Outline Business Case for the extension was submitted to HM Government. It noted that a DLR extension to Thamesmead could allow between 25,000 and 30,000 homes to be constructed. Three options would be considered in the next stage:

- Bus rapid transit between Woolwich and Abbey Wood, around 6 kilometres (3.7 mi) in length
- DLR extension to a new station at Beckton Riverside, around 1 kilometre (0.62 mi) in length
- DLR extension with stations at Beckton Riverside and Thamesmead, a tunnel underneath the River Thames, around 3 kilometres (1.9 mi) in length

The business case noted that a DLR extension to Thamesmead could cost between £700 million to £1.2 billion, and could be completed in the 2030s. The next step would be seeking government funding to develop the scheme further, with a full business case submitted in 2025. In February 2024, TfL began public consultation on the project, proposing an extension of the DLR to Thamesmead via Beckton Riverside, as outlined in the business case. TfL noted that 75% of respondents supported the proposal. Further public consultation took place in June 2025.

In November 2025, HM Treasury gave approval in the November budget for TfL and the GLA to borrow the money required to build the extension.

On 4 February 2026, TfL announced that the cost for the extension will be £1.62 billion and construction will start in 2028 and be completed in the early 2030s. In June 2026, the programme was revised, with TfL saying construction could begin in 2029 subject to funding and approvals. In October 2026, Amey Rail was appointed to scope an early works package worth up to £42m.

== Route and stations ==
As of February 2024, the proposed route of the DLR extension would diverge off the Beckton branch just after Gallions Reach, turning east to pass around Beckton Depot before Beckton Riverside station in Beckton. The route would then continue to head southeast, tunnelling under the river before arriving at Thamesmead station. The 2024 consultation noted that the line could, in the future, be extended further to Belvedere or elsewhere in the London Borough of Bexley in the future.

Station locale	London borough
Beckton Riverside	Newham
Thamesmead	Greenwich

== Further extension proposals ==
In 2021, TfL noted that the DLR could be extended further in future, perhaps to Abbey Wood. In May 2024, Mayor of London Sadiq Khan stated the extension would be built in such a way as to enable future continuation of the route towards Belvedere.
