= Tunnels underneath the River Thames =

The table below lists many of the tunnels under the River Thames in and near London, which, thanks largely to its underlying bed of clay, is one of the most tunnelled cities in the world. The tunnels are used for road vehicles, pedestrians, Underground and railway lines and utilities. Several tunnels are over a century old: the original Thames Tunnel was the world's first underwater tunnel.

== List of tunnels ==
Name	Type	Between	Opened	Carries	Notes
Thames Cable Tunnel	Utility tunnel	Former Tilbury power station↔Eastcourt Marsh sealing end compound	1970	Power cable	1,675 metres (5,495 ft) long, carries two 400 kV circuits; depth 46 metres (151 ft), only accessible by authorised personnel
High Speed 1 tunnels	Railway tunnel	West Thurrock, Swanscombe	2007	High Speed 1	
Dartford Tunnel (eastern)	Road tunnel		May 1980	A282 road	
Dartford Tunnel (western)	Road tunnel		18 Nov 1963	A282 road, European route E15	
Dartford Cable Tunnel	Utility tunnel		2005	Power cable	
Barking cable tunnel	Utility tunnel	Barking, Thamesmead	1920s	Power cable	
Docklands Light Railway tunnel	Railway tunnel	King George V, Woolwich Arsenal	2009	Docklands Light Railway	
Crossrail tunnels	Railway tunnel	Woolwich, North Woolwich	2014	Elizabeth line	Tunnel construction completed in 2015; rail service began 24 May 2022.
Woolwich foot tunnel	Pedestrian tunnel	Woolwich, North Woolwich	26 Oct 1912	Footpath	The chief engineer was Maurice Fitzmaurice.
Thames Barrier	Flood barrier	Woolwich, North Woolwich	1984		Service tunnel only accessible by authorised personnel.
Millennium Dome cable tunnel	Utility tunnel	Millennium Dome, West Ham	1999	Power cable	2.8-metre (9 ft 2 in) diameter, only accessible by authorised personnel
Silvertown Tunnel	Road tunnel	London Borough of Newham	7 Apr 2025		Northbound and Southbound
Jubilee line tunnels	Railway tunnel	North Greenwich tube station, Canning Town station	1999	Jubilee line	
Blackwall Tunnel (eastern)	Road tunnel		2 Aug 1967	A102 road	
Blackwall Tunnel (western)	Road tunnel	London Borough of Tower Hamlets, Royal Borough of Greenwich	22 May 1897	A102 road	Engineer was Alexander Binnie.
Isle of Dogs Jubilee line tunnels	Railway tunnel	Canary Wharf, North Greenwich tube station	1999	Jubilee line	
Docklands Light Railway tunnel	Railway tunnel	Island Gardens, Cutty Sark for Maritime Greenwich	1999	Docklands Light Railway	
Greenwich foot tunnel	Pedestrian tunnel	Millwall, Greenwich	1899	Footpath	The chief engineer was Alexander Binnie.
Deptford cable tunnel	Utility tunnel	Deptford, Wapping		Power cable	
Jubilee line tunnels	Railway tunnel	Canada Water station, Canary Wharf	1999	Jubilee line	
Rotherhithe Tunnel	Road tunnel, pedestrian tunnel	Rotherhithe, Limehouse	12 Jun 1908	A101 road	The chief engineer was Maurice Fitzmaurice.
Thames Tunnel	Railway tunnel	Wapping, Rotherhithe	1843	East London line, London Overground	Marc Brunel. The world's first underwater tunnel, now part of the Overground network. Originally a foot tunnel.
New Cross to Finsbury Market Cable Tunnel	Utility tunnel	New Cross Substation - Wellclose Square Substation	2017	Power cable	
Tower Subway	Utility tunnel, tube railway, pedestrian tunnel		2 Aug 1870	Water pipe, optical fiber	Peter W. Barlow and James Henry Greathead. The world's first underground tube railway. A rail tunnel for 3 months only, then a foot tunnel. Currently carries pipes and fibre-optic lines.
Northern Line (Bank branch) tunnels	Railway tunnel	London Bridge tube station, Bank and Monument stations	1900	Northern line (Bank branch)	
City & South London Railway tunnels	Railway tunnel	Borough tube station, King William Street tube station	1890	City and South London Railway	Originally rail tunnels, now disused. The world's first electric tube railway, with tunnels only 10 feet 2 inches (3.10 m) in diameter, became disused in 1900 when new 11-foot-6-inch (3.51 m) tunnels to the east replaced them
Waterloo & City line tunnels	Railway tunnel	Bank and Monument stations, Waterloo tube station	1898	Waterloo & City line	
Bankside Cable Tunnel	Utility tunnel	Bankside, Blackfriars	1940s	Power cable	
Northern line (Charing Cross branch) tunnels	Railway tunnel	Waterloo tube station, Embankment tube station	1926	Northern line (Charing Cross branch)	
Bakerloo line tunnels	Railway tunnel	Waterloo tube station, Embankment tube station	1906	Bakerloo line	
Bankside–Charing Cross cable tunnel	Utility tunnel	Bankside substation to Charing Cross substation, partly runs beneath Hungerford Bridge		Power cable	
Jubilee Line Extension tunnels	Railway tunnel	Waterloo tube station, Westminster tube station	1999	Jubilee line	
Victoria line tunnels	Railway tunnel	Vauxhall tube station, Pimlico tube station	1971	Victoria line	
Wimbledon – Pimlico cable tunnel	Utility tunnel		1996	Power cable	
Battersea steam tunnel	Utility tunnel	Battersea, Pimlico	20th century	Water pipe	Used to carry steam under the Thames to the Churchill Gardens estate.
Battersea exhaust tunnels	Utility tunnel	Battersea, Pimlico	1920s		Two tunnels run under the Thames from the station and arrive on either side of Chelsea Bridge.
London Power Tunnels	Utility tunnel	Wimbledon, Kensal Green	2018, 2011	Power cable	

== Other tunnels ==
The figure and list above leaves out a tunnel to the site of the old Ferranti power station on the east side of the mouth of Deptford Creek.

There is also a tunnel between Cottons centre and the old Billingsgate Fish Market near to London Bridge. Citibank used it for cabling at one point; it was large enough for a person to walk through.

The Silvertown Tunnel opened on 7 April 2025.

The Thames Tideway Tunnel, due for completion in 2025, will be a 25 km (16 mi) long tunnel running mostly under the tidal section of the River Thames through central London to capture, store and convey almost all the raw sewage and rainwater that currently overflows into the river.

== Background ==
London's abundance of river tunnels has resulted from a number of factors. For historical reasons, the city centre has relatively few railway bridges. Only three railway bridges exist in central London, only one of which provides through services across the capital. Consequently, railway builders have had to tunnel under the river in the city centre rather than bridge it. By contrast, railway bridges are relatively common to the west of the inner city.

Another historical factor has been the presence of the Port of London, which until the 1980s required large ships to be able to access the river as far upstream as the City of London. Until the construction of the Queen Elizabeth II Bridge at Dartford in 1991, the easternmost bridge on the Thames was Tower Bridge in central London. Even now, the Dartford Crossing provides the only way to cross the Thames by road between London and the sea. The width of the river downstream meant that tunnels were the only options for crossings before improvements in technology allowed the construction of high bridges such as the Queen Elizabeth II Bridge.

== See also ==
- Crossings of the River Thames
- Subterranean London
