= London Buses route SL4 =

London Superloop express bus route

SL4
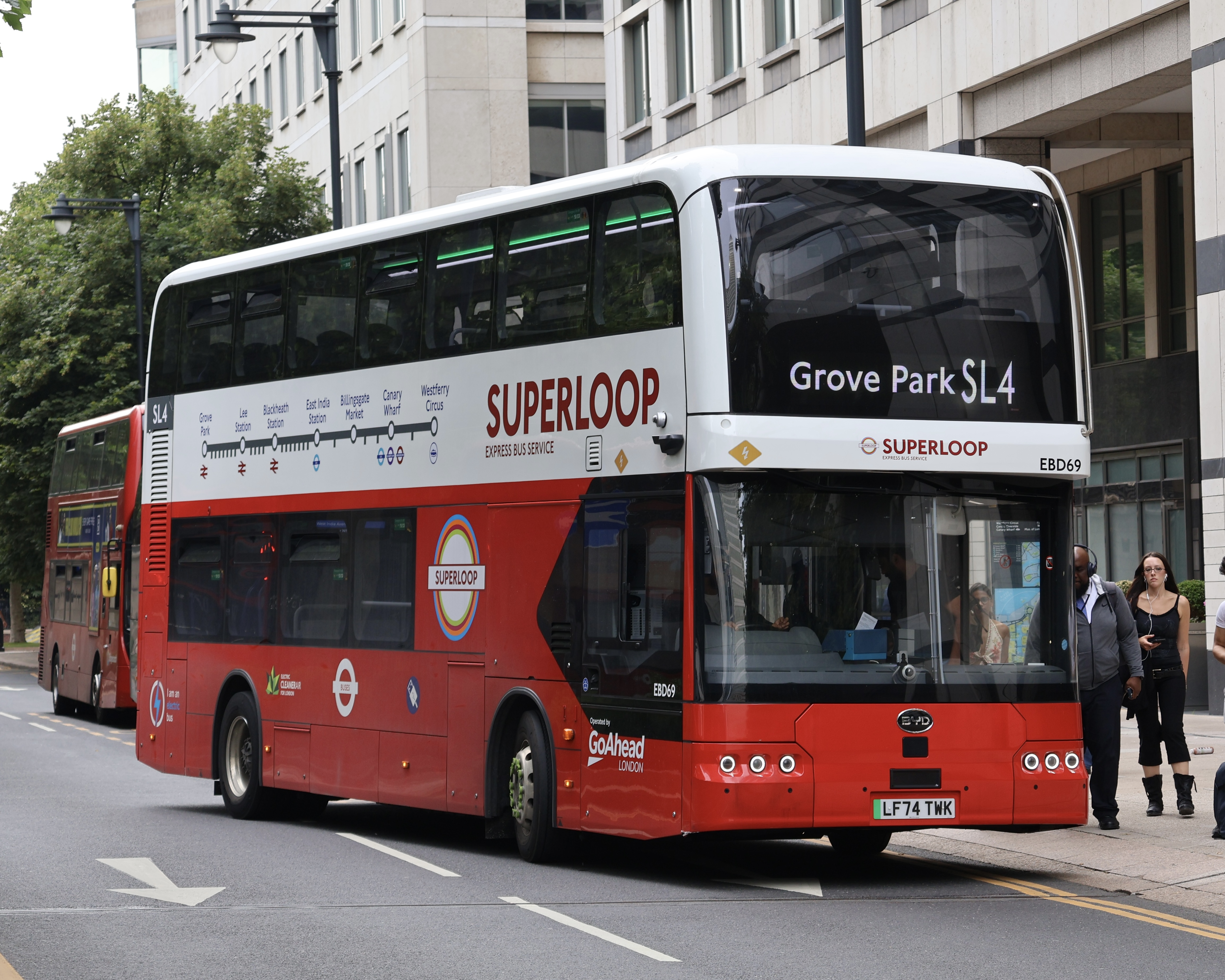
- Blue Triangle BYD BD11B in Canary Wharf in June 2025

Overview
- Operator: Blue Triangle (Go-Ahead London)
- Garage: Henley Road
- Vehicle: BYD BD11B
- Peak vehicle requirement: 18 (April 2025)
- Began service: 7 April 2025

Route
- Start: Grove Park
- Via: Lee; Blackheath; Leamouth; Canary Wharf
- End: Westferry Circus
- Length: 7 miles (11 km)

Service
- Level: Daily
- Frequency: Every 8-15 minutes
- Journey time: 38-63 minutes
- Operates: 05:00 until 01:34

London Buses route SL4 is a Transport for London contracted Superloop express bus route in London, England. Running between Grove Park and Westferry Circus, it is operated by Go-Ahead London subsidiary Blue Triangle.

The route is one of three bus routes to run through the Silvertown Tunnel, alongside route 129 and the Silvertown Tunnel cycle shuttle.

== History ==
The route was first proposed by Transport for London in November 2022 as part of the Silvertown Tunnel bus network. At the time of the consultation, the route was proposed to be numbered X239.

In March 2023, it was confirmed that the route would be introduced as planned and would also be included as part of the then proposed Superloop express bus network. In October 2023, it was confirmed that the route would be introduced using route number SL4.

In 2023, the contract to operate the service was awarded to Blue Triangle, a subsidiary of Go-Ahead London.

Route SL4 was introduced on 7 April 2025, the same day as the opening of the Silvertown Tunnel.

== Current route ==
Route SL4 operates via these primary locations:

- Grove Park
- Lee station
- Lee Green
- Blackheath station
- Sun in the Sands
- Leamouth
- East India station
- Billingsgate Fish Market
- Canary Wharf station
- Westferry Circus

== Operation ==
The route operates at a frequency of a bus every eight minutes on weekdays and every 15 minutes on weekends.

Like all bus services using the Silvertown Tunnel, the service is operated using zero emission battery electric buses. Originally, the service was to be free to use for all passengers until at least April 2026. In February 2026, this was extended by a further seven weeks with free travel applying until the end of 26 May 2026.
