= Blackwall Tunnel =

Pair of road tunnels underneath the River Thames in London

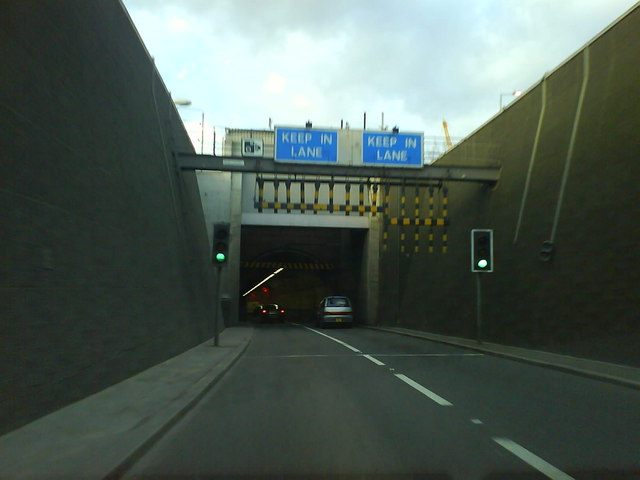
- Southern entrance to the Victorian bore
- Interactive map of Blackwall Tunnel

Overview
- Location: Blackwall / Greenwich
- Coordinates: 51°30′16″N 00°00′11″W
- Status: Open
- Route: A102 road
- Start: London Borough of Tower Hamlets
- End: Royal Borough of Greenwich

Operation
- Constructed: 1892–1897 (western bore); 1960–1967 (eastern bore)
- Opened: 22 May 1897 (western bore); 2 August 1967 (eastern bore)
- Owner: Transport for London
- Traffic: Automotive
- Character: Limited-access highway (since May 1969)

Technical
- Length: 1,350 m (4,430 ft) (western bore); 1,174 m (3,852 ft) (eastern bore)
- No. of lanes: 2 per bore (4 in total)
- Operating speed: up to 30 mph (48 km/h)

The Blackwall Tunnel is a pair of road tunnels underneath the River Thames in east London, England, linking the London Borough of Tower Hamlets with the Royal Borough of Greenwich, and part of the A102 road. The northern portal lies just south of the East India Dock Road (A13) in Blackwall (Note: Blackwall Tunnel, northern end, 51°30′32.87″N 000°00′24.85″W); the southern entrances are just south of The O2 on the Greenwich Peninsula. (Note: Blackwall Tunnel, southern end of south tunnel, 51°29′56.17″N 000°00′04.92″E and the southern end of the north tunnel, 51°30′01.84″N 000°00′06.7″E) The road is managed by Transport for London (TfL).

The tunnel was originally opened as a single bore in 1897 by the Prince of Wales as a major transport project to improve commerce and trade in London's East End. It carried a mix of foot, cycle, horse-drawn and vehicular traffic. By the 1930s, capacity was becoming inadequate. A second bore opened in 1967 to relieve congestion, handling southbound traffic while the earlier 19th century tunnel handled northbound traffic.

The northern approach takes traffic from the A12 and the southern approach takes traffic from the A2, making the tunnel crossing a key link for both local and longer-distance traffic between the north and south sides of the river. It forms part of a key route into Central London from South East London and Kent and was the easternmost all-day crossing for vehicles before the opening of the Dartford Tunnel in 1963.

Until the opening of the nearby Silvertown Tunnel in April 2025, it was the easternmost free fixed road crossing of the Thames, and regularly suffered congestion, to the extent that tidal flow schemes were in place from 1978 until their controversial removal in 2007. Given the very high traffic volumes at the crossing (and the height restrictions of the Victorian bore) the crossing was supplemented by the Silvertown Tunnel. When the Silvertown Tunnel opened on 7 April 2025, it and the Blackwall Tunnels were tolled.

The tunnels are no longer open to pedestrians, cyclists or other non-motorised traffic, and the northbound tunnel has a 4.0-metre (13.1 ft) height limit. The London Buses route 108 between Lewisham and Stratford runs through the tunnels.

== History ==
=== First tunnel ===
A framing section of the Blackwall Tunnel being constructed at the Thames Ironworks around 1895

A tunnel in the Blackwall area was originally proposed in the 1880s. A bridge was not feasible due to shipping in the River Thames in East London. According to Robert Webster, then MP for St Pancras East, a tunnel would "be very useful to the East End of London, a district representing in trade and commerce a population greater than the combined populations of Liverpool, Manchester and Birmingham." By this time, all road bridges in London east of the ferry at Chiswick were toll-free, but these were of little use to the two fifths of London's population that lived to the east of London Bridge.

Thames Tunnel (Blackwall) Act 1887
- Act of Parliament
- Parliament of the United Kingdom
- Long title: An Act for enabling the Metropolitan Board of Works to make a new means of communication across the River Thames by means of a Tunnel or Subway at Blackwall.
- Citation: 50 & 51 Vict. c. clxxii

Dates
- Royal assent: 8 August 1887

Text of statute as originally enacted

The Thames Tunnel (Blackwall) Act 1887 (50 & 51 Vict. c. clxxii) was enacted in August 1887. It provided the legal framework necessary to construct the tunnel. The initial proposal, made by Sir Joseph Bazalgette, called for three parallel tunnels, two for vehicular traffic and one for foot, with an expected completion date of works within seven years. It was originally commissioned by the Metropolitan Board of Works but, just before the contract was due to start, responsibility passed to the London County Council (LCC) when the former body was abolished in 1889 and Bazalgette's work on the tunnel ended.

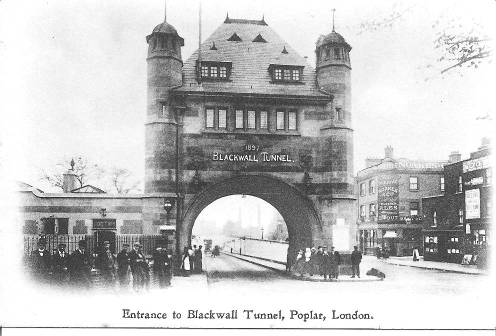
The northern entrance to the tunnel in 1899, when it was still a single bore

The original tunnel as built was designed by Sir Alexander Binnie and built by S. Pearson & Sons, between 1892 and 1897, for whom Ernest William Moir was the lead engineer. It has an external diameter of 27 feet | 8.23 metres and was constructed using a Greathead tunnelling shield and compressed air techniques (named after its inventor, James Henry Greathead). During the build they excavated a human skeleton with a stake through the middle and an elephant's tusk. It was lit by three rows of incandescent street lights. To clear the site in Greenwich, more than 600 people had to be rehoused, and a house reputedly once owned by Sir Walter Raleigh had to be demolished. The workforce was largely drawn from outside London; the tunnel lining was manufactured in Glasgow, while the manual labour came from provincial England, particularly Yorkshire.

The tunnel was formally opened by the Prince of Wales on 22 May 1897. The total cost of the tunnel was £1.4 million, and 800 men were employed in its construction, during which seven deaths were recorded.

Two entrance gateways were built north and south of the tunnel (only the southern entrance gateway, also known as Southern Tunnel House, remains). Designed by LCC architect Thomas Blashill in an Art Nouveau style, using light-brown sandstone with contrasting bands of red sandstone, they were built just before the tunnel was completed, and were rectangular in plan, with octagonal turrets on each corner. Intended to provide basic living accommodation for the superintendent and caretaker of the tunnel, each had two bedrooms, a living-room, scullery, larder and a toilet on the level over the archway. The roofspace included a third bedroom and a cistern room.

Today, the western bore is only used for northbound traffic and is not accessible to vehicles taller than 4 m (13 ft). Given this, an expansion of the crossing had been proposed for many years—such as a third bore of the tunnel, proposed in 1989—however none of these proposals were pursued. The tunnel has several sharp bends, in order that the tunnel could align with Northumberland Wharf to the north and Ordnance Wharf to the south, and avoid a sewer underneath Bedford Street. Some sources, such as PJ Thomas (circa 1899), state that an additional purpose was to prevent horses from bolting once they saw daylight. The tunnel carries two lanes of traffic, though higher vehicles need to keep to the left-hand lane so that they do not hit the tunnel's inner lining.

Following the cancellation of the Thames Gateway Bridge in 2008, a new crossing from the Greenwich Peninsula to Silvertown—the Silvertown Tunnel—was proposed by TfL. Following a public inquiry, the government approved the proposal in May 2018, and the contract to build the tunnel was awarded in November 2019. Construction began in March 2021.

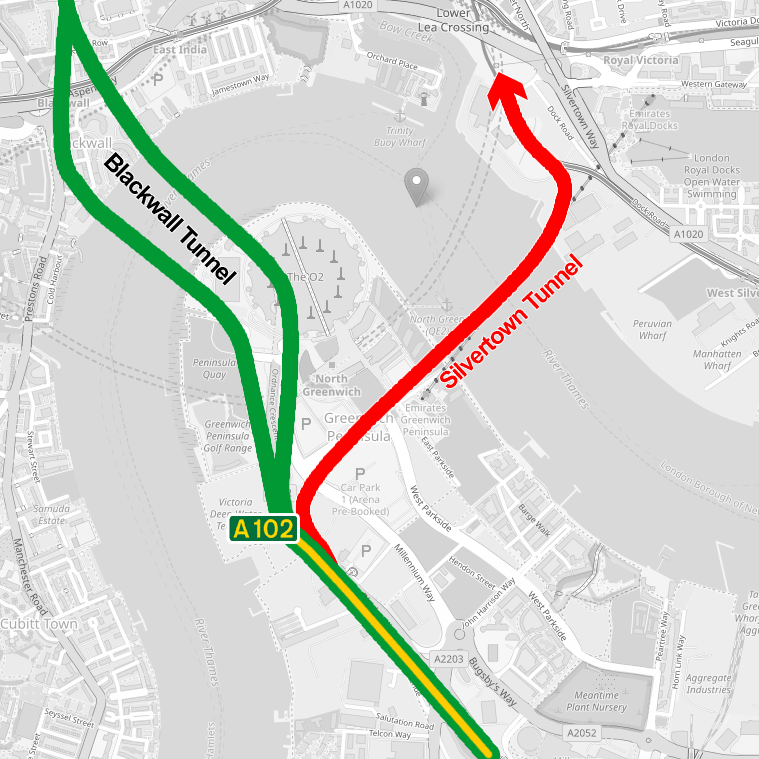
Map of the route of the Silvertown Tunnel

=== Second tunnel ===
London County Council (Tunnel and Improvements) Act 1938
- Act of Parliament
- Parliament of the United Kingdom
- Long title: An Act to empower the London County Council to make a new street street widenings and other works in connection with the southern approach to Wandsworth Bridge; and to construct a tunnel under the River Thames and street and other works in connection with Blackwall Tunnel; to empower the Council of the Metropolitan Borough and City of Westminster to make street improvements, and for other purposes.
- Citation: 1 & 2 Geo. 6. c. lxxxi

Dates
- Royal assent: 29 July 1938

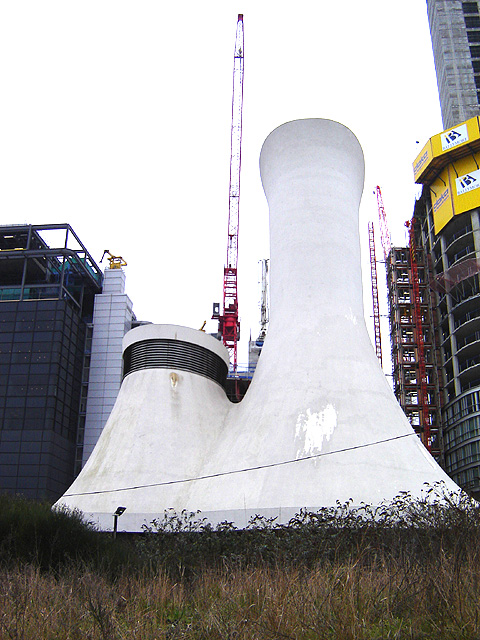
The northern ventilation towers for the second Blackwall tunnel, February 2006

Due to the increase in motor traffic in the early 20th century, the capacity of the original tunnel was soon perceived as inadequate. In 1930, John Mills, MP for Dartford, remarked that HGVs delivering from Essex to Kent could not practically use any crossing of the Thames downstream of the tunnel. The LCC obtained an act in 1938, the London County Council (Tunnel and Improvements) Act 1938 (1 & 2 Geo. 6. c. lxxxi), allowing them to construct a new tunnel, but work did not start due to the outbreak of World War II. Construction eventually started in 1958 with preliminary work on the northern approach road. By this time, traffic had become progressively worse. In 1960, Richard Marsh, MP for Greenwich complained that vehicles could spend 30 to 45 minutes stuck in tunnel traffic.

The new eastern tunnel, 8.59 metres (28 ft 2 in) in diameter, was accepted into the roads programme in March 1959, and construction started in March 1960. It was opened on 2 August 1967 by Desmond Plummer, Leader of the Greater London Council (GLC). It is wider than the western tunnel, carries two lanes of traffic and is usable by vehicles up to 4.72 m (15.5 ft) in height. During construction, transport minister Ernest Marples clarified that unlike the Dartford Tunnel, also then under construction, tolls would not be imposed as the tunnel was already an established route.

At the time of opening, the strip lighting in the tunnel was commended as "a big improvement" on the standard provided in the original tunnel. In contrast with the Victorian northbound tunnel, the eastern tunnel had no sharp bends, and emergency telephones were provided. Its distinctive ventilation towers were designed in 1964 by GLC architect Terry Farrell. Immediately after opening, the old tunnel was closed for refurbishment. It re-opened on 4 April 1969 with a new overheight vehicle detection system.

In the late 1960s, proposals were made to connect the tunnel with a free-flow, grade-separated motorway system as part of the London Ringways project. The only parts of this project completed were the A102(M) Blackwall Tunnel approach roads in 1973.

The northern entrance building was demolished in 1958 during work on the approaches for the second tunnel. The southern entrance building was Grade II listed in 1973, while the ventilation towers were listed in 2000. In April 1986, the tunnel became part of the UK trunk road network. It was detrunked and control handed to TfL in September 1999.

=== Provisional IRA bombing ===
On 18 January 1979, an anonymous caller to the Press Association informed them that the Provisional IRA had planted a bomb in the tunnel that was scheduled to detonate at midnight. While the Metropolitan Police were searching the tunnel, the bomb detonated at 12:40 a.m., causing an explosion in a gas holder near the southern exit. This resulted in a fire on another gas holder approximately an hour later. No injuries were reported. Speaking in the House of Commons, Home Secretary Merlyn Rees hoped "the House will join me in condemning these attacks and will support the Government in their determination not to be swayed by such methods". A Belfast man was jailed in May 1983 for his role in the bombing, and was eventually released at the end of his sentence some 17½ years later, still professing pride in his IRA participation.

== Toll charges ==
Charging for the Blackwall Tunnel began when the Silvertown Tunnel opened on 7 April 2025. Charges for the Blackwall tunnel are the same as for the Silvertown tunnel, and apply between 06:00 and 22:00. Use of the tunnel is free overnight. Peak times are Monday to Friday, 06:00 to 10:00 northbound and 16:00 to 19:00 southbound. Users must use TfL's Auto Pay system to benefit from off-peak tolls.

Charges
Vehicle type	Peak	Off-peak (with Auto Pay)
Cars and small vans	£4.20	£1.55
Motorcycles	£2.60	£1.55
Large vans	£6.80	£2.60
Heavy goods vehicles	£10.50	£5.25

Taxis, blue badge holders, wheelchair-accessible and 'zero-emission capable' private hire vehicles licensed by TfL are exempt. Discounts are available to low income drivers in 12 boroughs, and for small businesses in Tower Hamlets, Newham and Greenwich.

In June 2025, TfL confirmed it had implemented a one month grace period for drivers who did not pay the toll charges, and that it had begun issuing penalty charges.

After the toll charges were imposed, the nearby Woolwich Free Ferry reported a daily increase in traffic of around 1,800 vehicles as drivers sought to avoid the charges.

== Nearest alternative crossings ==
TfL states that one of the major issues with the Blackwall Tunnels is the lack of resilience in the event of an incident—as the nearest alternative road crossings are the Rotherhithe Tunnel 2 mi (3 km) to the west, Tower Bridge 3 mi (5 km) to the west, and the Dartford Crossing 16 mi (26 km) to the east. The Silvertown tunnel 0.9 mi (1.5km) to the west. The Woolwich Free Ferry is 2 mi (3 km) to the east, but is closed overnight, often reduced to one boat in operation, or completely closed at weekends. Variable message signs (VMS) near the tunnel inform drivers if the ferry is available. When open, queuing for the ferry causes significant congestion around Woolwich town centre.

Underground railway links include the Jubilee line from North Greenwich (TfL) to Canning Town on the east and Canary Wharf on the west. The Docklands Light Railway also passes under the Thames between Island Gardens at the southern end of the Isle of Dogs and Cutty Sark in the centre of Greenwich.

Horse-drawn traffic was partially banned from the tunnel during peak hours in July 1939 and completely banned in August 1947. Pedestrians have been banned from using the Blackwall Tunnels since May 1969.

The London Buses route 108 (Stratford–Lewisham) runs through the tunnels and there are bus priority gates at both entrances to allow buses to avoid traffic congestion. On occasion in the past, buses have been escorted through the tunnel when it has been closed to other traffic.

== Traffic management ==
The northbound Blackwall Tunnel is a traffic bottleneck with tailbacks. A TfL study in 2009 revealed that the 1.1-mile (1.7 km) approach to the northbound tunnel took around 19 minutes in rush hour traffic, or a delay of approximately 11 minutes per kilometre. To relieve the congestion, a tidal flow system was introduced in 1978, allowing northbound traffic to use the western lane of the eastern tunnel. The congestion is not limited to weekday rush hours. There is often congestion with tailbacks at the weekends, especially on Sunday evenings. Due to its sharp turns with restricted headroom, high-sided vehicles can only use the left-hand lane of the western tunnel, so it was not possible to reverse the tidal flow in the evening. In April 2007, the morning tidal flow was discontinued, after reports by TfL and the Metropolitan Police (MPS) of an increase in dangerous motoring behaviour; these blamed poor driving, such as overtaking, for the decrease in safety during counterflow operations. The decision to end the counterflow was controversial, particularly as TfL and the MPS had been considering it since 2005, without properly informing affected borough councils, and an independent committee was set up to evaluate the decision. The ending of the counterflow system has brought protests from users of the tunnel and those experiencing increased congestion due to the change.

In November 2007, the Mayor of London, Ken Livingstone responded to complaints from Greenwich Council about congestion in the area, with the possibility of setting up a small congestion charging zone. He clarified that this would not extend to the Blackwall Tunnel, stating "I have given that commitment right the way through my period as Mayor, and there cannot be anything that impacts on the A2 because the impact then on Lewisham is unacceptable." In 2012, TfL announced their intention to toll the tunnels to pay for the Silvertown Link crossing, suggesting it was the "most appropriate way". Responding to this, Paul Watters from the AA said "We’ve already seen the Western extension of the congestion charge dropped because it was hugely unpopular and I think tolling on the Blackwall Tunnel will be as controversial as that."

In June 2013, TfL announced they would send registration details of any broken-down or over-height commercial vehicle in the tunnel to the Vehicle and Operator Services Agency (VOSA), and set up a new automatic recognition system to detect unsuitable heavy goods vehicles heading towards it. TfL commissioner Sir Peter Hendy said that "this partnership working will help improve traffic flow on one of the busiest routes in the capital."

== Maintenance and closures ==
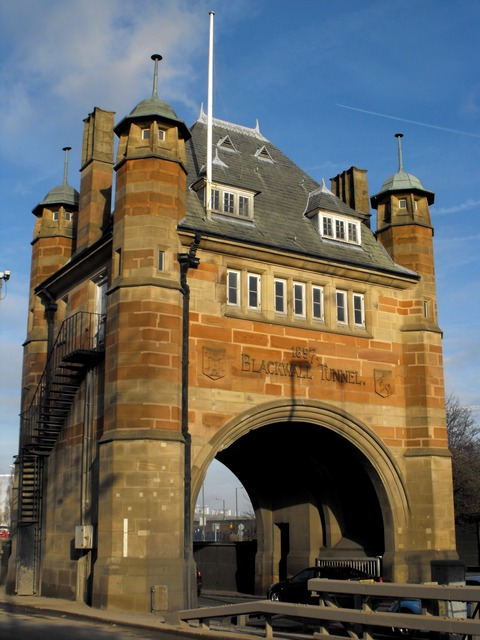
Southern Tunnel House, at the southern entrance to the tunnel. The gateway house is now Grade II listed.

The Blackwall Tunnel has attracted criticism in the past for its perceived lack of safety. In 2002, a survey by major motoring organisations rated the tunnel's safety record as "very poor", and concluded it was one of the least safe tunnels in Europe. In 2010, the northbound tunnel was refurbished in order to meet current safety standards. Fire detection systems have been installed in response to new European regulations in the light of recent tunnel fires.

In 2010, the southbound tunnel was affected by planned closures for maintenance from 10 pm to 5 am, Thursday to Sunday inclusive, and over a number of whole weekends. The tunnel was only closed six full weekends instead of the planned ten.

The tunnel also suffers regular problems with strikes from over-height traffic, and vehicles running out of fuel. On 10 December 1996, a man drove a Mercedes truck supporting a crane towards the southbound tunnel, ignored warnings that his vehicle was over-height, and struck a gantry, breaking a steel reinforcement frame in the process. The entire tunnel was immediately closed, not only to retrieve the vehicle, but to perform additional safety checks. Because the Limehouse Link tunnel, which runs near to the north end of the Blackwall Tunnel, and the Queen Elizabeth II Bridge, part of the Dartford Crossing, were also closed on the same day, the accident caused one of the worst traffic jams in the capital. In February 2011, TfL reported that the tunnel had been closed 1,200 times in the previous year for a total of 157 hours, while New Civil Engineer magazine reported it shut 1,448 times in 2010. To try to prevent closures of this nature, an LED noticeboard was set up in the northbound approach, counting the number of breakdowns and accidents per month occurring inside the tunnel.

During the 2010s the tunnel has been closed to motor traffic to provide cyclists access to the RideLondon event, although this arrangement is no longer in place.

== See also ==
- List of crossings of the River Thames
- Tunnels underneath the River Thames
