= Silvertown Tunnel cycle shuttle =

London bus route

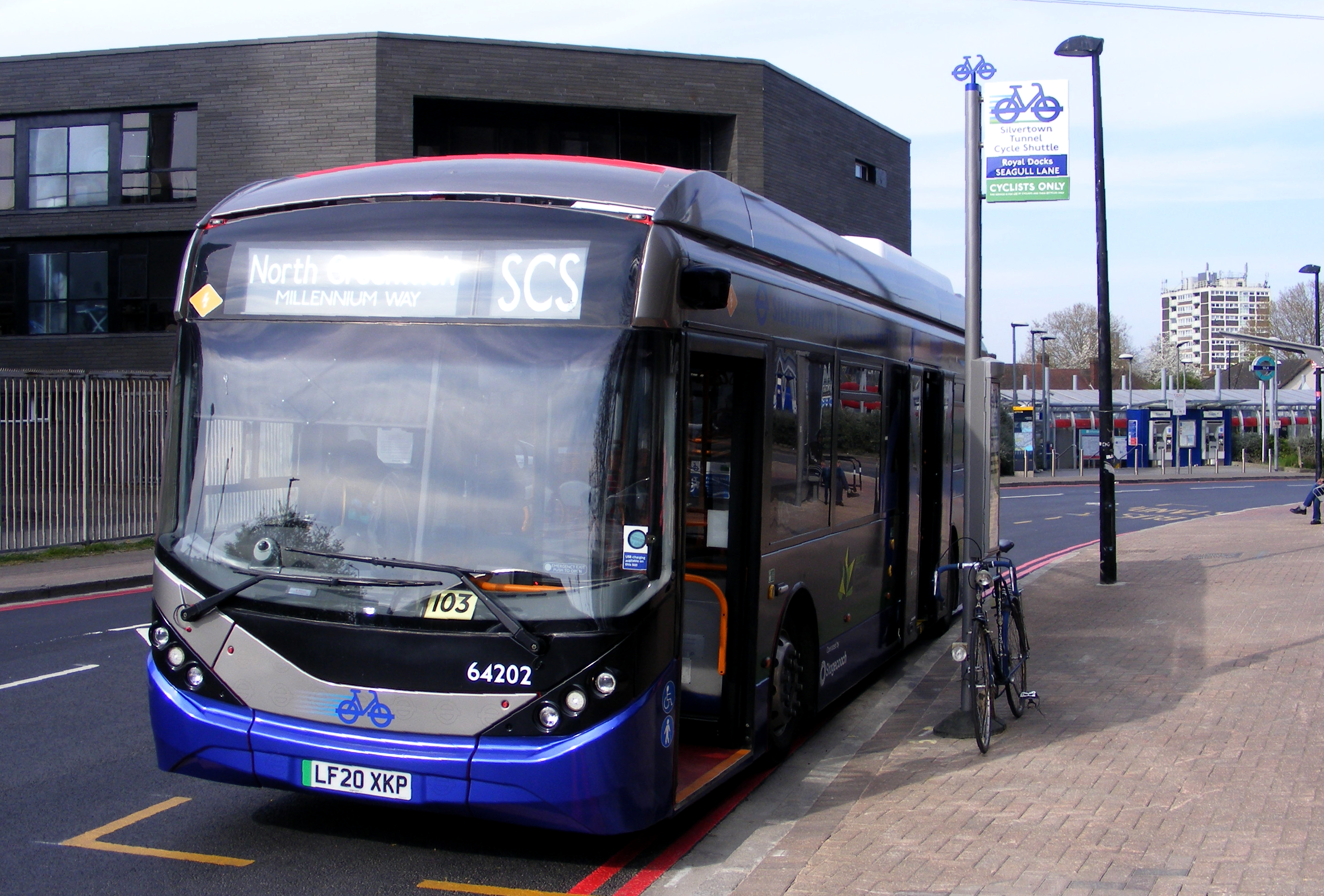
- East London BYD Alexander Dennis Enviro200EV at Royal Victoria station in April 2025

Overview
- Operator: East London (Stagecoach London)
- Garage: West Ham
- Vehicle: BYD Alexander Dennis Enviro200EV
- Peak vehicle requirement: 3
- Began service: 7 April 2025

Route
- Start: Greenwich Peninsula
- End: Royal Victoria station

Service
- Frequency: Every 12 minutes
- Journey time: 06:30–21:30

The Silvertown Tunnel cycle shuttle (SCS) is a Transport for London contracted bus route in London, England. Running between the Greenwich Peninsula and Royal Victoria station, it is operated by Stagecoach London subsidiary East London.

The route is one of three bus routes to run through the Silvertown Tunnel, alongside routes 129 and SL4. The route is only to be used by cyclists, with pedestrians not allowed on board.

== History ==
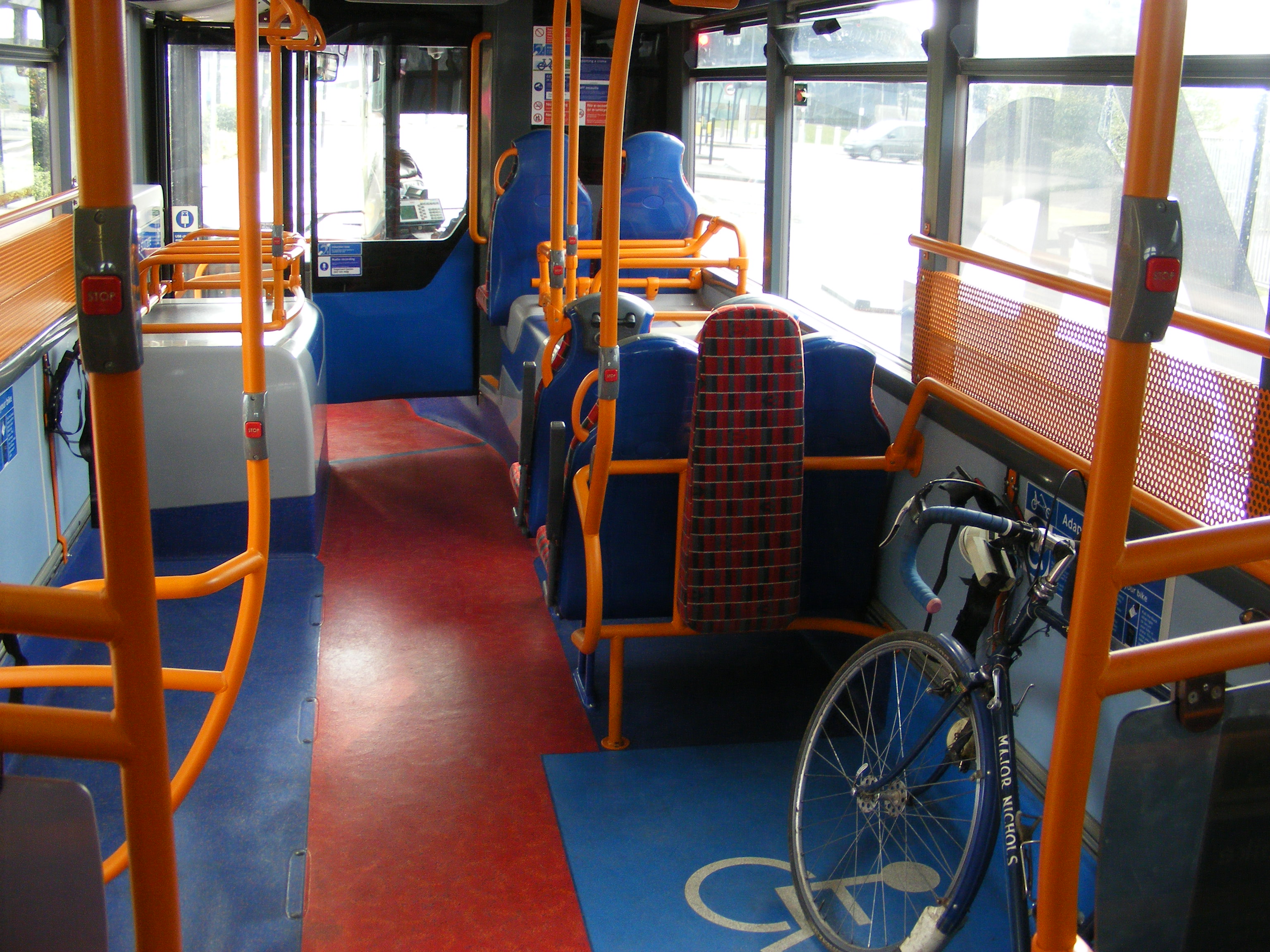
Interior of the shuttle bus

The Silvertown Tunnel cycle shuttle, first revealed by Transport for London (TfL) in October 2024, commenced operations on 7 April 2025, running between the Greenwich Peninsula and Royal Victoria station via the Silvertown Tunnel. It is operated by East London using BYD Alexander Dennis Enviro200EV buses drawn from route 323; the fleet of the latter was replaced by older diesel buses. Buses on the shuttle feature a silver and blue livery to distinguish it from other regular bus routes.

The route runs daily from 06:30 to 21:30 with a frequency of 12 minutes, and only serves cyclists, with pedestrians not allowed on board. Travel on the shuttle is free of charge "until further notice". The shuttle is the only TfL service where e-bikes are permitted; this is an exemption to a ban enacted in March 2025 following concerns over a potential fire risk. TfL has invested £2 million into this route.

== Current route ==
The Silvertown Tunnel cycle shuttle operates via these primary locations:

- Greenwich Peninsula Millennium Way
- Royal Victoria station Seagull Lane

== Reception ==
A TfL consultation conducted in July 2024 with 684 respondents found that 37% of cyclists would be likely to use a shuttle bus to cross the River Thames, and 83% of all respondents said that they would likely use the bus for leisure purposes as opposed to regular commute. The consultation also found that a ferry option was popular among respondents "with nearly 80 per cent saying that they would consider using a ferry service if it was provided in the future."
