= Belvedere Crossing =

Proposed River Thames crossing in East London

Overview
- Location: River Thames, Greater London
- Coordinates: 51°30′27.01″N 0°9′46.46″E
- Start: Belvedere
- End: Rainham

Operation
- Owner: Transport for London
- Character: Motor vehicles, rail, cycles, pedestrians

Route map
- Belvedere Crossing (London Borough of Bexley)

The Belvedere Crossing was a proposed River Thames crossing in Greater London, running between Rainham in the London Borough of Havering and Belvedere in the London Borough of Bexley.

Plans for the crossing, as well as the Gallions Reach Crossing further upstream, were dropped when Sadiq Khan became Mayor of London in 2016.

== Design ==
Each crossing was expected to consist of two lanes in each direction – one for public transport and one for general traffic. A charge was proposed for vehicles to use the crossings to manage demand and help pay for the scheme. Any pedestrian and cyclist facilities would be segregated from traffic.

It was considered that the crossing could be integrated into the railway network, most likely by continuing the London Overground Gospel Oak to Barking line extension to Barking Riverside across the river via the new crossing, and connecting to national rail lines at Abbey Wood.

== See also ==
- List of crossings of the River Thames
- Silvertown Tunnel
- Gallions Reach Crossing
- Thames Gateway Bridge
- Thamesmead Extension Scheme
