= Gallions Reach Crossing =

Proposed bridge or ferry crossing the River Thames

Overview
- Location: River Thames, East London
- Coordinates: 51.509283°N 0.087659°E
- Start: Beckton
- End: Thamesmead

Operation
- Owner: Transport for London
- Character: Motor vehicles, railway, cycles, pedestrians

Technical
- No. of lanes: 4

Route map
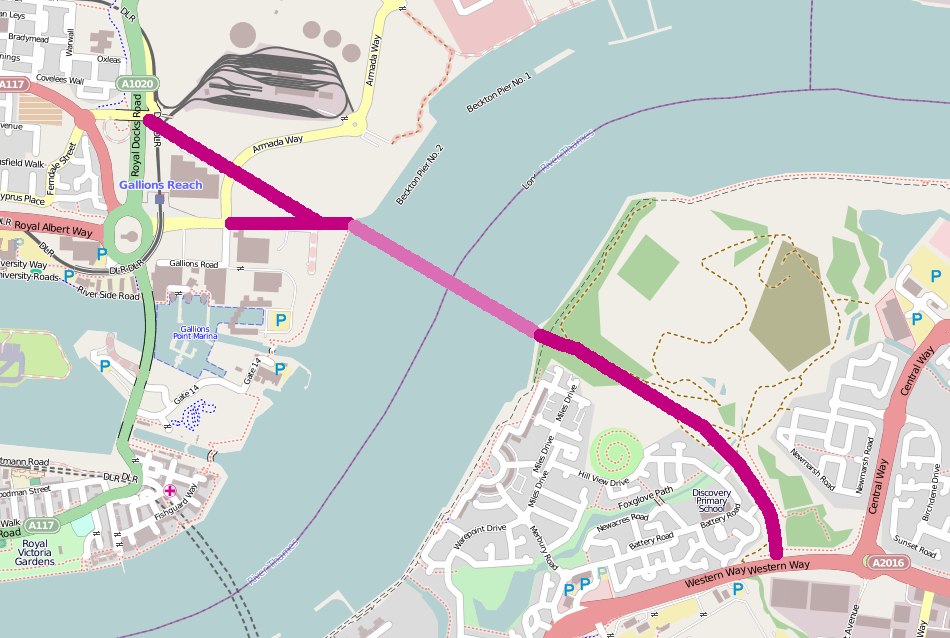
- Approximate proposed route of the crossing and connecting roads

The Gallions Reach Crossing was a proposed River Thames crossing close to Gallions Reach in East London, running between Beckton in the London Borough of Newham and Thamesmead in the Royal Borough of Greenwich. Originally a proposed ferry crossing replacing the Woolwich Ferry, later plans suggested either a bridge or a tunnel.

Plans for both the Gallions Reach Crossing and the Belvedere Crossing downriver were dropped after Sadiq Khan was elected mayor of London in 2016.

== History ==
The crossing was announced as a ferry route by the Mayor of London, Boris Johnson, in 2012 following the cancellation of the Thames Gateway Bridge, with a proposed operation date of 2017. Subsequent reports suggesting a bridge or a tunnel have put the opening date around 2025.

The ferry crossing would have replaced the Woolwich Ferry, with similar operational periods, given that the Woolwich ferry's infrastructure was reaching the end of its serviceable life. Capacity would have been doubled to 300 vehicles per hour in each direction. The promoters claimed that it would alleviate traffic congestion in the Woolwich area, which suffers from a mix of local and cross-ferry traffic.

== Alternatives ==
In addition to the proposed ferry, TfL suggested in 2013 a bridge or a tunnel as an alternative option. This would be a two lane crossing catering for local traffic, and would not be expected to open until after 2021. This would require an additional £30m of capital to service the Woolwich Ferry in the interim period.

In 2015, TfL announced that the bridge or tunnel plans were more likely to go ahead, and invited the public for their views. The crossing would be tolled, and contain two lanes of traffic each way, one dedicated to buses. TfL also suggested the Docklands Light Railway could be extended to Thamesmead or Abbey Wood as part of the works.

In 2023, as part of a consultation into the extension of the Docklands Light Railway to Thamesmead – TfL affirmed that they had no plans to deliver a road bridge in the area, and that they would "explore the removal of the [bridge] safeguarding" as it "conflicts with the vision for new homes, jobs and high-quality town centres". The DLR extension would instead provide a cross-river link in the area.

== Advocacy ==
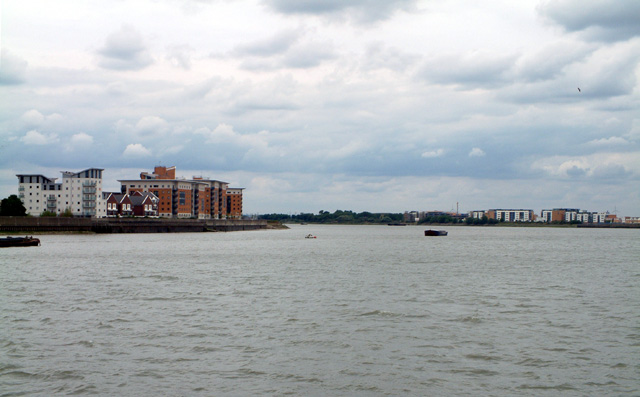
Approximate location of the crossing's proposed route in the Thames Estuary.

Both Jim Fitzpatrick, MP for Poplar and Limehouse, and Stephen Timms, MP for East Ham, have expressed support for a bridge in this location, rather than a ferry.

== See also ==
- List of crossings of the River Thames
- Silvertown Tunnel
