= Silvertown Tunnel =

Road tunnel beneath the Thames between Silvertown and North Greenwich

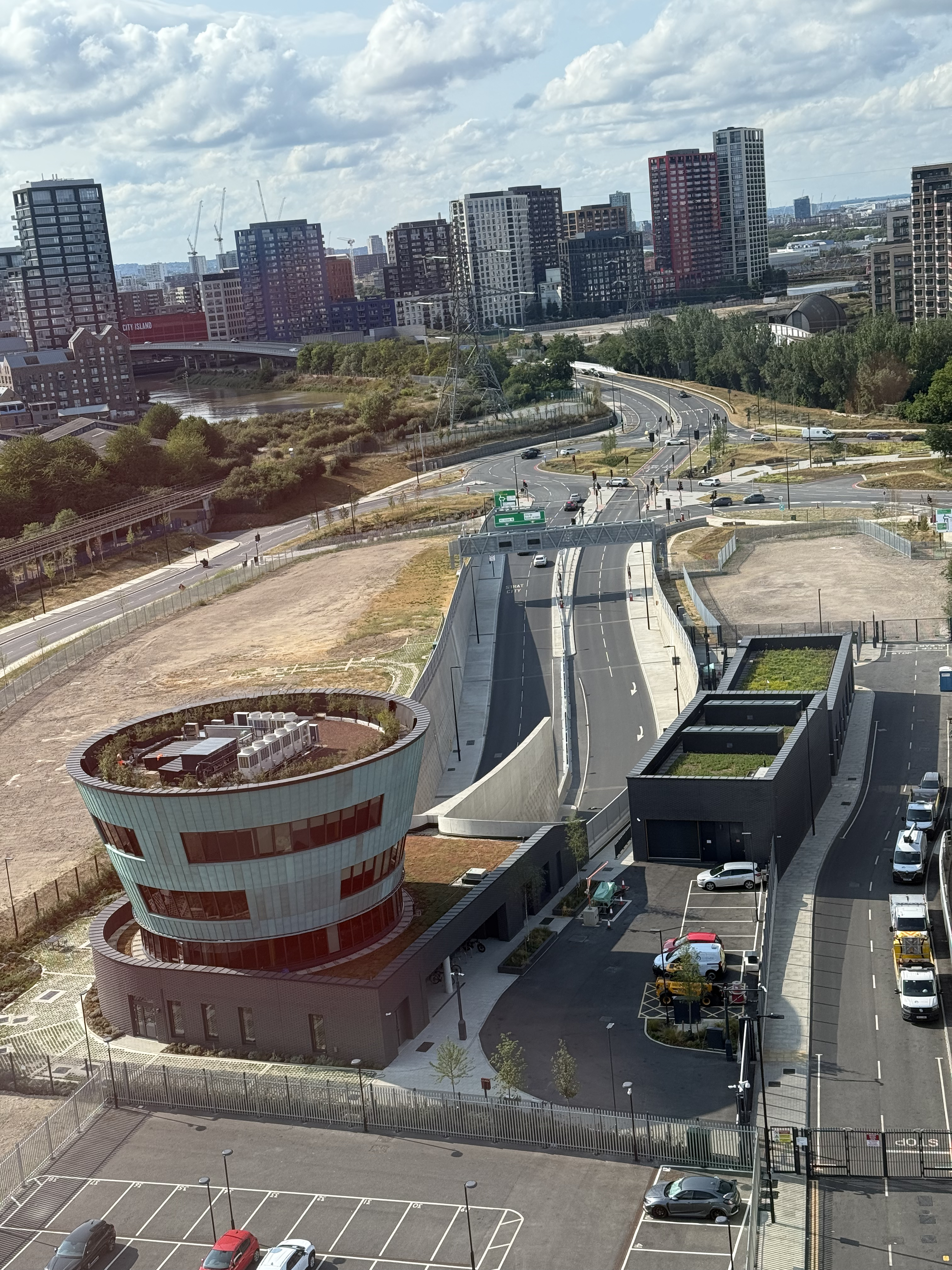
- Southbound entrance to the Silvertown Tunnel with the northern portal building

Overview
- Location: Silvertown / Greenwich Peninsula
- Coordinates: 51°30′17″N 00°00′29″E
- Status: Open
- Route: A1026
- Crosses: River Thames
- Start: London Borough of Newham
- End: Royal Borough of Greenwich

Operation
- Opened: 7 April 2025; 19 months ago
- Owner: Transport for London
- Operator: Riverlinx
- Traffic: Automotive
- Character: Twin-tube
- Toll: Cars and small vans: £4.00 peak, £1.50 off-peak Motorcycles: £2.50 peak, £1.50 off-peak Large vans: £6.50 peak, £2.50 off-peak Heavy goods vehicles: £10.00 peak, £5.00 off-peak

Technical
- Length: 1.4 km (0.87 miles)
- No. of lanes: 2 lanes per tunnel
- Width: 10.66 metres (35.0 ft) (internal)
- Cross passages: 8

The Silvertown Tunnel is a road tunnel, opened on 7 April 2025, beneath the River Thames in east London, England. The 1.4 km (0.87-mile) twin-bore tunnel runs between west Silvertown, east of the River Lea estuary, on the north side of the Thames and a portal adjacent to the existing Blackwall Tunnel on the Greenwich Peninsula south of the river. It is designated as the A1026 road.

Promoted by Transport for London, the tunnel was delivered through a design, build, finance and maintain contract by the Riverlinx consortium which was awarded in November 2019. The tunnel is intended to reduce congestion through the A102 Blackwall Tunnel. Both the Silvertown and Blackwall tunnels have been tolled since 7 April 2025. Charges apply between 06:00 and 22:00; it is free to use overnight.

The tunnel includes dedicated lanes for heavy goods vehicles, taxis, buses and coaches. Although there is no pedestrian or cycle access, a shuttle bus service for cyclists is now provided. All bus routes that use the tunnel are now zero emission.

== Route ==
A twin-bore tunnel connects the A1026 Silvertown Way/Lower Lea Crossing on the north side with the A102 road Blackwall Tunnel Approach on the south side, on an alignment similar to the London cable car. The left hand lane in the tunnel is restricted to only buses and goods vehicles over 7.5t, while the right hand lane is available for all traffic.

The Greenwich portal is located close to the Blackwall Tunnel portals, close to the O2 Arena and North Greenwich tube station. The Silvertown portal is located adjacent to City Hall and the proposed Thames Wharf DLR station. The tunnel is intended to reduce congestion through the nearby Blackwall Tunnel. The tunnel portals and control buildings were designed by dRMM.

== History ==
=== Background ===
Downstream east from Tower Bridge, there are four road crossings of the River Thames – the Rotherhithe Tunnel (opened in 1908), the northbound and southbound bores of the Blackwall Tunnel (opened in 1897 and 1967 respectively) and the Dartford Crossing (western tunnel opened in 1963, the eastern tunnel in 1980 and the bridge in 1991).

Both the Rotherhithe Tunnel and the northbound bore of the Blackwall Tunnel are subject to size and height restrictions, limiting the types of vehicles that can cross the river in this location. The Dartford Crossing is the next downstream crossing of the river and does not have these restrictions, however it is located around 16 mi (26 km) east of Blackwall – and is highly congested.

The Blackwall Tunnel is also highly congested, carrying around 3,000 vehicles per hour at peak times. Delays often occur at Blackwall due to the 4.0-metre (13.1 ft) height restriction for northbound journeys. As a consequence, cross-river bus journeys on route 108 have unreliable journey times, with the route often cited as amongst the least reliable in London.

Since 1999, major public transport improvements in east London have added cross-river connections, including the Jubilee Line Extension, extensions of the Docklands Light Railway to Lewisham and Woolwich Arsenal and the opening of the Crossrail Project as the Elizabeth line.

=== Additional river crossing proposals ===
Since the 1960s, there have been several proposals to add river crossings east of Tower Bridge that have not come to fruition. These included:

- East London River Crossing, a crossing connecting the North Circular Road at Gallions Reach to the A2 at Falconwood, proposed between the 1970s and 1990s
- Thames Gateway Bridge, a crossing connecting the North Circular Road at Gallions Reach to Thamesmead, proposed in the 1990s/2000s
- a third tunnel or bridge at Blackwall, proposed in the 1960s and 1980s/1990s
- the Belvedere Crossing, a bridge near Erith proposed in the 2010s

=== Silvertown Crossing ===
In the 1990s, the Government Office for London undertook feasibility work for an additional river crossing close to the Blackwall Tunnel, as part of development work for the Thames Gateway Bridge. Options considered included a third tunnel at Blackwall, a new crossing at Charlton and a new crossing at Silvertown. In 1995 and 1997, a route for a crossing from the Greenwich Peninsula to Silvertown was safeguarded, protecting it from conflicting development. This safeguarding was transferred to Transport for London (TfL) in 2001, following the formation of that body and the role of Mayor of London in 2000.

The first such mayor, Ken Livingstone, set out in his 2001 Mayor's Transport Strategy that the crossing at Silvertown was supported. This was part of a package of measures to improve transport in East London, including the Thames Gateway Bridge and new public transport crossings of the river. Livingstone expressed a preference that the link be a road tunnel, and that construction would follow the implementation of the Thames Gateway Bridge. The Thames Gateway Bridge was cancelled in November 2008 by Mayor of London Boris Johnson.

A public consultation on the Silvertown Tunnel and the Gallions Reach Ferry took place between February and March 2012. A further consultation was conducted from 29 October 2012 to 1 February 2013.

A consultation on levying tolls on both the Silvertown and the Blackwall tunnels opened in October 2014. Following a Nationally Significant Infrastructure Project inquiry, the government approved the proposal in May 2018.

=== Procurement and construction ===
In March 2017, TfL announced that three bidders had been shortlisted to design, build, operate and maintain the tunnel.

- Riverlinx – a consortium of Cintra, BAM, Macquarie Capital and SK E&C
- Silver Thames Connect – a consortium of Hochtief, Dragados and Iridium Concesiones de Infraestructuras
- Skanska and Strabag

In November 2019, the contract was awarded to the Riverlinx consortium.

Construction began in March 2021. The 11.87 m diameter earth pressure balance TBM used was supplied by Herrenknecht and named Jill after Jill Viner, the first female bus driver in London. Tunnel segments were supplied by Banagher Precast Concrete in Ireland. Tunnelling began in September 2022. In December 2022, TfL noted that construction of the tunnel was behind schedule, owing to inflation and shortages of materials and labour. The southbound tunnel drive was completed on 15 February 2023 to the Greenwich shaft, after which the TBM was turned around for the northbound tunnel drive. This was completed on 4 September 2023. A replacement pedestrian and cycle bridge at Boord Street was opened in July 2023. In February 2024, it was announced that the tunnel would open ahead of schedule in early 2025.

=== Opening ===
The Silvertown Tunnel opened to traffic in the early hours of 7 April 2025, tolling started at 6 am the same day. No formal opening ceremony was mentioned by TfL or in the media.

In June 2025, TfL confirmed it had implemented a grace period for around one month for drivers who failed to pay the toll charges from its opening, and that it had begun charging penalty charges.

==== Mass trespass ====
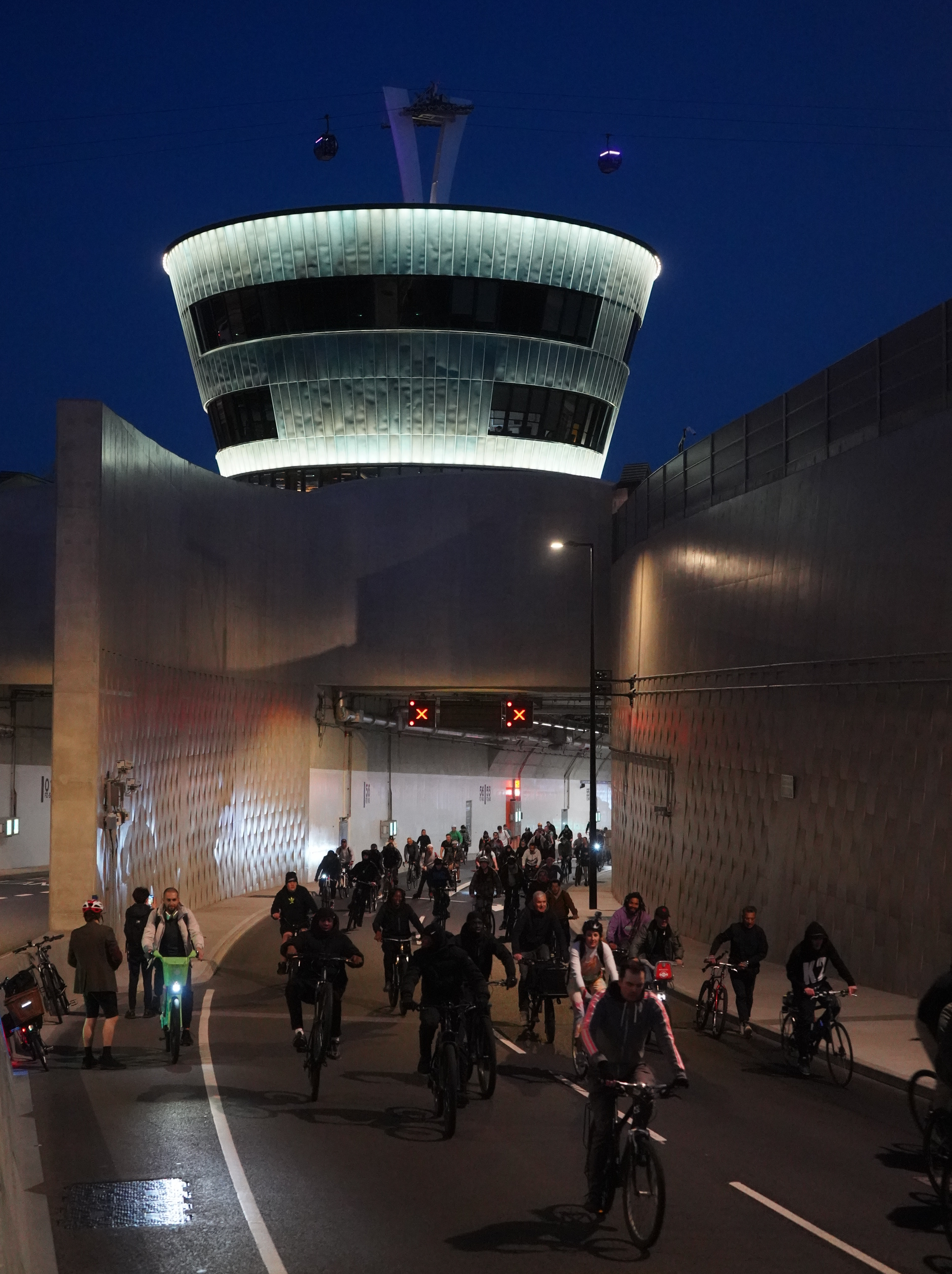
Mass trespass of Silvertown Tunnel by cyclists during a Critical Mass ride in April 2025

On 25 April 2025, approximately 1,000 cyclists staged a mass trespass in the Silvertown Tunnel as part of a Critical Mass ride, temporarily halting traffic. The trespass was in protest to the omission of cycling infrastructure from the newly opened tunnel. Although the ride lasted around ten minutes, TfL kept the tunnel closed for over an hour, citing safety and operational concerns.

== Toll charges ==
Toll charges began when the tunnel opened, and coincided with the introduction of tolling to the adjacent Blackwall Tunnel. Charges were similar to the Dartford Crossing. As of June 2023, charges for the Dartford Crossing are £2/£2.50 for cars, depending on method of payment. Signs submitted by TfL for approval, with prices suggested in 2015, appeared to show that vehicles using the tunnel between 06:00 and 22:00 will be charged £4 (cars), £3.50 (motorcycles) or £8.50 (other vehicles) for a single journey.

Discounts for residents in Greenwich, Newham and Tower Hamlets were considered in 2015, but were rejected. In October 2023 the Mayor of London proposed a discount for low-income residents.

Charges for use of the Silvertown tunnel are same as for the Blackwall tunnel, and apply from 06:00 to 22:00. Peak times are Monday to Friday, 06:00 to 10:00 northbound and 16:00 to 19:00 southbound. Users must register for TfL's Auto Pay system to benefit from off-peak tolls.

Charges
Vehicle type	Peak	Off-peak (with Auto Pay)
Cars and small vans	£4.20	£1.55
Motorcycles	£2.60	£1.55
Large vans	£6.80	£2.60
Heavy goods vehicles	£10.50	£5.25

Taxis, Blue Badge holders, wheelchair-accessible and 'zero-emission capable' private hire vehicles licensed by TfL are exempt. Discounts are available to low income drivers in 12 boroughs, and for small businesses in Tower Hamlets, Newham and Greenwich.

After the toll charges were imposed, the nearby Woolwich Free Ferry reported a daily increase in traffic of around 1,800 vehicles as drivers sought to avoid the charges.

== Public transport ==
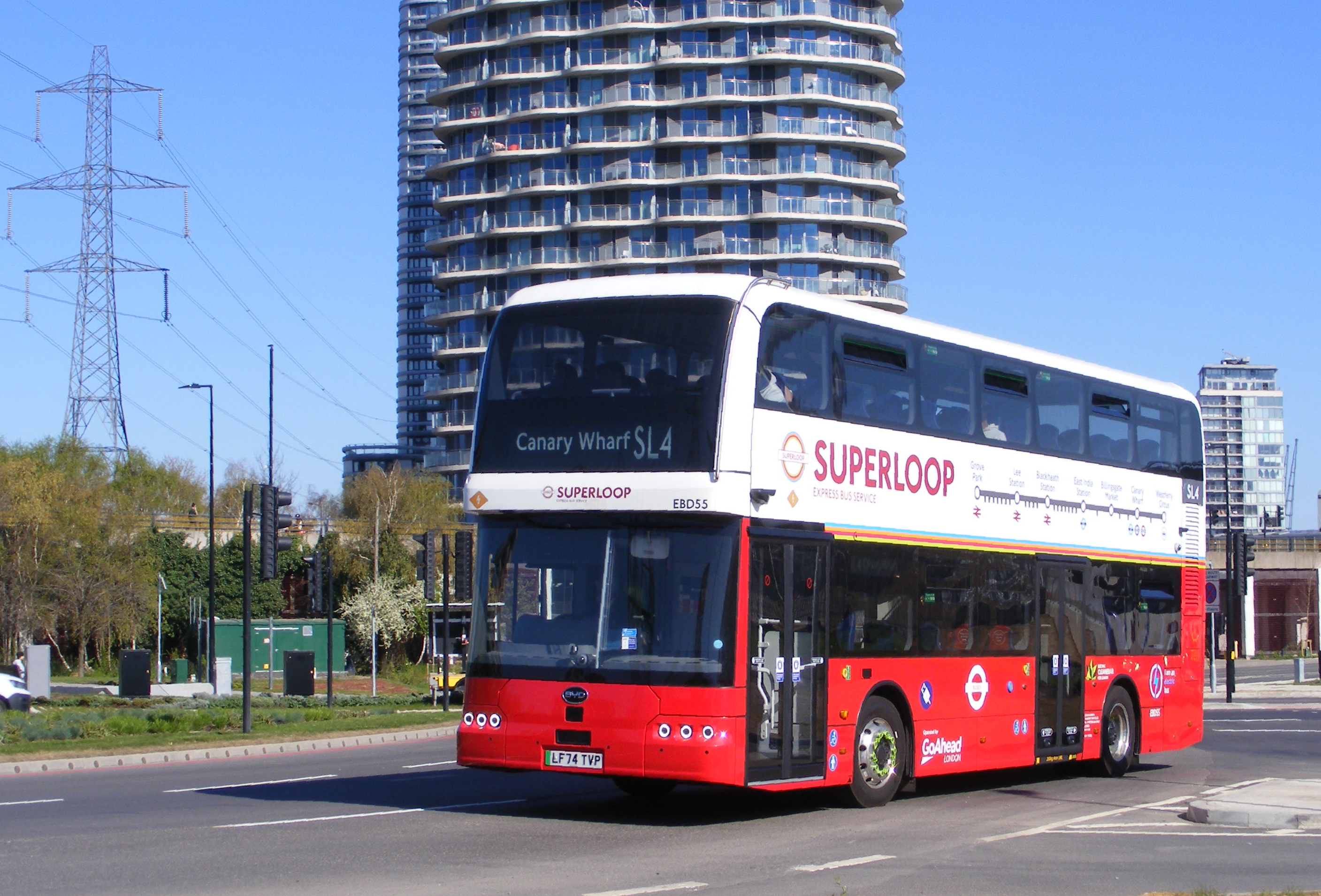
BYD BD11 bus leaving the Silvertown Tunnel, on London Buses route SL4

When Transport for London applied for permission to build the tunnel, it proposed that five bus routes would use it. However, in October 2022 plans were revealed with only two routes using the tunnel, with only one of them having stops either side of the river. Route X239 will run an express section between Blackheath (Sun in the Sands) and Blackwall (Leamouth) via the tunnel. The X239 was later subsumed into the Superloop scheme as route SL4. Traffic modelling in 2016 was based on around 37 buses per hour using the tunnels during peak times. However, this was later reduced to 20 buses per hour, the minimum required under the tunnel's planning consent.

In January 2025, TfL announced that the three cross-river bus routes through the tunnel, including the SL4, would be free for at least one year from opening; the fare-free period ended on 26 May 2026 after being extended. As of June 2026, the cycle shuttle bus is free to use 'until further notice'.

Bus routes that use the tunnel are zero emission.

== Cost ==
In 2012, the cost was stated to be £600 million. A consultation in 2015 stated that the cost of construction was estimated to be £1bn. In March 2020, the cost was increased again, to £1.2bn. In 2021, a Private finance initiative of £2.2bn was secured for construction of the tunnel. Riverlinx constructed the tunnel and will recoup their investment through tolls. Operation, maintenance and financial costs of the tunnel over 25 years is expected to cost Riverlinx £1bn. At the end of the 25 year contract, the tunnel will transfer to TfL at zero cost.

TfL spent around £200 million on the tunnel.

== Opposition ==
The tunnel has been criticised by opponents who fear it will increase traffic congestion, which would in turn increase air and noise pollution. Green Party member and councillor Caroline Russell expressed concern that as the cost of the tunnel would be covered by tolling, future mayors of London will want to keep traffic levels high in order to pay it off. The lack of walking or cycling facilities in the tunnel has been criticised. A planned pedestrian and cyclist bridge from Rotherhithe to Canary Wharf, the Rotherhithe crossing, was cancelled in 2019.

Plans submitted in 2019 suggested that 19 trees would be removed. However, revised plans submitted in 2021 suggested over 100 trees would be removed to construct the tunnel and access roads.

A report, 'The Silvertown Tunnel is in a hole, so STOP DIGGING', published in 2020, called for the £1.2 billion Silvertown Tunnel project to be cancelled. It claimed that the tunnel is incompatible with the Greater London Authority’s vision to be carbon neutral by 2030. The report was published by Transport Action Network, Stop the Silvertown Tunnel coalition, Speak Out Woolwich and Extinction Rebellion Greenwich.

=== Political opposition ===
Conservative Party

- Andrew Boff, former Conservative Group leader and Chairman of the London Assembly.
- Zac Goldsmith, former Conservative MP for Richmond Park and North Kingston, candidate for Mayor of London and Member of the House of Lords.

Green Party

- Cllr Scott Ainslie, former Green MEP for London and councillor on Lambeth Council.
- Jonathan Bartley, former Co-leader of the Green Party.
- Cllr Siân Berry, Member of Parliament for Brighton Pavilion and former London Assembly member.
- Zack Polanski, Green Party member of the London Assembly.
- Cllr Caroline Russell, Green Party member on the London Assembly and Leader of the Opposition on Islington Council.

Labour Party

- Lyn Brown, Former Labour MP for West Ham.
- Cllr Damien Egan, Former Labour Mayor of Lewisham and Member of Parliament for Kingswood.
- Rokhsana Fiaz, Labour Mayor of Newham.
- Philip Glanville, former Labour Mayor of Hackney.
- Cllr Peter John, Labour leader of Southwark Council.
- John McDonnell, MP for Hayes and Harlington.
- Abena Oppong-Asare, MP for Erith and Thamesmead.
- Matthew Pennycook, Labour MP for Greenwich and Woolwich.

Liberal Democrats

- Siobhan Benita, former Liberal Democrat candidate for Mayor of London
- Sir Edward Davey, Leader of the Liberal Democrats and former Secretary of State for Energy and Climate Change.
- Cllr Luisa Porritt, Liberal Democrat candidate for Mayor of London and Councillor in Camden.
- Caroline Pigeon, former Liberal Democrat leader on the London Assembly.
- Munira Wilson, Liberal Democrat MP for Twickenham.

=== Campaign groups ===
The tunnel is opposed by the 'No to the Silvertown Tunnel' campaign, and more recently the Stop the Silvertown Tunnel Coalition which claims that it would generate more traffic and more congestion, and lead to more air pollution.

In 2016 Friends of the Earth lobbied Tower Hamlets Borough Council to reject the proposal.

In July 2020, Extinction Rebellion protesters locked themselves to a drilling rig, calling on Mayor of London Sadiq Khan to halt the project amidst environmental concerns. In April 2021, 52 academics and campaigners sent a joint open letter to transport secretary Grant Shapps and Mayor of London Sadiq Khan seeking an "emergency review" of the proposed tunnel's environmental impact.

== See also ==
- Lower Thames Crossing, a proposed crossing to the east of the M25
- List of crossings of the River Thames
- List of road projects in the UK
