= Woolwich foot tunnel =

Tunnel under the River Thames in East London

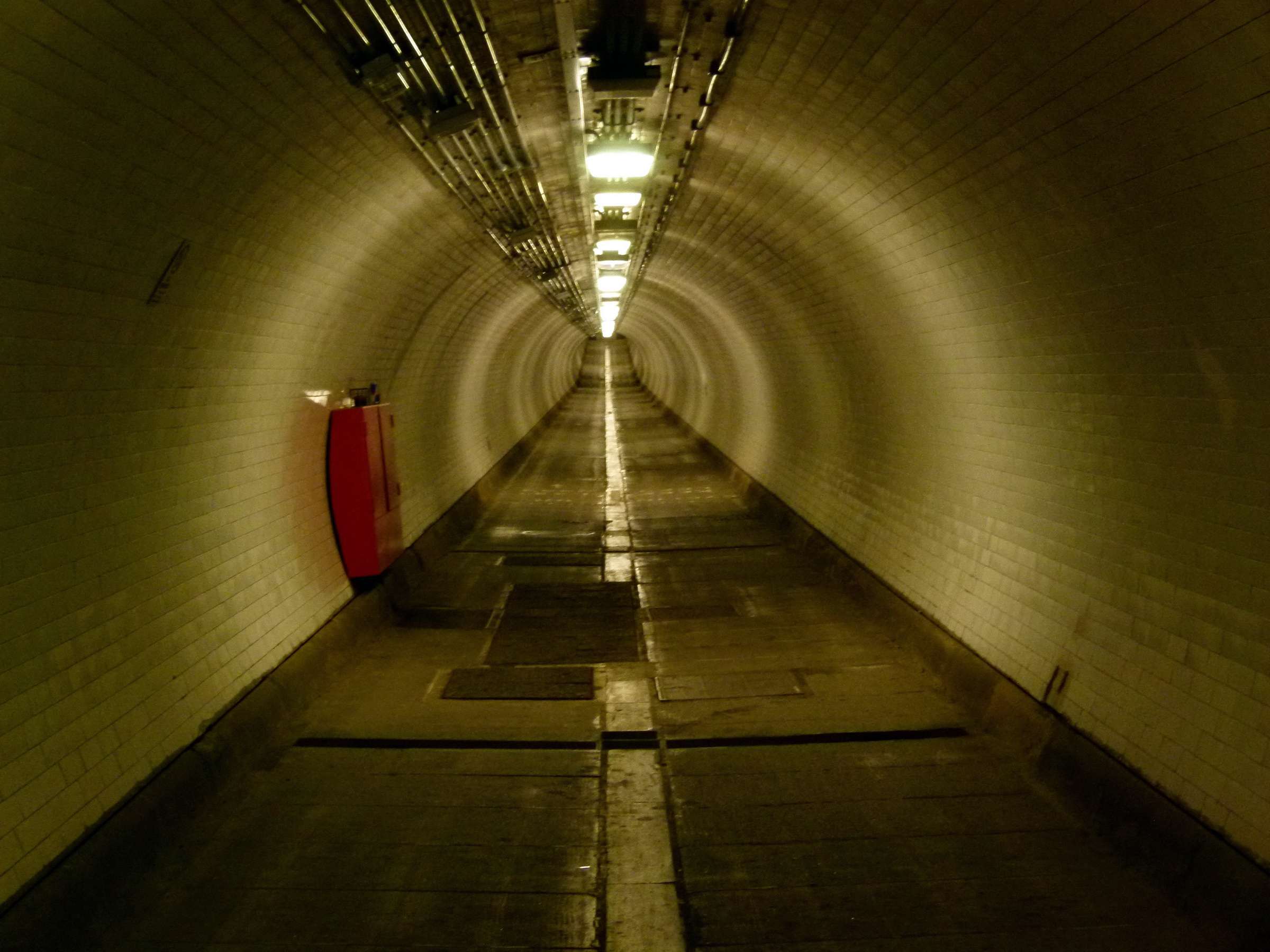

Overview
- Location: Woolwich, London
- Coordinates: 51°29′56″N 0°03′42″E
- Crosses: River Thames

Operation
- Opened: 1912
- Traffic: Pedestrian

Technical
- Design engineer: Sir Maurice Fitzmaurice
- Length: 504 metres (1,654 ft)

Route map

The Woolwich foot tunnel crosses under the River Thames in Woolwich, in East London from Old Woolwich in the Royal Borough of Greenwich to North Woolwich in the London Borough of Newham.

== Construction ==
The tunnel was designed by Sir Maurice Fitzmaurice and built by Walter Scott & Middleton for London County Council and opened by Lord Cheylesmore, Chairman of the LCC, on Saturday, 26 October 1912.

== Refurbishment ==
On 24 September 2010, Greenwich Council closed the Woolwich foot tunnel to all users, due to structural weaknesses discovered in the stairways and tunnel itself. The tunnel was originally expected to reopen in August 2011, but eventually reopened to the public in December 2011, though initially access to the tunnel was only by stairs until final works on the lifts were completed.

The tunnel has been fitted with a leaky feeder system to permit operation of mobile phones. The tunnel is 504 metres (1,654 ft) long and at its deepest, the tunnel roof is about 3 metres (9.8 ft) below the river bed.

The ‘Friends of Greenwich and Woolwich Foot Tunnels’ (FOGWOFT) was established in September 2013.

Council bylaws prohibit cycling inside the tunnel. The shared spaces trial was supported by Greenwich council but Tower Hamlets refused permission to update the bylaws and the sign system was discontinued; while some cyclists do ride in the tunnel, cycling is still not permitted. With a continuing impasse in updating the bylaws, FOGWOFT disbanded in March 2021.

== Usage ==
A 2016 survey showed that around 1,000 people use the tunnel each day.

The tunnel (open 24/7) offers pedestrians and cyclists an alternative way to cross the river when the Woolwich Free Ferry service is not operating. Both entrances to the tunnel (north entrance at 51°29′56″N 0°03′42″E and south entrance at 51°29′40″N 0°03′46″E) are Grade II listed buildings. The south entrance is somewhat hidden behind the Waterfront leisure centre. It is the oldest remaining building in the riverside area of Old Woolwich.

== Gallery ==
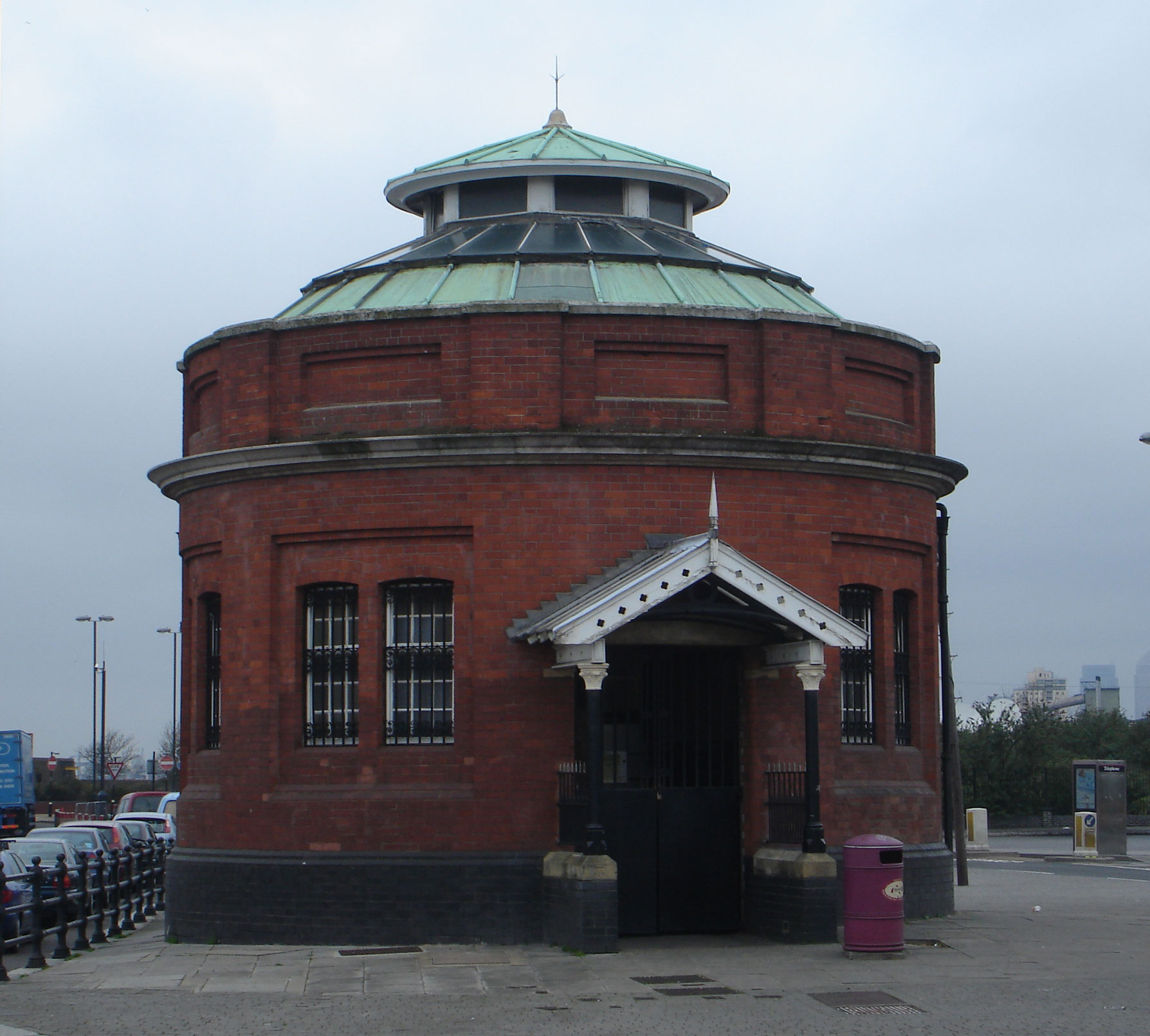
North entrance

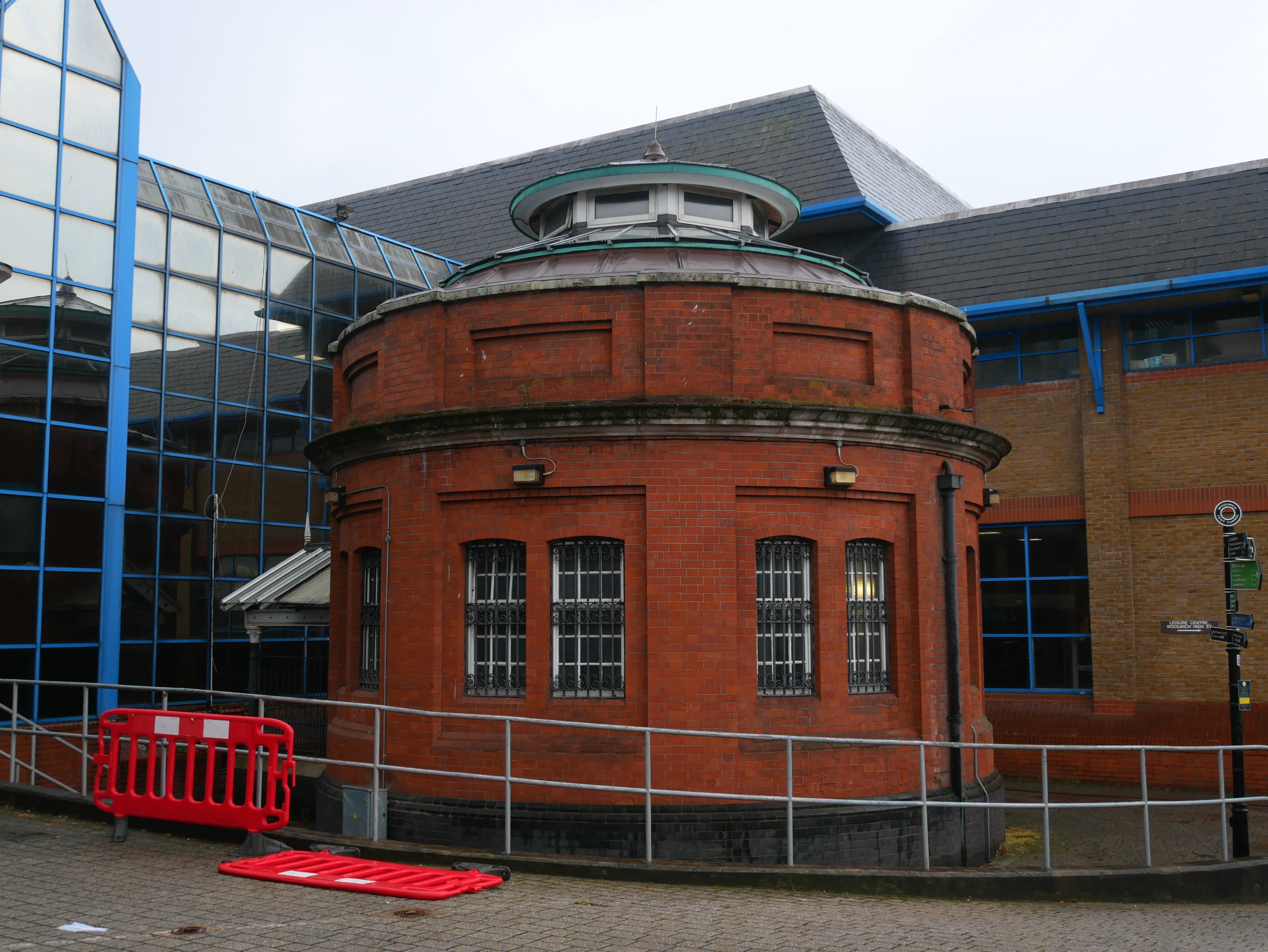
South entrance behind Waterfront Leisure Centre

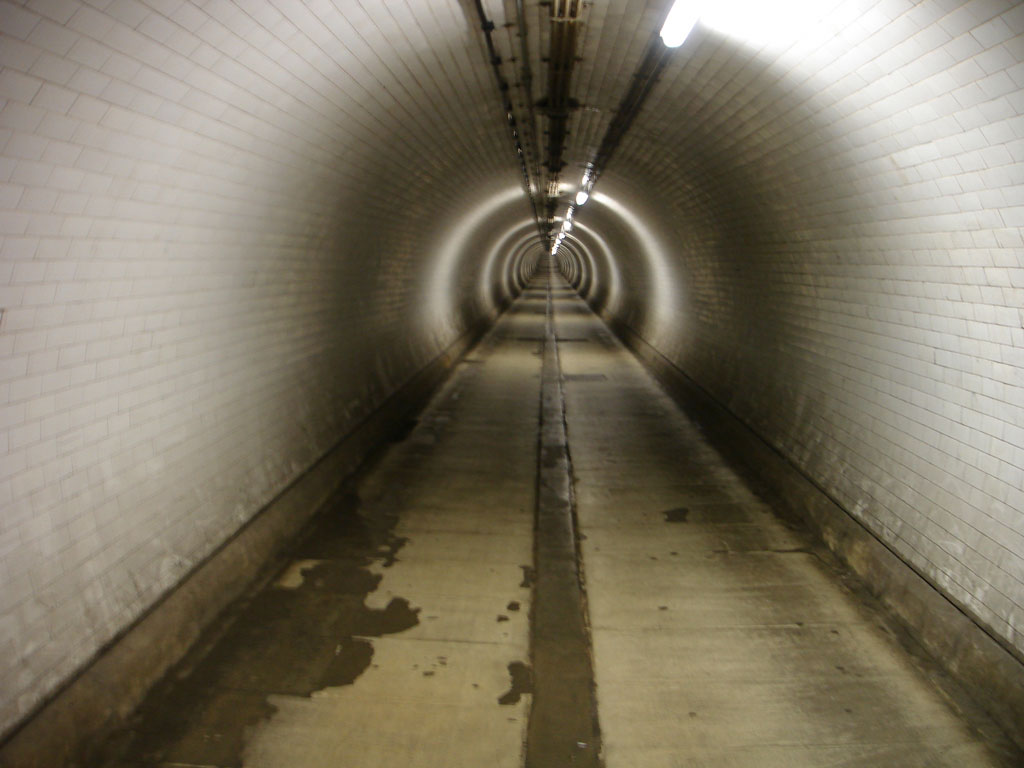
Inside Woolwich Foot Tunnel prior to 2011 refit

== See also ==
- Crossings of the River Thames
- Tunnels underneath the River Thames
