= Safeguarding (planning law) =

Provisions that protects future infrastructure projects

In British planning law, the term safeguarding refers to provisions that protects future infrastructure projects such as roads, railways, utilities and other infrastructure projects from conflicting development. Safeguarding of a project does not prohibit development, but ensures that any development allows for the future infrastructure project to be built and protects the land that would make building a future project more difficult.

Safeguarding of a particular project does not guarantee that the infrastructure will be built in future, and does not allow for compulsory purchase of land or the power to start construction. Those permissions have to be obtained through other legal processes, such as a Transport and Works Act Order or a hybrid bill. Formal Safeguarding Directions to confirm the safeguard of a project are issued by the relevant secretary of state.

Examples of projects that have been safeguarded include Crossrail 2, the Bakerloo line extension and High Speed 2.

== Passive provision ==
Safeguarding can also refer to efforts to allow future infrastructure to be built more easily, such as a straight piece of railway line at the location of a planned future station, or space for a future service area on a motorway. This is sometimes referred to as 'passive provision'.
