= W. & C. French =

Defunct English civil engineering company

W. & C. French Limited
- Company type: Public company
- Industry: Civil engineering
- Founded: 1870
- Defunct: 6 November 1973
- Successor: Kier Group
- Headquarters: 50 Epping New Road, Buckhurst Hill, Essex, IG9 5TH
- Area served: UK, Uganda, Kenya, South Africa, Malawi, Spain
- Services: Road construction

W. & C. French, also known just as French, was a civil engineering company based at Buckhurst Hill on the outskirts of Greater London, in south-west Essex.

== History ==
The business of Messrs W. and C. French was established by William French and his brother Charles French in 1870.

In the Second World War it constructed many RAF airfields and also built Mulberry harbour units.

On 19 September 1949 it became a public company, when the chairman of the company was Charles Samuel French, the son of William French. Another director was Brigadier John Linnaeus French CB CBE (18 November 1896 – 12 March 1953), a former commander of Colchester Garrison, and brother of Charles. Its transport depot was at Loughton. They had other depots at Colchester and Wisbech and carried out most of its work in East Anglia. The company was acquired by Kier Group in 1973.

=== Incidents ===
- On 1 June 1973 at 2am seven workers from the Smallfield site at Burstow near Gatwick, had an altercation with two plainclothes policemen, one being Detective Constable Francis Gibbs, at the Jet Line Club at Lowfield Heath. The police had asked the workers to move out of the way, so they could drive out of the car park. The trial occurred in September and October 1973.
- Two 27 year old construction workers died on the M23-M25 construction site at Merstham in 1973 when their site building caught fire. The workers were Charles Gallagher and Brian Coll, both from Inverkeithing in Scotland.
- A 19-year worker at Pease Pottage on the M23 motorway contract, on 19 March 1974, had his hand burned on an overhead 11kV transmission line, and had to have the hand amputated.
- In July 1975, on the M25 Reigate to Godstone section, three workers drowned, in a drainage inspection shaft, that was 25 feet deep, at Merstham. The workers were James Daly, 27 year old site engineer Michael John Horwood, and 31 year old excavator driver Patrick Carrigg. At the High Court in May 1978, 27 year old Jennifer Horwood and her two daughters, of Forest Hill, received £72,500. 31 year old Agnes Carrigg received £25,941, her son received £3,000, and her two daughters received £4,000 and £5,000.

== Major projects ==
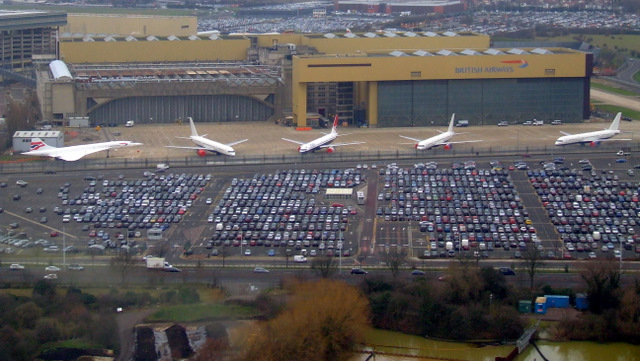
British Airways Heathrow building

- The Coronation Channel at Spalding, Lincolnshire on the River Welland completed in 1953
- Improvements at Acton Lane Power Station, completed in September 1966
- Beckton Sewage Treatment Works, developed in a joint project with Balfour Beatty, late 1960s
- Crossness Sewage Treatment Works, around 1963

=== Education ===
- New facilities at New Hall, Cambridge completed in 1965
- South Woodford halls residence for Queen Mary College, completed in 1964

=== Hospitals ===
- The second stage of Princess Alexandra Hospital, Harlow, completed in 1962

=== Housing developments ===
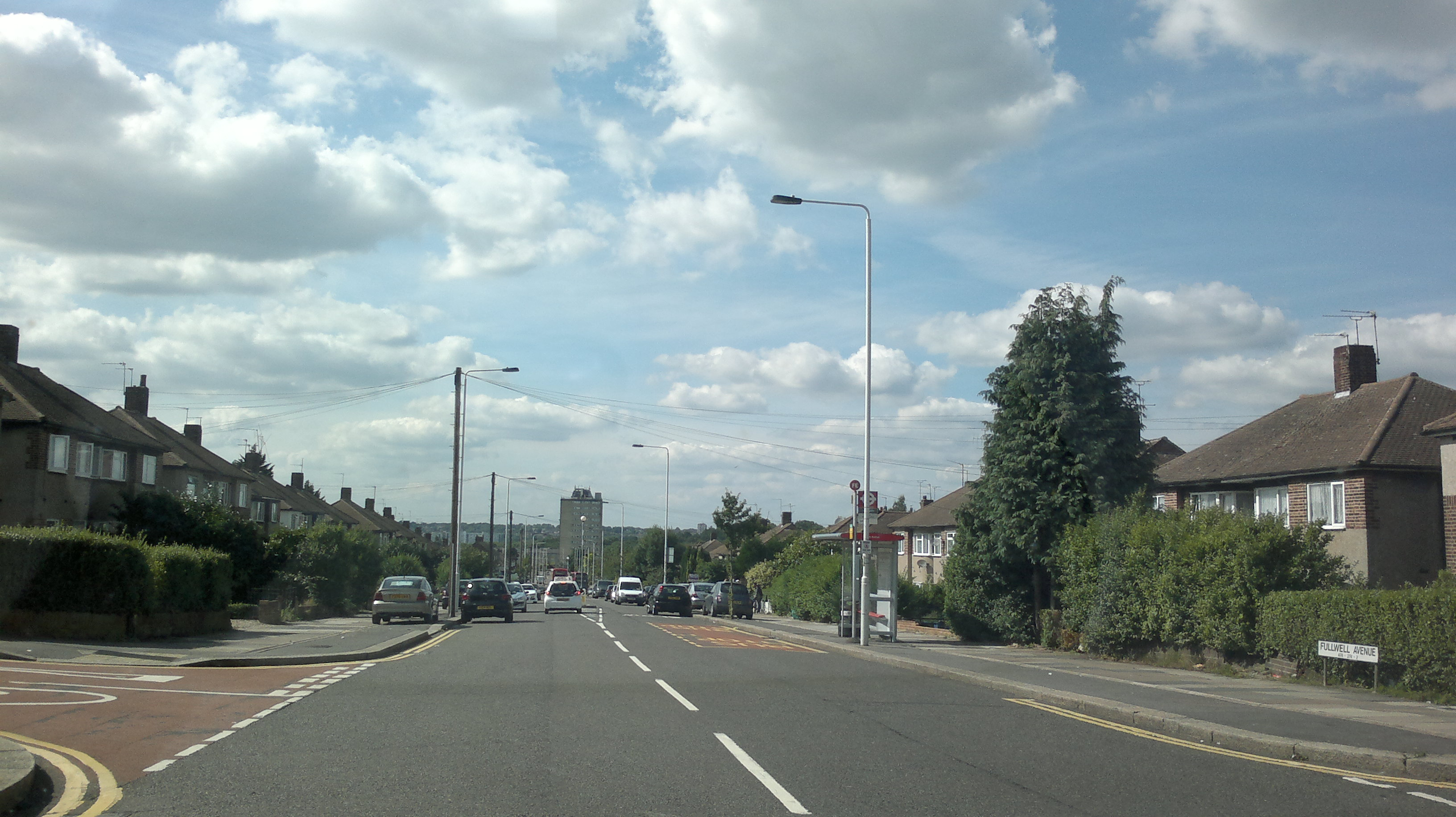
Owen Waters House

- Development of 1,340 houses in Houghton Regis in Bedfordshire, completed in May 1958
- High-rise flats at Stoke Newington, the Milton Gardens Estate, completed in c. 1964
- Owen Waters House, 12-storey high-rise block, Ilford, completed in 1964

=== Commercial buildings ===
- BP House at Great Parndon, completed in mid-1967
- Comet House, the corporate headquarters of BOAC, completed in c. 1964
- The computer building for BOAC, completed in c. 1966
- Daily Mirror Building near Holborn Circus (now the headquarters of Sainsbury's), completed in 1959
- the Debenhams store in Romford (formerly Stone's), completed in c. 1964
- Two large motels for Saxon Inn Motor Hotels, of Harlow, at Northampton and Blackburn (now owned by Mercure)
- Nationwide Building Society HQ, Princes Street, Swindon, completed in 1976

=== Railways ===
- The first two miles of the Piccadilly Line Heathrow extension, from Hounslow West tube station to Hatton Cross tube station, completed 1975
- Harlow Town railway station, completed in 1963
- Rebuilding of the Metropolitan line between Harrow and Moor Park tube station in 1963 for four lines
- Tower Hill tube station, completed in c. 1967

=== Reservoirs ===
- Covenham Reservoir completed in 1978
- Foremark Reservoir, south Derbyshire, completed in c. 1973
- Grafham Water (originally known as Diddington Reservoir) completed in 1965,
- Hanningfield Reservoir completed in 1957
- Hilfield Park Reservoir completed in c. 1966
- Queen Elizabeth II Reservoir (Walton South Reservoir) completed in 1962
- Queen Mother Reservoir, near Datchet, completed in 1976
- Upper Tamar Lake, north Cornwall, completed in 1977
- Wraysbury Reservoir completed in 1971

=== Roads ===
- Bracknell central gyratory, completed in c. 1974
- Gatwick Airport Link Road, completed in c. 1975
- A11 Harlow and Potter Street bypass, completed in c. 196021
- A118 Bow Interchange with the A12, and demolition of the former Bow Bridge, London, completed 1967
- A12 Brentwood bypass completed in 1965
- A12 Ufford to Wickham Market completed in 1976
- A14 Stowmarket to Claydon bypass, first stage opened in August 1975, and second stage opened in November 1975 (as the A45)
- A19 Sunderland Bypass and Hylton Viaduct completed in c. 1971
- A47 King's Lynn southern bypass, completed in 1975

=== Motorways ===
- A1(M) Durham Motorway, Bowburn (A177) to Carrville (A690), completed in May 1969
- M11 Redbridge to Loughton completed in 1975
- M18 Thurcroft (M1) to Wadworth (A1 M) completed in 1967
- M18 Thorne to East Cowick, with the Langham Interchange, completed in 1975
- M23 Hooley to Merstham completed in 1975
- M23 Merstham to Pease Pottage completed in c. 1975
- M3 Basingstoke East to Hawley, Hampshire completed in c. 1968
- M4 Wootton Bassett to Liddington completed in 1971
- M5 Oldbury to Ray Hall, completed in 1972
- M5 Edithmead to Dunball, completed in c. 1971
- M6 Carnforth to Farleton completed in 1970
- M6 Farleton to Killington completed in 1970
- M62 Pole Moor to Outlane completed in 1970
- M62 Outlane to Hartshead completed in 1972
- M62 Pollington to Rawcliffe completed in 1975
- M621 Gildersome to Beeston, completed in 1973
- Runnymede Bridge (now the M25), completed in 1961

=== Airfields ===
- BOAC maintenance depot (now British Airways) at Heathrow Airport completed in 1955
- BOAC engine overhaul plant at Nantgarw in south Wales, now GE Aviation Wales
- Flight catering centre for Marriott In-flite Services, on Faggs Road in Feltham, 1969,
- Extensions to East Midlands Airport buildings, completed in c. 1967
- Edinburgh Airport runway extension completed in c. 1973
- Gatwick Airport extended by 1,090 ft, completed in May 1973
- London Heliport completed in 1959
- RAF Alconbury completed in 1940
- RAF Downham Market completed in 1942
- RAF Duxford completed in 1943
- RAF Earls Colne completed in 1942
- RAF Graveley completed in 1942
- RAF Kings Cliffe completed in 1943
- RAF Rivenhall completed in 1943
- RAF Thurleigh completed in 1941

== Sources ==
- Hartcup, Guy (2011). Code Name Mulberry: The Planning Building and Operation of the Normandy Harbours. Pen & Sword Military. ISBN 978-1848845589.
