= Bow Road =

Road in Bow, London

Coordinates: 51.5278°N 0.0219°W

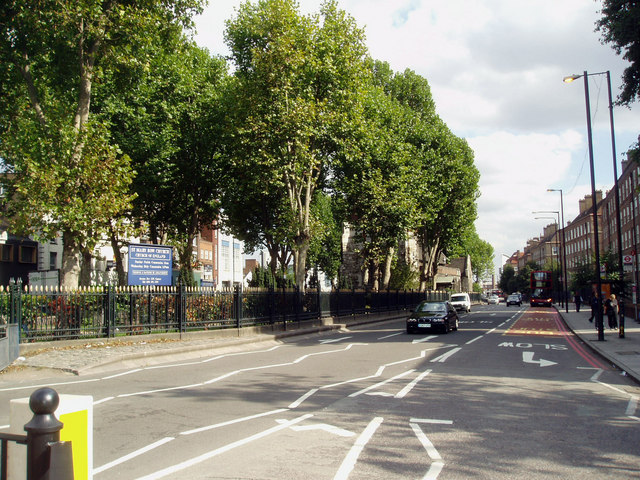
Bow Road, looking west opposite Bow Church

Bow Road is a thoroughfare in Bow, London, England. The road forms part of the A11, running from Aldgate to Norwich in Norfolk. To the west the road becomes Mile End Road, and to the east is Bow Interchange on the A12.

The College of Technology London was located on the road, as is Bow Church, and the Lea Valley Walk passes it near to Three Mills. The Electric House carries a memorial clock to Minnie Lansbury, whose father-in-law, George Lansbury, also lived on Bow Road.

Bow Road Underground station and Bow Church DLR station are located on the road, and two further stations, both now closed, were also once situated in Bow Road: Bow railway station and Bow Road railway station.

Bow Road is home to a number of pubs, including the Bow Bells, which is known for having the most haunted toilets in East London.

Since 2011, Cycle Superhighway 2 has run from Stratford to Aldgate along Bow Road.

London Buses route 8 and 25 make use of Bow Road as do routes 425 and 205

Bow Road, London is home to the Thames Magistrates Court near Bow Road Underground station, as well as a number of new commercial occupiers contributing to the regeneration of East London.

Bow Road police station is listed. It is opposite Thames Magistrates Court. It should not be confused with the historic Bow Street Police station in the City of Westminster near Covent Garden.
