= Shenfield Hall =

House in Brentwood, Essex, England

Coordinates: 51°37′58″N 0°19′06″E

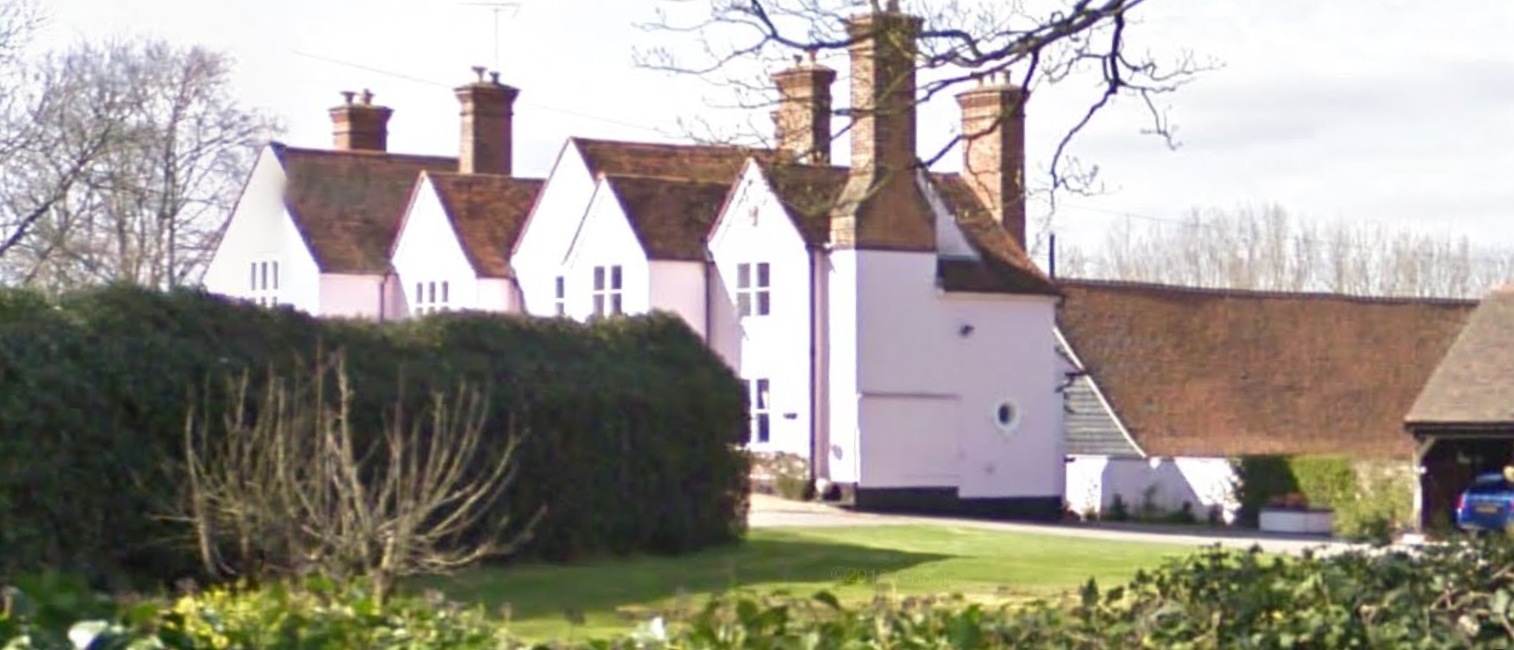
A side view of Shenfield Hall from Hall Lane, 2008

Shenfield Hall is a Grade II listed medieval building in the Essex town of Shenfield, England.

== History ==
Shenfield Hall dates back to the 16th and 17th centuries, and is a medieval building. Shenfield Hall produced milk, which was sold at the dairy in Brentwood High Street, now a branch of Wetherspoons called "The Dairyman". It was listed as a Grade II building in 1958. Most of the house still remains today, although some parts have been added on in the 18th and 19th centuries, as well as in the 21st century, such as a double garage which was added in 2002. Shenfield Hall Farm, adjacent to the hall, has Grade II listed barns, which have now been restored as barn conversions. These were listed in 1994.

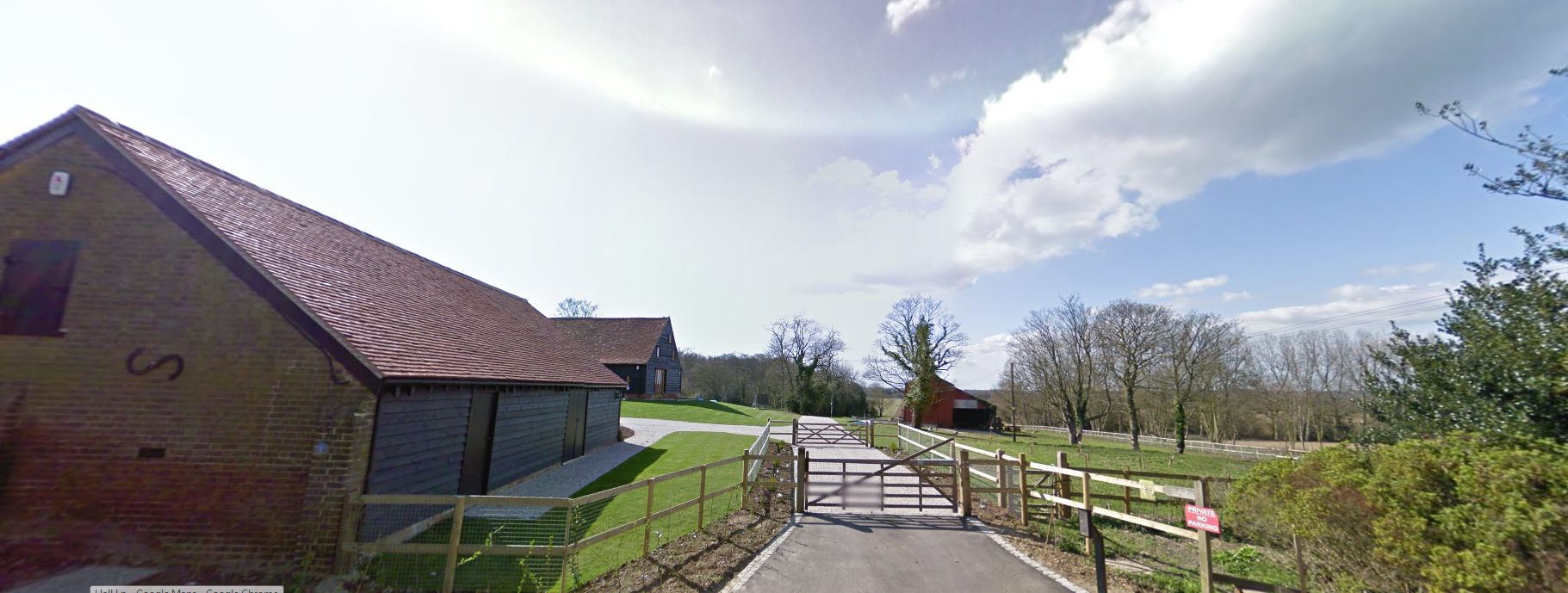
The barns at Shenfield Hall Farm

== Location ==
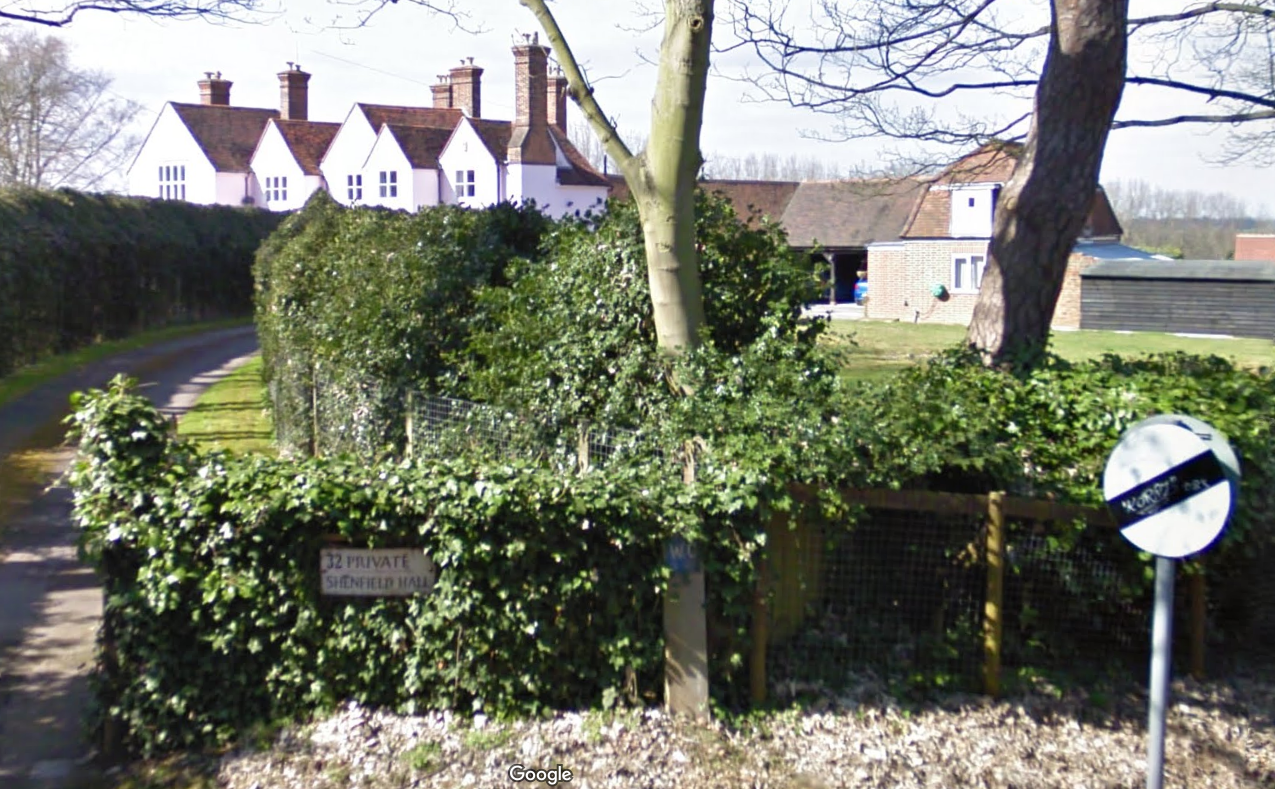
Shenfield Hall

Shenfield Hall is located in the town of Shenfield, a suburb of Brentwood in Essex. Shenfield was a village on the London to Colchester Road, which was a Roman Road (the A12). The A12 now bypasses Brentwood and the former A12 is now known as the A1023, and runs parallel to the A12 bypass. Shenfield Hall is located at number 32, Hall Lane, CM15 9AL. It is opposite the Courage Playing Fields and the A12 runs behind the hall, although there are many fields between the A12 and Shenfield Hall. The rooftop of Shenfield Hall and the adjacent barns can be seen from the A12 at Shenfield.

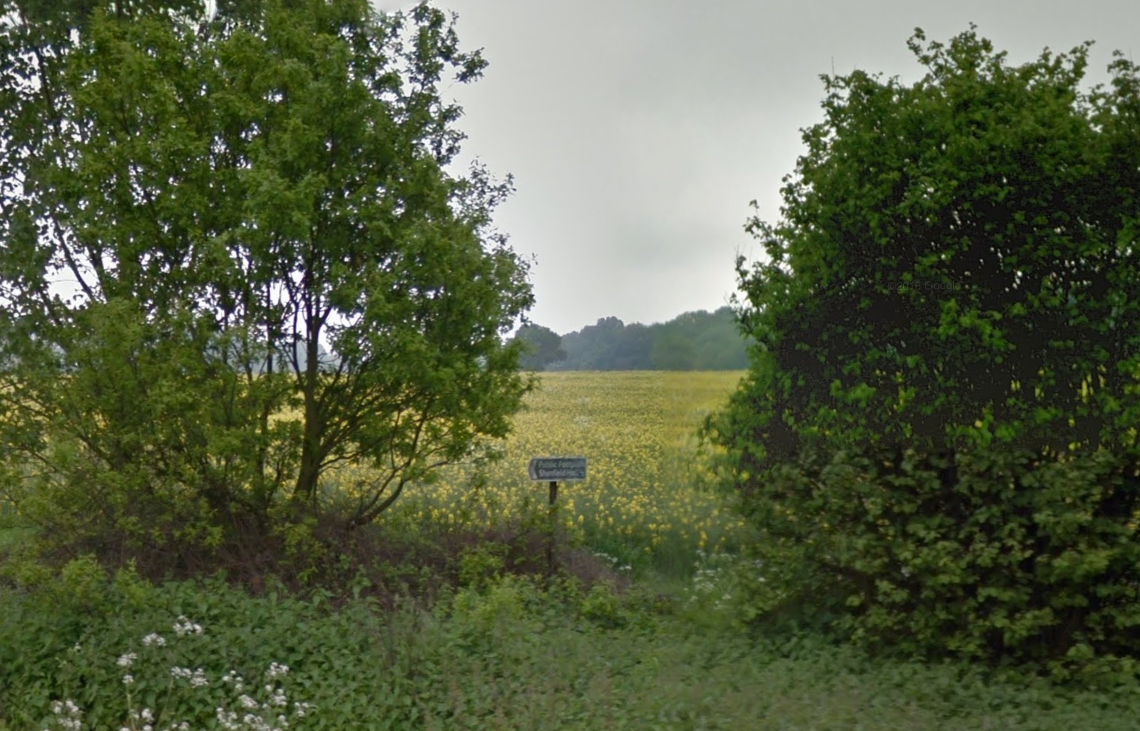
The footpath to Shenfield Hall from the A12

Shenfield Hall is next to St. Mary's Church, the parish church of Shenfield, and Shenfield Hall Farm. There is a public footpath running from the A12 bypass to Shenfield Hall Farm. Many woods are nearby, like Hall Wood, also known as Bluebell Wood. St. Mary's Primary school is opposite the church. The town centre is only a few minutes away, despite the hall being in quite a rural location.

== Exterior ==
The exterior of the hall is a traditional pink colour, common on many buildings in Essex and East Anglia, and is timber framed. There are several large chimneys. There are large hedgerows outside as well as a long driveway and gates. There is also a double garage on the driveway.

== Equestrian facilities ==
There are stables on the entrance to Shenfield Hall Farm, and there is an equestrian centre, All Seasons Equestrian Centre, which is on the farm.
