= Heybridge =

Heybridge may refer to:

- Heybridge, Brentwood, Essex, England
- Heybridge, Maldon, Essex, England
  - home to Heybridge Swifts F.C. and Heybridge Basin
- Heybridge, Tasmania, Australia
