= Bow cinema murder =

1934 murder in East London, England

The Bow cinema murder occurred on 7 August 1934 in Bow Road, East London, where 19-year-old John Frederick Stockwell, an attendant at the Eastern Palace Cinema on that road, attacked his manager Dudley Henry Hoard with an axe. Stockwell was arrested by the police in Great Yarmouth four days later. He admitted at his subsequent trial that he had stolen £90 of the cinema's takings and attacked Hoard when the latter tried to stop him removing a suitcase in which it was hidden. Stockwell was found guilty of murder and sentenced to be hanged at Pentonville Prison, which he was on 14 November 1934.

== Murderer's background ==
Stockwell was born in Manchester on 31 March 1915. His father, also named John Stockwell, was killed in November 1915 during the Gallipoli Campaign while serving with the Manchester Regiment. Stockwell's mother died soon after, and he spent the rest of his childhood and youth in various Salvation Army orphanages.

== Events of 7 August 1934 ==
On the morning of 7 August 1934, Dudley Henry Hoard, manager of the Eastern Palace Cinema on Bow Road, London, was attacked by an axe after answering the door. He received fourteen blows to the head and was left for dead. Cleaners later arrived at the cinema and found the partially clothed body of Hoard, with multiple wounds and fractures to the skull. Hoard's wife, Maisie, was found alive but unconscious with a wound to her head. After being taken to hospital, she described the attacker as a young man of about 19. The following day police found a bloodied axe in a storage room behind the stage. A bloody thumbprint, identified as being made by somebody other than Hoard, was found on one of the walls.

Hoard's body was taken to his mother's home in Croydon and he was buried at Croydon Cemetery on 13 August.

== Investigation ==
On 10 August police in Lowestoft received a letter confessing to Hoard's murder at 7:40 am on 7 August, signed J. F. Stockwell. John Stockwell, a 19-year-old employee at the Eastern Palace Cinema, had not been a suspect as 7 August was his day off. His clothes, wristwatch, Post Office savings book, and an apparent suicide note were found on a Lowestoft beach later that day. However, holidaymakers had spotted a young man placing the clothes on the beach and notified police when news of the confession letter was made public.

The following day a young man fitting Stockwell's description checked into the Metropolitan Hotel in Great Yarmouth. He aroused the suspicion of the hotel manager by giving his address as Luton, Hertfordshire, whereas Luton is in Bedfordshire. When Stockwell arrived back at the hotel after a shopping expedition he was confronted by Yarmouth police and taken into custody for questioning. A large crowd had gathered at Bow Road waiting for him, though only around 30 remained when he arrived.

== Trial and execution ==
Stockwell was charged with murder and brought before the Thames Magistrates' Court on 13 August. He did not enter a plea and was remanded until 21 August.

At his next appearance he admitted to stealing £90 from the cinema takings and hiding it in a suitcase on the premises. On the morning of 7 August he arrived at the cinema claiming to have left some personal money there the night before, and asked Hoard if he could look for it. When Stockwell tried to retrieve the case, Hoard tried to stop him. Stockwell then hit Hoard several times with an axe he had concealed under his coat. Mrs Hoard came to investigate the noise. Stockwell hit her once before hiding the axe and fleeing with the money.

On 22 October 1934 Stockwell formally pleaded guilty to the charge of murder. He was sentenced to death by hanging by Mr Justice Goddard and executed at HM Prison Pentonville a few weeks later, on 14 November.
