= John Stockwell =

John Stockwell may refer to:

- John Frederick Stockwell (1915−1934), British murderer convicted of the Bow cinema murder in 1934
- John Stockwell (CIA officer) (1937–2026), American CIA officer and activist
- John Stockwell (actor) (born 1961), American actor
