= College of Technology London =

Former private college in London, England

The College of Technology London (CTL) was a private college in Bow Road, offering full-time degrees in Information technology and management in partnership with the University of Wales, Lampeter, including the MBA.
