= A118 road =

Road in London, England

Coordinates: 51.5486°N 0.0410°E

A118

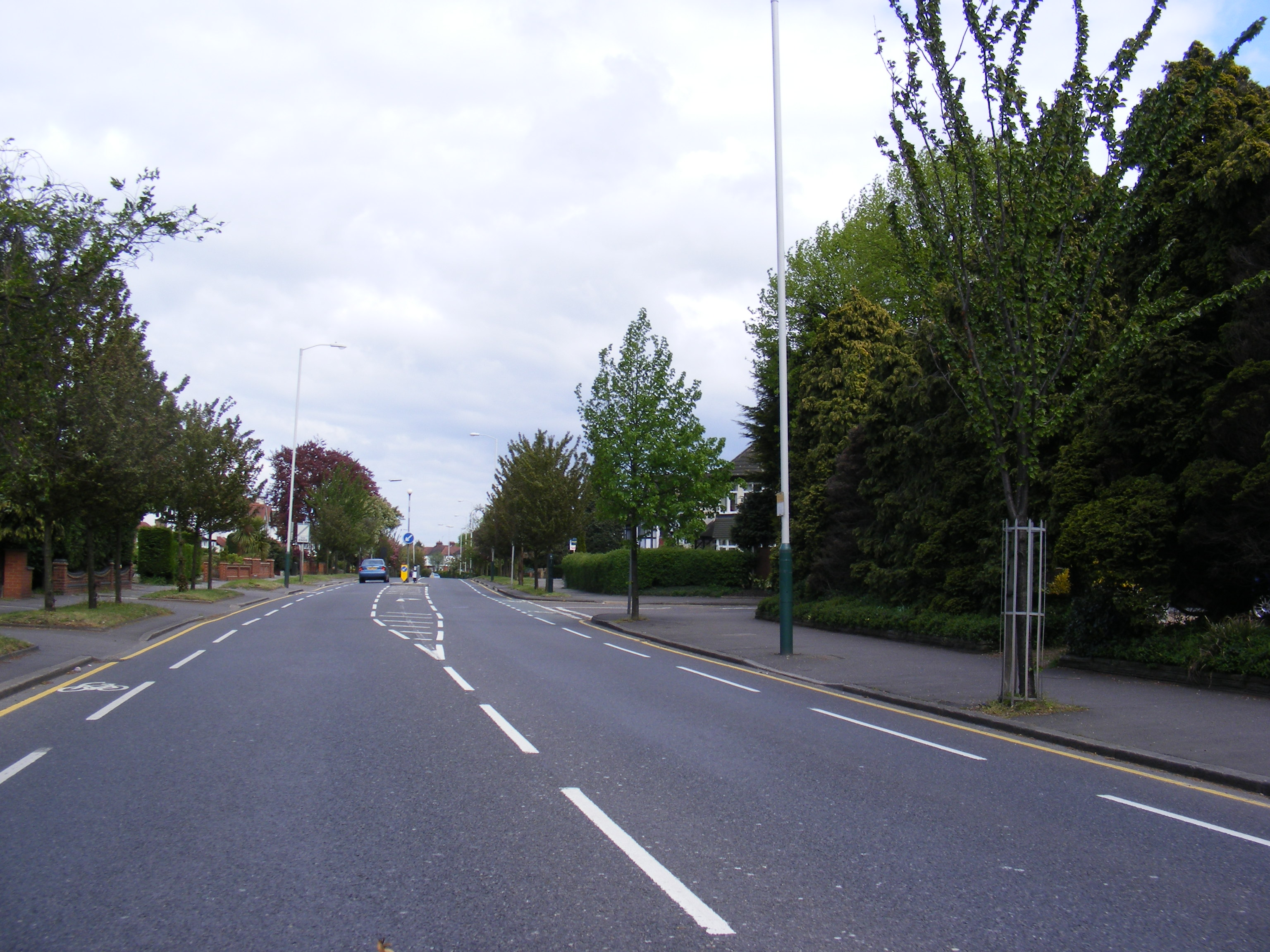
- A118 Main Road, Gidea Park

Route information
- Length: 11.3 mi (18.2 km)

Major junctions
- West end: Bow
- A11; A12 A112 A114 A117 A116 A406 A123 A1083 A125 A1251 A127; A12
- East end: Romford

Location
- Country: United Kingdom

Road network
- Roads in the United Kingdom; Motorways; A and B road zones
← A117	→ A119

The A118 is a road in east London, England which links Bow Interchange with Gallows Corner in Romford via Stratford and Ilford.

== History ==
The section from Bow Interchange to Gallows Corner formed the original route of the A12 until the designation was transferred to the Eastern Avenue soon after the latter opened in 1925. Parts of the route have an even older pedigree, forming the Camulodunum (Colchester) to Londinium (London) extension of the Pye Road.

== Western extension ==
Recently, the A118 was extended westwards from its former terminus at Stratford to Bow, taking over the former A11 Stratford High Street when the A12 extension opened in 1999. Thus 70 years after the Eastern Avenue was built, the A12 finally by-passed the whole of the A118, unlike the situation previously, where the A12 ended on the A11 due north of Stratford at Leytonstone.

== Road names ==
The road is known as Romford Road for much its length in the London Borough of Newham, High Road while in the London Borough of Redbridge and the London Borough of Barking and Dagenham and London Road while in the London Borough of Havering. A final section linking Romford with Gallows Corner is known as Main Road.

== Bypasses ==
The path of the road has been altered to bypass Ilford and Romford town centres.

== 86 bus route ==
The road is served by London Buses route 86 for most its length along with 174 and 498 using the Main Road stretch.with other routes serving various sections. The same route is also followed by part of the Great Eastern Main Line.

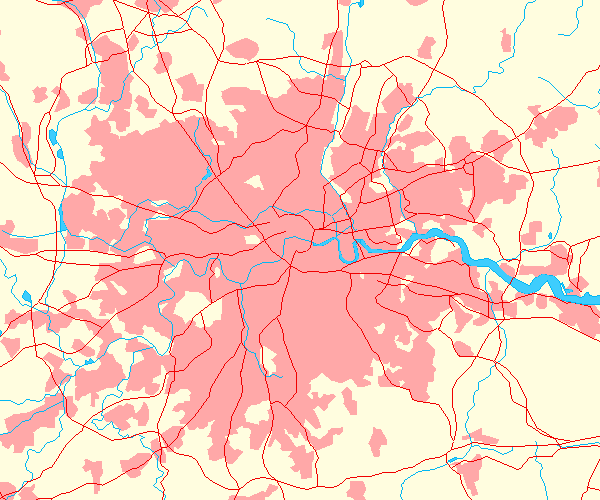
