= Eastern Avenue, London =

Road in Greater London, England

Coordinates: 51°33′5.48″N 0°1′4.12″W

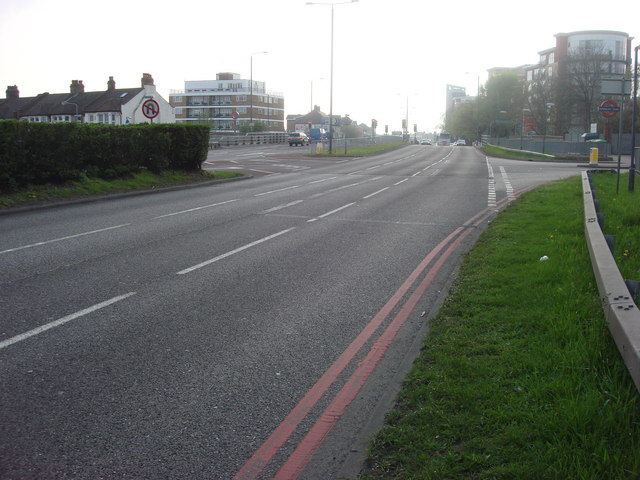
Eastern Avenue passing Newbury Park tube station

The Eastern Avenue is one of the main roads leading out of London. The 10-mile (16 km) road is part of the A12, a 129-mile road connecting Blackwall in London with the seaside town of Lowestoft in Suffolk.

== Route ==
The road starts at the end of the A12 Hackney Wick to M11 Link Road, a section of the A12 built in 1999 to bypass Wanstead and to link it with the former A102 (M) (now A12). It meets the Redbridge Roundabout, where the A12 meets the North Circular (A406). Prior to 1989, the road was the M15, providing a direct link onto the M11 motorway. It then heads down to the Gants Hill Roundabout near Ilford. It passes through a very built up area, and heads through Newbury Park, passing Newbury Park tube station. It then passes William Torbit School. A few miles further east it loops around the north of the suburban town of Romford. After this, it ends at the Gallows Corner roundabout (a former execution site) where the A127 Southend Arterial Road branches off. Traffic wishing to go down to Southend on the A127 may use the flyover, built as a temporary measure in 1969, to avoid the roundabout. It was originally designed for the M12 motorway, which would have run from South Woodford at the M11 to the proposed Maplin Sands Airport in Southend-on-Sea.

== History ==
The road was built during the 1920s and 1930s as a bypass of the A12 (now A118), which went through Romford, Chadwell Heath, Goodmayes, Ilford before meeting the A11 at Stratford. It was originally designated the A106. By the mid-1940s, the road had been re-designated as the A12, with the old A12 being downgraded to the non-primary A118 road, which now ends at the A11 in Bow.

== M11 and A13 ==
The Eastern Avenue is mostly used by local traffic, because the M11 motorway, built in 1980, is effectively a complete bypass of the Eastern Avenue, and the A13 also provides a much quicker route into London. It is a slow road. as the speed limits are only 50 mph and 40 mph, and there are traffic lights at almost every junction, with roundabouts and frontal development. However, when there is traffic on the M25, heavy goods vehicles and other through traffic heading into London will often use the Eastern Avenue instead.

== See also ==
- Western Avenue, London
