= Thickthorn junction =

Thickthorn junction is a road junction located in the southwest of Norwich, which connects the A47 to the A11 and B1172.

== History ==
The area began as a roundabout between the A11 which has always run through the area, and the B1172 which connects the area to the villages of Hethersett and Wymondham. The roundabout was constructed when the Wymondham bypass was constructed, so as to connect the A11 and B1172.

When the A47 Norwich Southern Bypass was built, so was a major interchange to serve the area. The interchange was opened in September 1992, and has since been criticised as inadequate for the volume of traffic that uses it.

== Upgrades ==
In 2025, work began to redevelop parts of the Thickthorn Interchange for a greater volume of traffic. The surrounding area of Cringleford is planned to be enlarged with up to 3,000 new residential dwellings in the area.

The plans are estimated to cost between £216 and £239 million, and are scheduled to be completed between 2028 and 2029.
