= Margaretting =

Village in Essex, England

Coordinates: 51°41′N 0°25′E

- Village
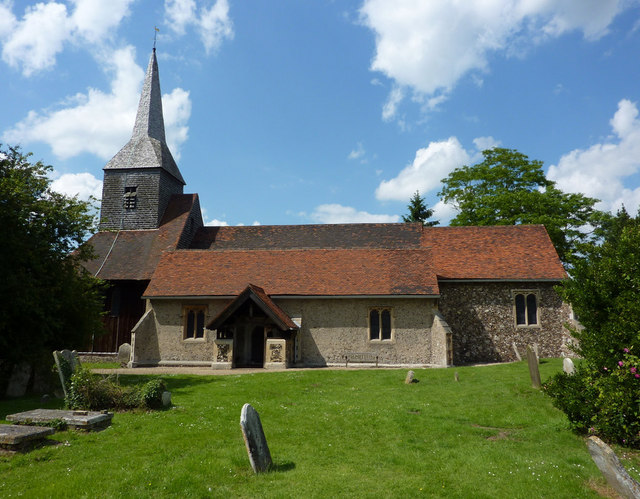
- St Margaret's Church

- Location within Essex
- Population: 887 (Parish, 2021)
- Civil parish: Margaretting
- District: Chelmsford
- Shire county: Essex
- Region: East
- Country: England
- Sovereign state: United Kingdom
- Police: Essex
- Fire: Essex
- Ambulance: East of England
- UK Parliament: Maldon

Margaretting is a village and civil parish in the Chelmsford district of Essex, England. The village is located on the B1002 road approximately four miles from Chelmsford (the county town of Essex) and two miles from the village of Ingatestone. It is near to the River Wid. At the 2021 census the parish had a population of 887.

== Amenities ==
The 15th-century St Margaret's Church is situated about a mile from the village.

Margaretting has a primary school. The village hall and playing field are situated in Wantz Road and host local football teams.

There are currently two public houses, the Black Bull and the Red Lion; a third, the Spread Eagle, was closed following fire damage.

== Transport ==
Margaretting lies on the B1002 road, which links to the A414 towards Chelmsford, and is bypassed by the A12.

The village is served by First Essex's 351 route between Warley, Brentwood and Chelmsford.

The nearest National Rail station is at Ingatestone; Greater Anglia provides regular services to London Liverpool Street, Chelmsford, Braintree, Colchester, Clacton and Ipswich.
