= Bow Interchange =

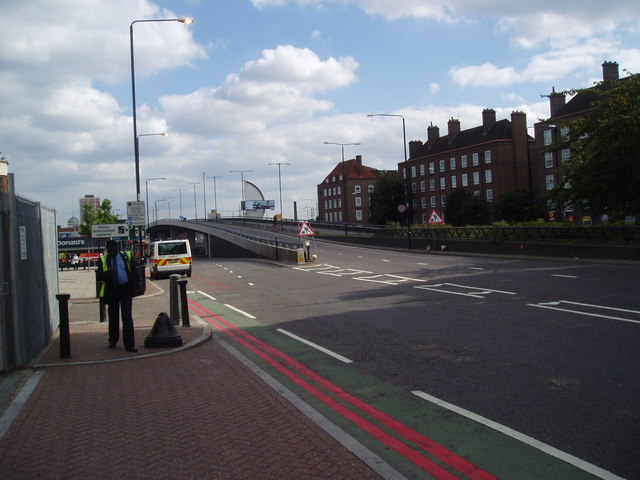
- View of the Bow Interchange in 2005
- Interactive map of Bow Interchange

Location
- Bow, Stratford and Bromley-by-Bow, England
- Coordinates: 51.52969°N 0.01412°W
- Roads at junction: A11 (Bow Road); A12 (East Cross Route); A118 (Stratford High Street)

Construction
- Type: Roundabout interchange

Bow Interchange is a busy grade-separated road junction in London, England, on the East Cross Route (part of the A12 road) between Bow, Stratford, and Bromley-by-Bow at a point where the London Boroughs of Tower Hamlets and Newham meet. It is a triple-level junction where the East Cross Route (the A12), Bow Road (the A11 road), and Stratford High Street (the A118 road) meet. The River Lea runs underneath the junction.

The East Cross Route is a major road in East London which runs north to the North Circular Road and south to the Blackwall Tunnel.

== Construction ==
It was built by W. & C. French. A £1.447m contract was awarded in February 1965, to start in early March 1965, to take 28 months, with a 1,450ft dual-carriageway road viaduct. It opened in 1967.

== Cycling ==
Cycle Superhighway 2 CS2 runs from Stratford to Aldgate via the roundabout east to west. Following the deaths of two cyclists at the roundabout in late 2013 and pressure from the London Cycling Campaign, Transport for London began introducing measures to improve safety for cyclists and other road users at the junction.

== Public transport ==
The nearest stations are Bow Church DLR station and Bromley-by-Bow tube station.
