= A1023 road =

Road in Essex, England

A1023

Route information
- Length: 4.5 mi (7.2 km)

Major junctions
- Southwest end: M25 Junction 28
- M25; A12; A128; A129; A12
- Northeast end: A12

Location
- Country: United Kingdom
- Constituent country: England
- Primary destinations: Brentwood, Shenfield

Road network
- Roads in the United Kingdom; Motorways; A and B road zones
← A1022	→ A1024

The A1023 is an A-road in Essex, England that goes from junction 28 on the M25 (Note: 51.6084°N 0.2640°E) through Brentwood to the A12. (Note: 51.6455°N 0.3439°E) The road was originally a Roman road which linked London and Colchester. It opened in 1966, after the A12 was re-routed along the current Brentwood Bypass.

== Route ==
The A1023 starts at junction 28 of the M25 (also known as Brook Street Interchange), and then heads northeast as Brook Street into Brentwood. While Going through Brentwood the road changes name to London Road, (Note: 51.6122°N 0.2756°E) High Street, (Note: 51.6184°N 0.2945°E) then Shenfield road, where it meets the A128 at Wilson's Corner junction. (Note: 51.6213°N 0.3057°E) At Wilson's Corner northbound traffic follows Ongar Road towards Chipping Ongar and the A414, whilst southbound traffic follows Ingrave Road towards Ingrave and then on to the Southend Arterial Road (A127). The road then continues northeast from Wilson's Corner, where it meets with the western end of the A129, (Note: 51.6306°N 0.3211°E) which goes towards Sheffield station, Hutton and Billericay. It then continues as Chelmsford Road until it meets the A12 again at the Maryland Interchange.

== History ==
When the roads were first numbered in 1922 the A1023 number was originally given to a small 1.5 mile (2.4 kilometers) long road in Norfolk, going through Crimplesham from the A134 (Note: 52.6077°N 0.4603°E) to the A1122 (then numbered the A47). (Note: 52.6095°N 0.4314°E) The road was reclassified as a spur of the A134 in the 1935 Road numbering revision, but later became unclassified sometime after 1970. In 1966, after the A12 was re-routed along the current Brentwood Bypass, the former route was allocated the A1023, with the west end of the road slightly shifted to make room for a new roundabout.

== Junctions ==
County	Location	mi	km	Coord	Destinations	Notes
Greater London	—	0	0	(Note: 51.6084°N 0.2640°E)	M25 – Dartford crossing, Stansted airport, Watford A12 – London, Romford, Chelmsford	
Essex	Brentwood	2.0	3.2	(Note: 51.6192°N 0.2978°E)	B185 – Brentwood railway station, Great Warley	
Essex	Brentwood	1.6	2.6	(Note: 51.6213°N 0.3057°E)	A128 – Ingrave, Brentwood railway station, Chipping Ongar	
Essex	Brentwood	3.0	4.8	(Note: 51.6305°N 0.3211°E)	A129 – Billericay, Hutton, Shenfield railway station	
Essex	—	4.5	7.2	(Note: 51.6455°N 0.3439°E)	A12 – London, Harwich, Chelmsford B1002 – Mountnessing, Ingatestone	
1.000 mi = 1.609 km; 1.000 km = 0.621 mi: Concurrency terminus; Incomplete access

*Ceremonial Counties

Coordinate list
