= A11 road (England) =

Road in England

A11

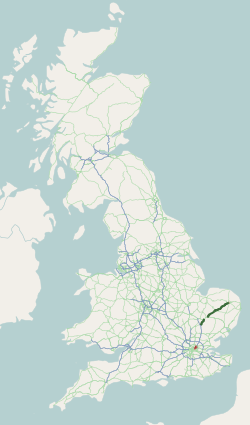

Route information
- Maintained by National Highways and Transport for London Road Network
- Length: 112.4 mi (180.9 km)

Major junctions
- Western end: Aldgate, City of London
- A13; A12 M11 A505; A14 ( A142) A1101 A1065 A134 A1066; A47 A140
- Eastern end: Norwich

Location
- Country: United Kingdom
- Constituent country: England
- Primary destinations: Whitechapel; Bow; Newmarket; Thetford; Bishop's Stortford; Harlow; Woodford

Road network
- Roads in the United Kingdom; Motorways; A and B road zones
| ← A10 | → A12 |

The A11 is a major trunk road in England. It originally ran roughly north east from London to Norwich, Norfolk. It now consists of a short section in Inner London and a much longer section in Cambridgeshire, Suffolk and Norfolk. The lengthy section between these was renumbered as a result of the opening of the M11 in the 1970s and then the A12 extension in 1999.

It also multiplexes/overlaps with the A14 on the Newmarket bypass.

== Route ==
=== City of London ===
All this part has been declassified and is now a minor road. Thus the A11 now starts at Aldgate, just inside the eastern boundary of the City of London. The first stretch is Whitechapel High Street, east of the junction with Mansell Street. In a complex reworking of the roads since the days of the Aldgate gyratory system, it is two-way, but the east-bound section is part of the ring-road that retained a one-way system south of this junction, but the westbound section is for local access and motorists have to U-turn to avoid entering the congestion charging zone.

=== Tower Hamlets ===
East of Aldgate station, the A11 enters the London Borough of Tower Hamlets, it becomes Whitechapel High Street (containing Aldgate East Underground station), again part of the Aldgate one-way system. The A11 passes through Whitechapel, past Whitechapel station and the Royal London Hospital.

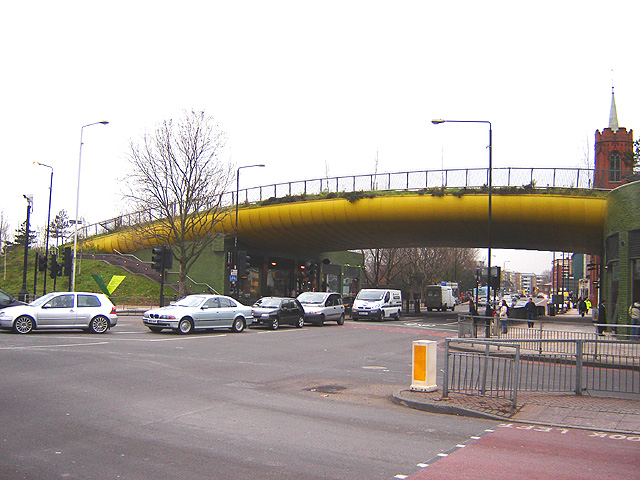
The A11 is named Mile End Road where it runs through Mile End; the Green Bridge carries Mile End Park over the A11 / Mile End Road

It becomes Mile End Road at the eastern end of Whitechapel Road, at Mile End Gate, the former toll gate for the turnpike. It passes Stepney Green Underground station, with Stepney to the south, and continues through Mile End, passing the Mile End Underground station. Next, as it continues through Bow, it becomes Bow Road, passing Bow Road Underground station and Bow Church DLR station.

There is a dual carriageway flyover over the Bow Interchange roundabout, a junction with the A12. However at the end of the flyover, as the road crosses into the London Borough of Newham, the A11 designation disappears and it instead becomes the A118. This renumbering followed the opening of the A12 extension in 1999, to make the former A11 seem a less important road and encourage traffic to use the new dual carriageway between there and Leytonstone.

=== Cambridgeshire and Suffolk ===
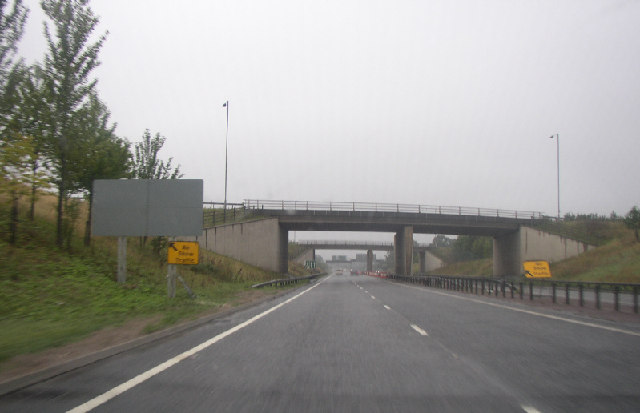
Passing south underneath the A1307 Junction near to Babraham, Cambridgeshire.

The road number A11 reappears at M11 Junction 9A on the border between Essex and Cambridgeshire, and it is now a trunk road. It roughly follows the route of a Roman road for the remainder of its length.

The A11 formerly went through Newmarket; that stretch is now the A1304. The Newmarket bypass, opened to traffic in July 1975, is a dual carriageway. The western end is the A11, but most of its length is a multiplex/overlap with the A14. The A11 re-appears north-east of Newmarket, and remained a dual carriageway. The road bypasses Barton Mills before entering Norfolk in the Thetford Forest, passing the 113-foot-tall (34 m) Elveden War Memorial. This section of the road opened as a dual carriageway on 12 December 2014. This completes the dualling of the trunk road between Norwich and London.

=== Norfolk ===
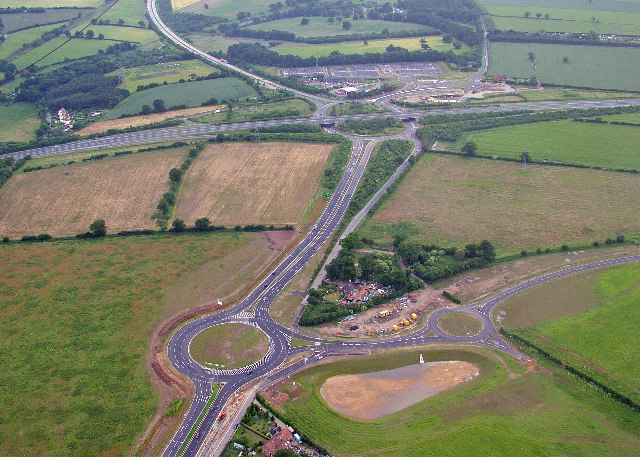
Thickthorn Junction between the A47 and A11.

The upgrading of the final section of single carriageway 'Thetford Straight' between Barton Mills and Thetford (opened December 2014) means the road is dual carriageway all the way to Norwich. The road continues northeast bypassing Thetford, Attleborough and Wymondham. The A11 originally ran through the centre of all three towns giving rise to congestion which frequently became the focus of delays on the route. It also passes the Snetterton Circuit motor racing venue. On entering Norwich, it becomes single carriageway again and is called Newmarket Road. It terminates at the St Stephens Street roundabout near the city centre.

Various sections of the A11 between the junction with the M11 in Cambridgeshire and Norwich have recently been upgraded to dual carriageway. The Roudham Heath to Attleborough section was dualled in 2003 and the Attleborough bypass was dualed in 2007. The previously single carriageway road between Thetford and the Fiveways roundabout is now dual carriageway and opened in December 2014.

== Cycling ==
=== London ===
Cycleway 2 (C2) runs alongside the A11 between Aldgate and the A12 in Bow. One-way cycle tracks run along either side of the A11 through Whitechapel, Mile End, and Bow, carrying cyclists from the City to Stratford. The route runs unbroken; the route is signposted and marked using blue paint and cycle icons.

At Bow, where the A11 meets the A12, C2 leaves the main carriageway along slip roads, and cyclists may congregate at an Advanced Stop Line - in both directions - to cross the roundabout, rejoining the main carriageway on the other side of the roundabout. East of Bow, C2 runs along either side of the A118 to Stratford station, and cycle lanes are provided as far as Ilford.

=== Norwich ===
The Wymondham to Sprowston Pedalway runs along the A11/Newmarket Road. To the west, the Pedalway joins the A11 at Eaton. Westbound destinations include Cringleford, Hethersett, and Wymondham. Running northeast, the Pedalway is signposted along a shared-use path adjacent to the Newmarket-bound (westbound) carriageway. The route crosses the A140/Daniels Road and continues along Newmarket Road as a shared-use path. It leaves the A11 in a northerly direction at the junction with the A1056/Ipswich Road. The route runs through Norwich City Centre to Sprowston.

== Improvements ==
=== A11 Fiveways – Thetford Improvement (complete) ===
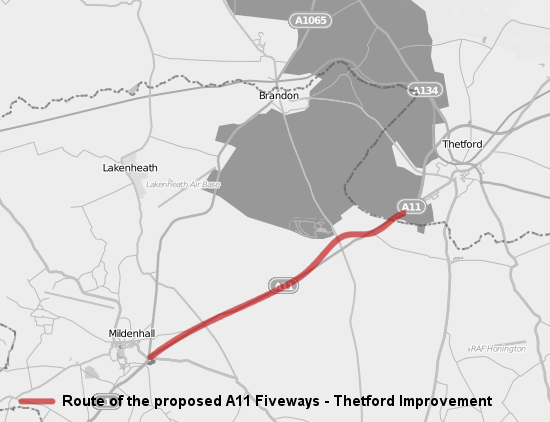
- The location of the proposed Fiveways – Thetford Improvement
- Location: Suffolk, Norfolk
- Proposer: Highways Agency
- Cost estimate: £113-157m (8/08)
- Start date: 2012
- Completion date: 2014
- Stakeholders: Highways Agency
- Geometry: KML

Proposals to dual 14.8 km of the road between the Fiveways Roundabout at Barton Mills, bypassing Elveden to the North and joining the western end of the Thetford Bypass had been discussed for many years without any developments being made. Draft Orders together with an Environmental Statement were published in Autumn 2008. The Labour government's Secretary of State for Transport announced the scheme would be brought forward by 18 months to 2010 with an open date of 2013 in November 2008 in response to the 2008 financial crisis. Supporters expressed concern in September 2010 that the scheme would be cancelled as part of the coalition government's comprehensive spending review noting that the report from the public inquiry had not yet been signed off by the Department for Transport.

The Highways Agency has published an official map of the proposed scheme and a Google overlay map is also available. The original cost estimate was £30 million rising to £60 million in March 2007 and then to £113-£157 million by August 2008.

The project received strong support from local business groups and local government and was expected to reduce journey times by 3 minutes off-peak and up to 25 minutes at peak times. Environmental campaign groups believed that in a time of economic downturn it would be better to invest in local public transport rather than on costly road schemes. On 20 October 2010, the government approved the scheme, indicating that the works would continue. The Elveden Bypass opened during Easter 2014 with one lane in use each way. The full dual carriageway between Barton Mills and Thetford was opened on 12 December 2014 by transport secretary Patrick McLoughlin.

=== Thickthorn Junction improvements ===
National Highways has proposed an improvement to Thickthorn Junction, where the A11 meets the A47. The new junction will have two free-flow slip roads between the A11 and the A47. This scheme was the subject of a legal challenge, alongside the plans to dual the A47 between Blofield and North Burlingham. The £153m million contract was awarded to Skanska with the new junction to open in 2028/29.

== Former sections ==
=== City of London ===
Originally, the A11 started at the Bank of England in the City of London, next to Bank Underground station, and went eastwards along Cornhill and Leadenhall Street, past Aldgate Pump and along Aldgate. Hence leading to the current A11 starting point at Aldgate.

=== Newham ===
From Bow Interchange, A118 briefly becomes a dual carriageway as it crosses the valley of the River Lea. This dual carriageway section ends at Stratford town centre, and was a one-way system until 16 September 2018, the eastbound road of which, Great Eastern Road, passed Stratford station. The formerly westbound road is now two way, called Broadway and The Grove; the latter road runs north–south. The old A11 then becomes Leytonstone Road; Maryland railway station turns northwards on the corner where the name change occurs. Meanwhile, the A118 heads eastward along its route towards Ilford and Romford. The A112 also joins the one-way system, heading north–south.

=== Waltham Forest ===
North of Maryland, the old A11 crosses from the London Borough of Newham into the London Borough of Waltham Forest and becomes High Road Leytonstone, passing under the Gospel Oak to Barking line.

=== Redbridge ===
Once past the Green Man Interchange, the former A11 route enters the London Borough of Redbridge and briefly becomes a southern extension to the A113 before turning into the A1199 (a duplicate designation, given that there is another A1199 in Islington), and is called Hollybush Hill, Woodford Road and High Road Woodford Green. It crosses over the A406 at Gates Corner (named after a Ford car showroom, which was turned into residential flats in 2006), but since the A406 was widened when the M11 was constructed there are no slip roads for interchange and the old A11 passes over the top. It merges with the A104 Woodford New Road by the Statue of Winston Churchill and becomes the A104 High Road Woodford Green. North, the road was A11 until the M11 opened in the 1970s, triggering the downgrading of the A11 between Woodford and Stump Cross (see below). Just before leaving London for Essex, the A104 becomes Epping New Road.

=== Essex, Hertfordshire and Cambridgeshire ===
Shortly after entering Essex, the A11 enters Epping Forest, following the mainly straight course of the Epping New Road turnpike constructed during the second quarter of the nineteenth century, alongside the boundary between Waltham Abbey and Loughton. It then reaches the Wake Arms Roundabout and becomes the B1393. Just after leaving the forest, it crosses the M25 motorway (here lowered into a cut-and-cover tunnel), then continuing through Epping. The B1393 ends at junction 7 of the M11, and the route of the A11 goes along the A414 through the eastern suburbs of Harlow, having been rerouted slightly to the west at the end of the 1950s to avoid passing through Potter Street. The road then becomes the A1184 and goes through Sawbridgeworth: through the rest of the Essex stretch between Harlow and Stump Cross the road follows a more traditionally English course, characterised by bends of varying and sometimes uneven radii, with just one straight mile (1.6 km) (to the south of Littlebury) along the north Essex stretch.

At Thorley Wash, just south of Bishop's Stortford, the A1184 turns sharp left to become part of the Bishop's Stortford bypass, but the route of the A11 becomes the B1383 and goes through Thorley Street, Bishop's Stortford, Stansted Mountfitchet, and Quendon. It crosses the M11 and passes Audley End. The B1383 ends at 9A (Stump Cross), the end of a spur that comes off the M11 at Junction 9, near Great Chesterford. From there, the former A11 section aligns once more with the current A11.
