= Gallows Corner =

Road junction in Romford, Greater London, England

Coordinates: 51.592°N 0.217°E

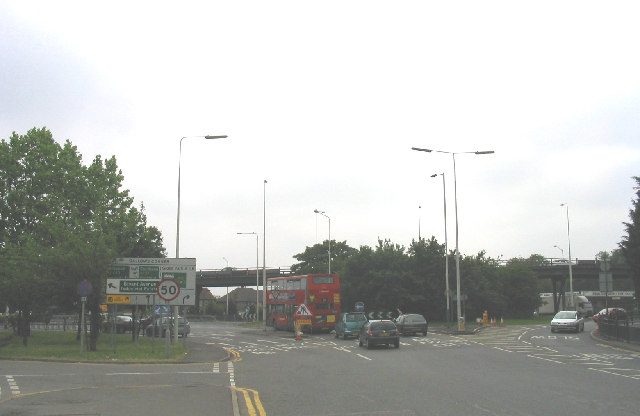
- Gallows Corner in 2005

- Location within Greater London
- OS grid reference: TQ535905
  - Charing Cross: 15.8 mi (25.4 km) WSW
- London borough: Havering
- Ceremonial county: Greater London
- Region: London
- Country: England
- Sovereign state: United Kingdom
- Post town: ROMFORD
- Postcode district: RM2, RM3
- Dialling code: 01708
- Police: Metropolitan
- Fire: London
- Ambulance: London
- UK Parliament: Romford
- London Assembly: Havering and Redbridge

Gallows Corner is a major road junction in the London Borough of Havering, East London. It forms the junction of the A12 road with the A127 Southend Arterial Road. Situated on the ancient Hornchurch/Romford boundary, it was the location of the gallows of the manor and liberty of Havering-atte-Bower. In March 1925, a new arterial road from London to Southend-on-Sea was opened through the site, increasing the importance of the junction. It became an accident blackspot immediately after opening, with peak traffic experienced on summer bank holiday weekends.

The junction became a roundabout in September 1931. The A12 to the west and A127 to the east were upgraded to dual carriageways in the 1930s. In 1957, the roundabout was enlarged and the road layout was altered. By 1967, it was one of the worst traffic bottlenecks in London and had become notorious for delays. In March 1970, a prefabricated flyover was opened as a temporary structure connecting the A127 in the east to the A12 in the west. The flyover had required repeated maintenance work from 1986 until it was replaced by a new structure in 2026.

== History ==
Gallows Corner original layout and site of gallows

The gallows of the manor of Havering-atte-Bower were located on the London–Colchester road, at a spot known as Gallows Corner. They were in use before Havering became an independent jurisdiction in 1465. The corner was located on the Hornchurch/Romford boundary at a point where it switched from an east–west alignment along the ancient London–Colchester road to a north-south alignment. The gallows had ceased to be used by 1815. The corner was a three-way junction. To the north was Gallows Road, that was later renamed Straight Road.

=== Road junction ===
Work commenced in 1921 on a new arterial road between London and Southend-on-Sea. Gallows Corner, already on the London–Colchester road, became the junction between the Eastern Avenue section from Wanstead and the rest of the road to Southend. The single carriageway arterial road was opened on 25 March 1925. The junction became a roundabout on 14 September 1931. It was 260 feet (79 m) long and 200 feet (61 m) wide, with a central island of 150 feet (46 m) by 90 feet (27 m). Plans were announced in March 1936 to make the road from Gallows Corner to Southend dual carriageway.

In 1936, as plans were made to extend the Central line along Eastern Avenue as part of the New Works Programme, there was a campaign to continue it beyond Newbury Park with a station at Gallows Corner. In October 1938, it was decided by the Minister of Transport that the Eastern Avenue would become dual carriageway throughout and take over the A12 designation. (Note: Three sections were single carriageway up until this date.) The roundabout was enlarged and the road layout was altered in 1957. (Note: Straight Road was rerouted from a three-way junction with the A12 road to the roundabout junction.) It was reported to be the biggest in the country with 3,000 vehicles an hour passing through it during the 5 August 1957 bank holiday. 3,500 vehicles an hour were recorded in July 1963.

=== Flyover ===
In August 1964, the Ministry of Transport proposed that the A12 from Gallows Corner to the Brentwood bypass would become dual carriageway and the congested roundabout would be replaced by a grade separated junction. This was one of nineteen recommended road improvement schemes, although no funding or schedule for the project was confirmed. In December 1967, the Greater London Council (GLC) proposed to construct a prefabricated flyover at a cost of £250,000 (equivalent to £3,983,533 in 2025).

Gallows Corner was identified as one of the worst traffic bottlenecks in London. It had become notorious for delays during summer weekends as people travelled to costal resorts. The plan required the consent of the transport minister, Barbara Castle, as it involved the A12 and A127 trunk roads. It was expected that the flyover would carry around one third of the junction traffic. A similar Braithwaite Fliway structure had been installed at Movers Lane on the Barking bypass with the work to assemble it taking eight days.

On 12 October 1965, plans for Radial Route 7 were announced by Tom Fraser, the Minister of Transport. The new motorway would start from South Woodford on the A406 North Circular Road, run to the north of the A12, and join it either west of Gallows Corner or at the start of the Brentwood bypass. It could provide an alternative to the inconvenience and expense of upgrading the A12 and the Gants Hill and Gallows Corner junctions. If completed in its entirety, it could have run between South Woodford and Brentwood, with a spur to Gallows Corner. In May 1969, the Minister of Transport indicated a more permanent flyover structure could be built at Gallows Corner at a cost of £350,000 (equivalent to £5,085,508 in 2025). Bernard Brooks-Partridge, GLC councillor for Havering, believed the additional expense for a more permanent structure indicated the Radial Route 7 spur to Gallows Corner was unlikely to be built for at least 25 years.

Works on the flyover commenced in July 1969. The foundations, roadworks and approach ramps were completed by Percy Bilton at a cost of £107,771 (equivalent to £1,565,915 in 2025). Flyover construction was undertaken by Braithwaite and Co Structural at a cost of £127,468 (equivalent to £1,852,113 in 2025). The structure was intended to be temporary and was the fourth of its type to be built. The prefabricated flyover was assembled over three days in February 1970. (Note: Work took place over five nights according to Braithwaite and Co Structural.) The flyover was opened temporarily for a few hours on 25 March 1970 in order to divert traffic away from an accident. The official opening took place at 11 am on 26 March 1970, with the Mayor of Havering cutting a ceremonial tape.

=== Renovation and replacement ===
Maintenance work was required that caused of a series of daytime closures of the flyover throughout 1986 and 1987. During Transport for London (TfL) maintenance work in April 2008, it was found that the bridge parapets had suffered corrosion and needed to be replaced. The flyover was fitted with temporary safety barriers which meant that traffic was restricted to one lane in the westbound (towards Central London) direction only from July 2008 to May 2009. The flyover reopened to two-way traffic on 22 July 2009.

From 2020, traffic on the deteriorating flyover was subject to a 20 miles per hour (32 km/h) speed limit and 7.5 tonnes (7.4 long tons; 8.3 short tons) weight limit. By October 2021, TfL indicated that a similar design would likely replace the flyover. It had been found that a more complex "Y" shaped structure would not be possible because of the constrained site. In November 2021, TfL warned that the structure might be closed if funding did not become available. By November 2023, funding from the Department for Transport had been secured. In February 2024, Costain were appointed by TfL to replace the flyover.

Works commenced in March 2025 to demolish and rebuild the flyover on the original foundations. There were lane closures from 10 March 2025, which were expected to cause long queues and delays. The junction was closed to normal traffic on 23 June 2025. It was expected to reopen in September 2025. In August 2025, TfL confirmed that the works would continue until October 2025 at the earliest, due to unforeseen problems with the water main replacement which was undertaken at the same time by Essex and Suffolk Water. In February 2026 a revised completion date of April 2026 was announced. The junction was partially reopened on 10 May 2026, with flyover traffic only in the eastbound direction. The flyover and junction were fully reopened on 21 September 2026.

=== Safety ===
The new junction at Gallows Corner immediately became an accident blackspot in 1925. Within a month of opening it was identified as one of the most dangerous points on the road and in need of action to avoid accidents. By mid-1925, the junction was manned, initially during the day by the AA and by the end of the year by a police constable who was illuminated at night. A wooden first aid hut was built at the junction. The AA provided a signpost illuminated by gas and a sentry box with a telephone. After the roundabout was built in 1931, a new British Red Cross first aid hut was provided.

The enlargement of the roundabout in 1957 was intended to reduce accidents and allow the junction to cope with the 2,000 vehicles an hour that travelled over the junction at the peak of summer. Over the 1960 Whitsun bank holiday weekend, a temporary 50 miles per hour (80 km/h) speed limit was placed on the arterial road through Gallows Corner to assess the impact on safety.

In 1965, the AA identified Gallows Corner as one of 21 traffic blackspots on main roads from London. As part of a national plan to deal with the worst locations, a 50 miles per hour (80 km/h) speed limit was introduced on the A12 for the 1 mile (1.6 km) of road east from Gallows Corner. In 1968, there were 53 accidents at Gallows Corner with 13 people injured. It was the worst location in Havering for accidents. Drivers entering the roundabout without due care was given as the likely cause by the Metropolitan Police and the introduction of traffic controls was recommended.

In 2008, the junction was considered one of the worst in London for accidents. In 2016, TfL identified excessive speed on approach and entry to the junction, drivers failing to give way and difficulty changing lanes as primary causes of accidents.

== Geography ==
Gallows Corner is located 2.8 kilometres (1.7 mi) northeast of Romford Market. The junction is a large roundabout with five exits and a flyover. The exits are:

- Westbound: A12 (Eastern Avenue), towards central London.
- South-westbound: A118 (Main Road), towards Romford.
- South-eastbound: A127 (Southend Arterial Road), towards Southend-on-Sea.
- North-eastbound: A12 (Colchester Road), towards East Anglia.
- Northbound: Straight Road, a minor road towards Harold Hill.

== In media ==
The junction is referred to in the film Layer Cake.
