= Heybridge, Brentwood =

Village in Essex, England

Coordinates: 51.65°N 00.35°E

Heybridge
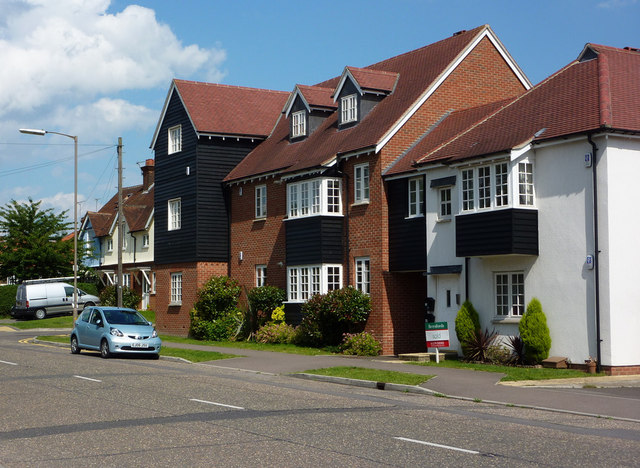

- Location within Essex
- Civil parish: Ingatestone and Fryerning
- District: Brentwood
- Shire county: Essex
- Region: East
- Country: England
- Sovereign state: United Kingdom

Heybridge is a village in the civil parish of Ingatestone and Fryerning, in the Brentwood borough of Essex, England, contiguous with the village of Ingatestone. The main development comprises a mixture of houses and bungalows which were built in 1954 on land owned by the Coal Board and an area of local authority housing.

It is on the course of a Roman Road. This was formerly the A12 road (England) until it was by-passed in the 1970s: Heybridge can be accessed from junction 13 of the A12 (Truelove's Interchange). The residential development is bounded by the railway line and River Wid to the south beyond which is rolling agricultural land.

Heybridge is within walking distance of Ingatestone railway station. Ingatestone Hall is nearby.
