= John Gibson (cartographer) =

John Gibson (flourished in London 1750 to his death in 1792) was an English cartographer, geographer, draughtsman and engraver.

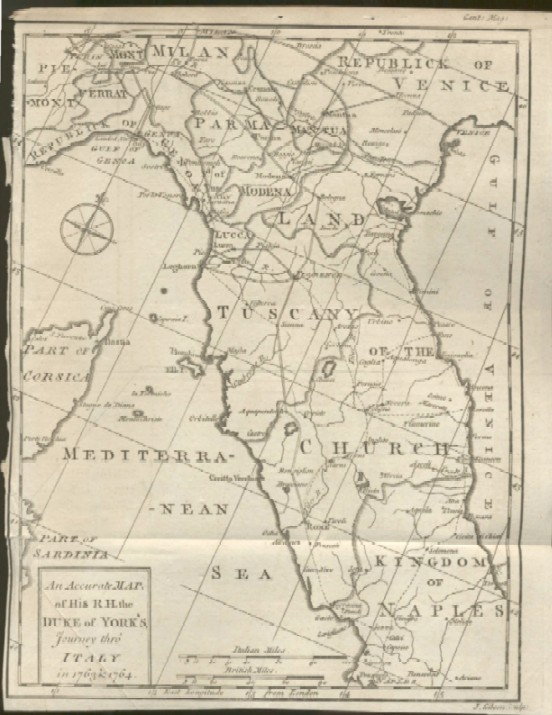
Accurate Map of His R.H. the Duke of York's Journey thro' Italy in 1763 & 1764 by John Gibson - The Gentleman's Magazine

Recognized as an important late eighteenth-century British cartographer, a contemporary of Jacques-Nicolas Bellin and skilled engraver, spent most of his life in prison because of several debts, however, produced thousands of maps and its best-known work in 1758 was called the pocket atlas Atlas Minimus. He worked also for the Gentleman's Magazine for which engraved different decorative maps. He also published his own work in The Universal Magazine of Knowledge and Pleasure, The Universal Museum and The Universal Traveller.
