= Thames Magistrates' Court =

Magistrates' court in London, England

Coordinates: 51°31′38″N 0°01′25″W

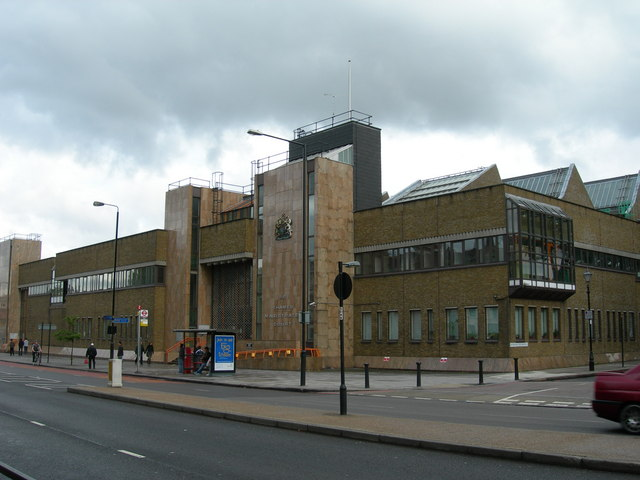

The Thames Magistrates' Court is a magistrates' court in Bow, London, England.

It is located near the Bow Road tube station

The Thames Magistrates' Court is part of His Majesty's Court System.
