= A12 road (England) =

Road in England

A12

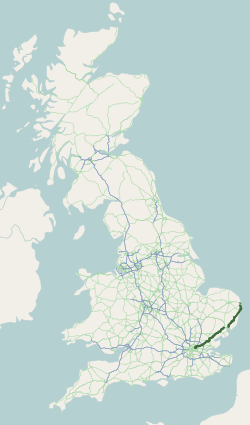

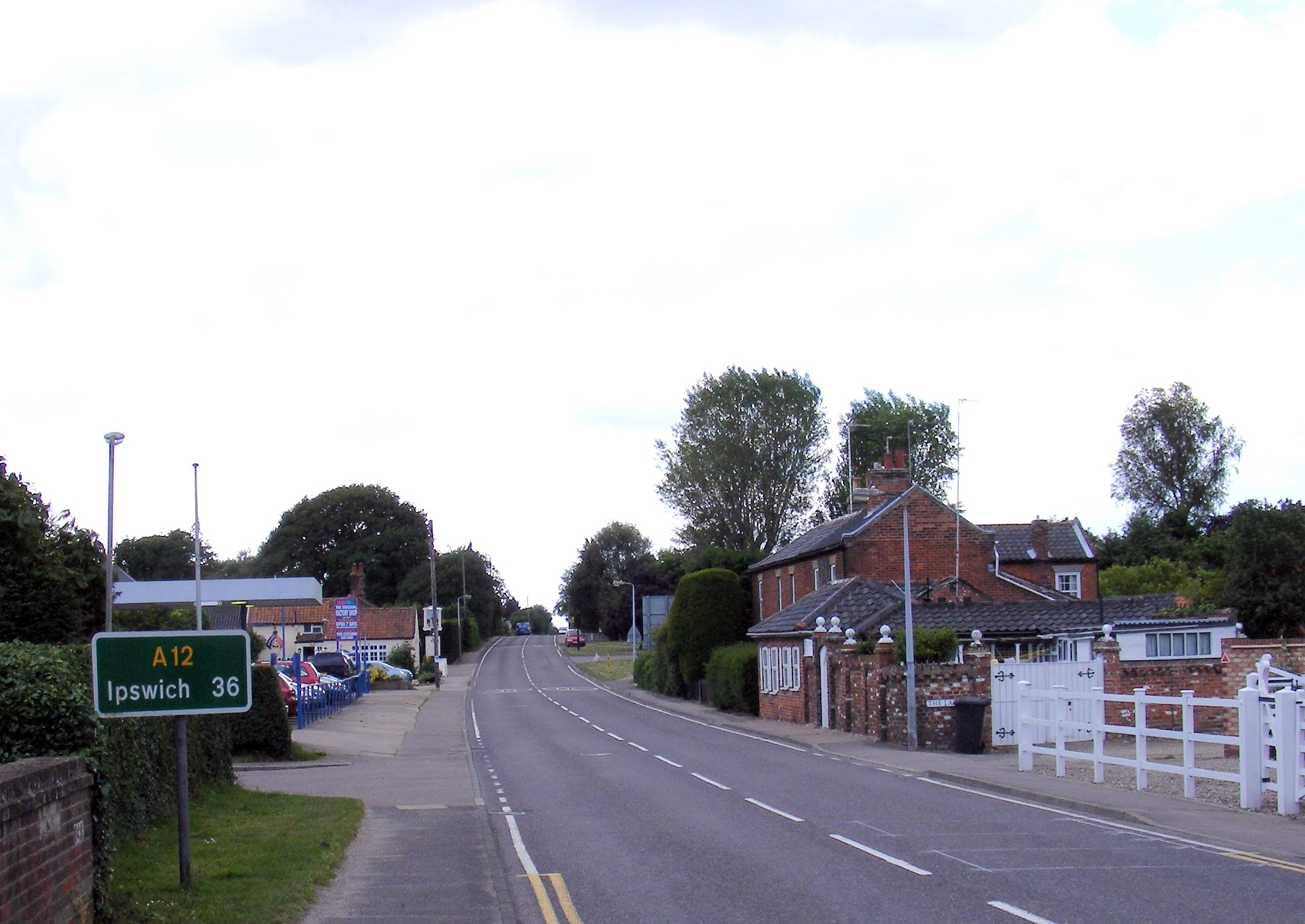
- The A12 at Wrentham, heading toward Ipswich

Route information
- Part of E30
- Length: 118.8 mi (191.2 km)

Major junctions
- South-West end: A102 / A13 in Poplar, London

- A11 near Stratford, London A406 in Ilford A127 in Romford M25 M11 near Brentwood Essex A414 in Margaretting A130 near Chelmsford A120 near Marks Tey A120 near Colchester; A14 near Ipswich A146 in Lowestoft
- North-East end: A47 in Lowestoft 52.508084°N 1.730146°E

Location
- Country: United Kingdom
- Constituent country: England
- Counties: Greater London, Essex, Suffolk
- Primary destinations: Stratford; Romford; Chelmsford; Colchester; Ipswich; Lowestoft

Road network
- Roads in the United Kingdom; Motorways; A and B road zones
| ← A11 | → A13 |

The A12 is a major road in Eastern England. It runs north-east/south-west between London and the coastal town of Lowestoft in the north-eastern corner of Suffolk, following a similar route to the Great Eastern Main Line until Ipswich. A section of the road between Lowestoft and Great Yarmouth became part of the A47 in 2017. Between the junctions with the M25 and the A14, the A12 forms part of the unsigned Euroroute E30 (prior to 1985, it was the E8). Unlike most A roads, this section of the A12, together with the A14 and the A55, has junction numbers as if it were a motorway. The 52 miles (84 km) section of the A12 through Essex has sections of dual two lanes and dual three lanes, with eight changes in width between the M25 to Ipswich. It was named as Britain's worst road because of "potholes and regular closures due to roadworks" in a 2007 survey by Cornhill Insurance. The A12 is covered by the National Highways A12 / A120 route based strategy.

Starting just north of the Blackwall Tunnel, where it connects end on to the A102, it heads north through Bow and Hackney Wick, then north-east through Leyton and Romford, then into Essex, passing Brentwood and Colchester. In Suffolk, it passes Ipswich and Saxmundham, then follows the coast through Lowestoft before entering Norfolk, passing through Gorleston-on-Sea and ending at Great Yarmouth. In February 2017, the route was renumbered between Great Yarmouth and Lowestoft to become the A47. In June 2024, most of the A1117 was renumbered as the A12, incorporating the Lowestoft Gull Wing Bridge, where the A12 now terminates at the A47 in North Lowestoft.

== History ==
The A12 was formed in 1922 as part of the Great Britain road numbering scheme, and initially the route went from Stratford to Gallows Corner along the present A118 road before continuing to Great Yarmouth. This section in London was rerouted to run on Eastern Avenue by the mid-1940s, and extended to follow the current route from Blackwall Tunnel along the East Cross Route, (previously the A102(M) & A106), the M11 link road in 1999.

The route from London to Essex has long been important, with Old Ford being the location of an ancient Celtic crossing of the River Lea. The route was altered slightly by the Romans who created a paved road from London to Colchester, which was part of Inter V on the Antonine Itinerary, and parts of this were used by a turnpike road, the Great Essex Road. The crossing of the Lea moved to its current location at Bow around 1110 when Matilda, wife of Henry I, ordered a distinctively bow-shaped, three-arched bridge to be built over the river. A map from 1766 shows a route from London to Lowestoft which follows much of the current A12.

The "Ipswich to South Town and Bungay Turnpike Trust" was established in 1785, operating between Ipswich and Great Yarmouth. The trust was wound up in 1872 following the arrival of the East Suffolk Line which was fully operational between the two towns in 1859. Following the demise of the Turnpike trust, responsibility reverted to parish councils until the new county councils took over in 1889.

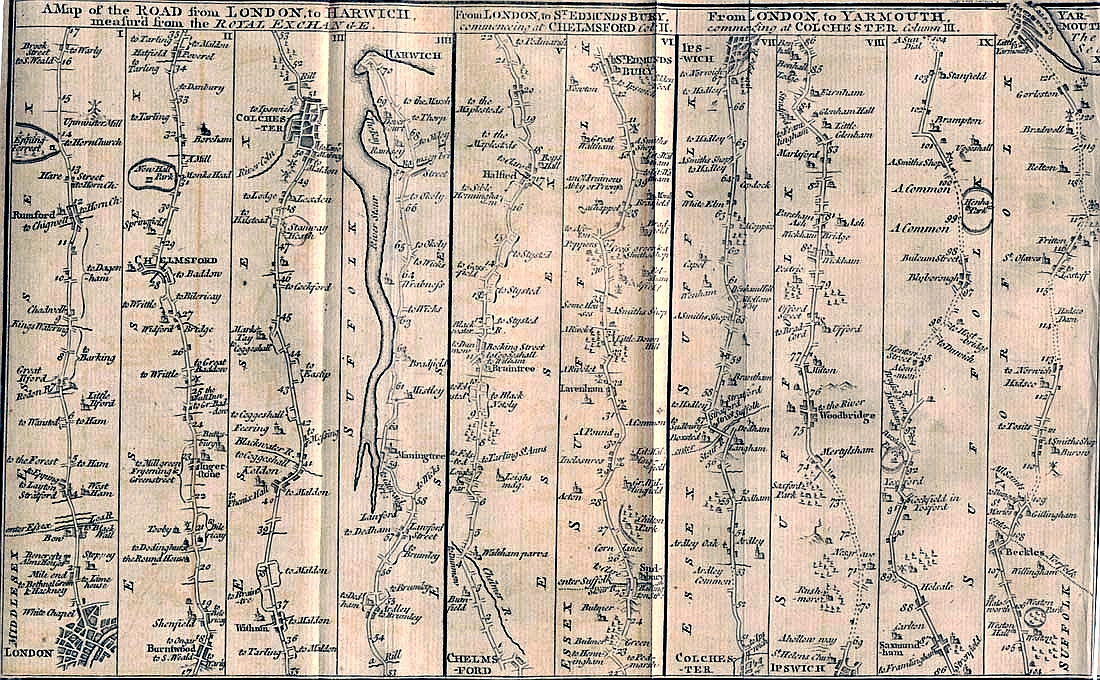
John Gibson's 1776 map of a road from London to Great Yarmouth. The original route of the A12 mostly ran on this alignment, particularly the Roman Road from London to Colchester.

A new section of the A12, known as the "M11 link road" or "A12 Hackney-M11 Link Road", was built in the early 1990s in the face of the major M11 link road protest and finally opened in October 1999. The section of road had originally been proposed in 1903 in a Royal Commission on London Traffic. A public inquiry had been held in September 1961 and a further three public inquiries, a Parliamentary Bill and a High Court challenge had been required before the work started.

Initiated in 2000, the London to Ipswich Multi-modal study reported its conclusions late in 2002.

In 2008 improvements were made to the junction between the A12 and the M25 to increase slip-road capacity, in particular for clockwise M25 traffic turning north onto the A12, and to ease congestion on the Brook Street Roundabout (serving the M25, A12 and local Brentwood traffic as the A1023).

The bascule bridge in Lowestoft was built in 1972, and was refurbished in spring 2008.

Essex County Council carried out its own inquiry into the road in 2008, with work on a £12.4m scheme for a new junction on the A12 at Cuckoo Farm, Colchester adjacent to the Colchester Community Stadium, subsequently starting in December 2009. It was promoted by Essex County Council who prepared plans in 2001 and was financed from the Community Infrastructure Fund. It opened on 16 December 2010.

The section of A12 between Brentwood and Ipswich is classed as a major trunk road, managed by Highways England. The section between Ipswich and Lowestoft was de-trunked in 2001, with control passing to Suffolk County Council. This section is primarily single carriageway.

In 2011, at Junction 33 (Copdock Interchange) the junction was widened and improved to ease the increasing traffic flow along the road. Works ended in 2012. A widening of the section from Chelmsford to the A120 junction near Colchester is proposed with a start date in 2023/2024 and expected to complete around 2028.

== Bypasses ==
Much of the original route has been bypassed around historic town centres such as Brentwood and Witham. In larger settlements such as Chelmsford, Colchester and Ipswich the original route has been bypassed twice.

The Eastern Avenue was built in the 1920s as a bypass for the section between Romford and Ilford, meeting what was the A11 at Leytonstone. It was numbered A106 until the 1930s when it became part of the A12.

The 5-mile (8 km) long Brentwood bypass was opened in November 1965.

A bypass for Chelmsford was first included in the roads programme in 1968. Draft orders for the southern bypass were published in 1974, however the public inquiry in 1975 suggested that the government should re-examine the appropriateness of a "central route" and the government delayed the road. In 1979 the government announced that it would proceed with the southern dual two lane route which opened in 1986.

The Wickham Market bypass opened in July 1976, providing a much needed improvement to avoid the narrow, one-lane wide section of road through Wickham Market.

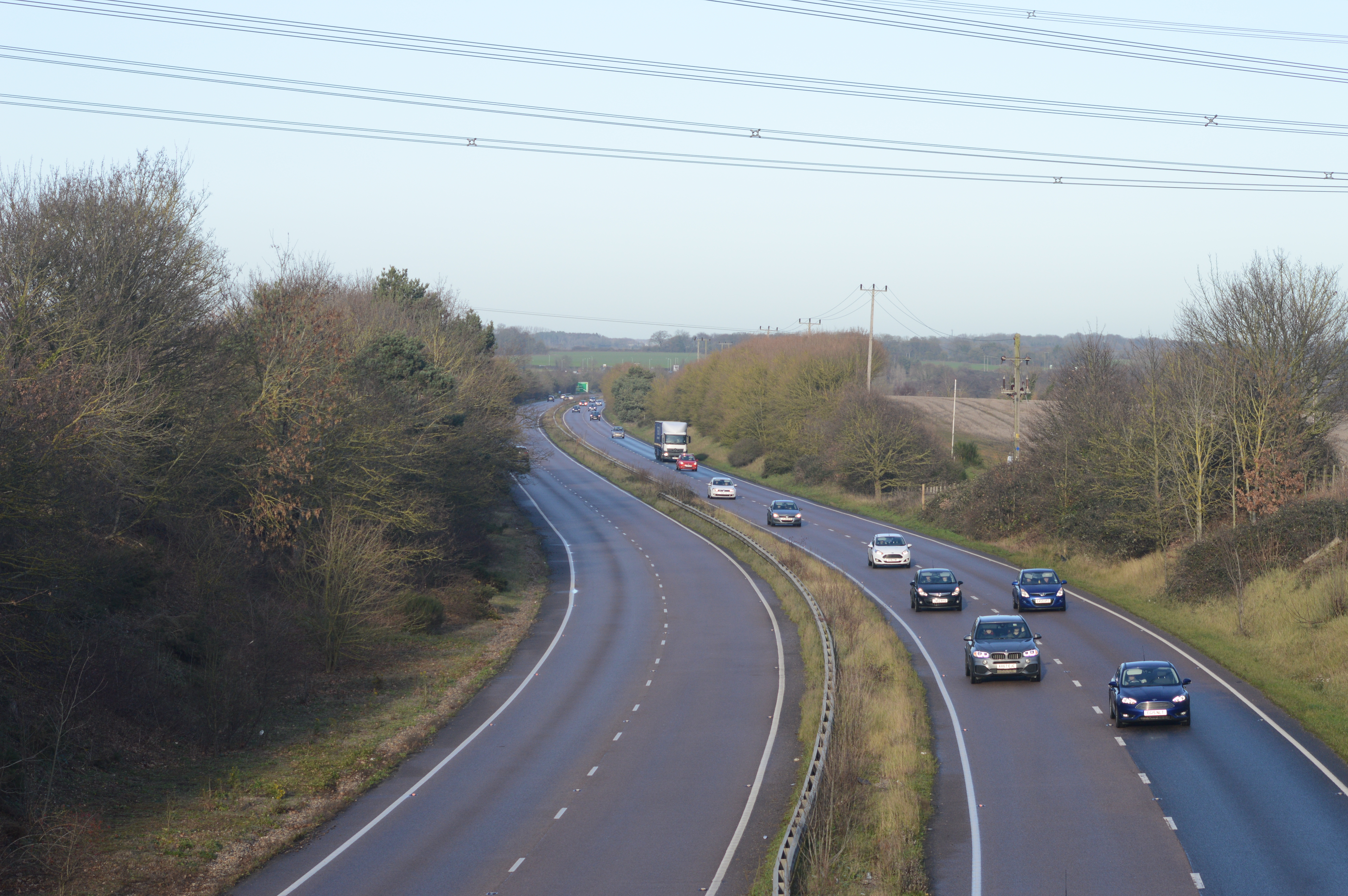
Wickham Market A12 Bypass

Ipswich's "Southern by-pass" via the Orwell Bridge was opened in 1982. This section, when first numbered, was part of the A45 and later designated as part of the A14.

The Martlesham bypass (previously known as the Kesgrave and Martlesham Bypass) was completed in 1987/1988 as was the Saxmundham bypass.

A white paper, Roads for Prosperity, published in 1989, proposed to widen the Chelmsford Bypass and the section from Hatfield Peverel to Witham to dual 3 lane; it also proposed widening the section from Saxmundham to Lowestoft and from Wickham Market to Farnham to dual 2 lanes. It also included a 'new route from the M25 to Chelmsford' as a dual two lane road following the proposed route of the M12 motorway.

The Department for Transport published Trunk roads, England, into the 1990s in May 1990 which included ten proposed developments for the A12 between the M25 and Lowestoft including the M12 motorway between M25 and the Chelmsford bypass, Chelmsford bypass widening and improvements on the sections from Hatfield Peverel to Marks Tey, Four Sisters to Stratford St. Mary, Martlesham to Wickham Market, Wickham Market to Saxmundham, the bypass around Saxmundham, Saxmundham to south of Wrentham, South of Wrentham to Kessingland and the Lowestoft relief road.

A public inquiry in the "Saxmundham to Wickham Market bypass" was held in 1995 but this road has not been built.

Between 1968 and 2024 Lowestoft has seen various new roads built to bypass and divert the A12 away from the historic residential streets along the coastline. In the 60s/70s Bloodmoor Roundabout / Bloodmoor Road was completed, paving the way for the new route of the A12 from the south. 1990 saw the construction of Peto Way, followed by Millennium Way in 1998 (the "Northern Relief Road") (formerly part of the A1117), however it wouldn't be until 2024 these were incorporated into the A12. In 2006, the 1.5 mile Tom Crisp Way "Southern Relief Road" opened, diverting the A12 away from the cliffs and built up Kirkely. 2015 saw Millennium Way extended to connect to the A47 at Corton and 2024 saw a new third river crossing built, the Gull Wing Bridge, which linked the northern and southern relief roads and completes the A12 bypass in Lowestoft. The entire bypass consists of single carriageway roads with modern cycle and pedestrian facilities and a mostly 40 MPH speed limit.

== M12 motorway ==
During the 1940s, there were plans for a motorway between South Woodford and Brentwood, initially dubbed Radial Route 7, which later became the M12 motorway in the 1960s. This would have run from the North Circular Road in London, at the base of the current M11 motorway, joining the A12 north of Brentwood. The North Circular was to be upgraded to motorway-standard as part of Ringway 2 and be designated as the M15 motorway. The M11 was to have provided a motorway standard road into central London past Ringway 1, terminating at the Angel in Islington. The M12 motorway was never built, although the junction of the M11 with the North Circular was designed to accommodate it.

The scheme was revived in the late 1980s, and extended the northern section to the A12 near Chelmsford. Plans for the M12 motorway were withdrawn in March 1994, following a review of the trunk roads programme.

== Route ==
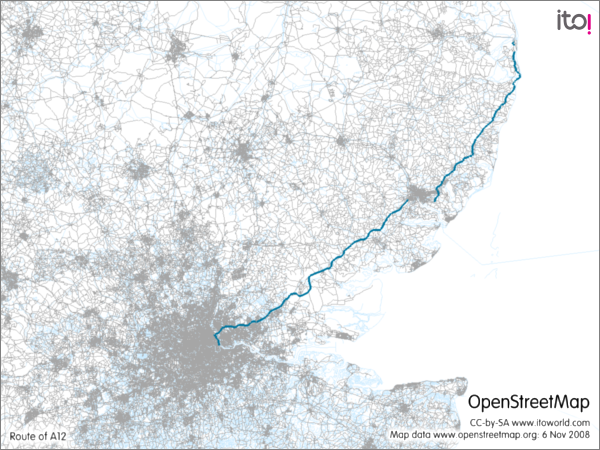
Route of A12 from OpenStreetMap

A12 (Numbered junctions)
Northbound exits
Junction
Southbound exits
Essex
M25, Brentwood A1023
11 (M25 J28 – Brook Street)
M25, Brentwood A1023
Brentwood A1023, Mountnessing B1002
12 (Mountnessing Marylands)
Brentwood A1023, Mountnessing B1002
No Exit
13 (Trueloves)
Ingatestone B1002
Margaretting
14 (Furze Hill)
No Exit
Chelmsford A414, Margaretting B1002
15 (Webb's Farm)
Chelmsford A414, Margaretting B1002
B1007
16 (Stock Road)
B1007
A130, Chelmsford A1114
17 (Howe Green)
A130, Chelmsford A1114
A414
18 (Sandon)
A414
Stansted Airport, Sudbury, Braintree A130 (A131)
19 (Boreham)
Sudbury (A131) Chelmsford A138
Hatfield Peverel
20a (Hatfield Peverel South)
No Exit
No Exit
20b (Hatfield Peverel North)
Hatfield Peverel
Witham B1389
21 (Lynfield Motors)
No Exit
Witham B1389
22 (Coleman's)
Witham B1389
Kelvedon B1024
23 (Kelvedon South)
No Exit
No Exit
24 (Kelvedon North)
Kelvedon B1024
Braintree, Stansted A120, B1408
25 (Marks Tey)
Braintree, Stansted A120, B1408
A1124
26 (Colchester West)
A1124
Colchester A133
27 (Colchester Central)
No Exit
Colchester (North)
28 (Colchester North)
Colchester (North)
Harwich, Clacton A120, Colchester A1232
29 (Ardleigh Crown)
Harwich, Clacton A120, Colchester A1232
Suffolk
B1029
30 (Park Lane Birchwood)
B1029
East Bergholt
31
East Bergholt
Capel St. Mary
32a (Capel St. Mary South)
Capel St. Mary
C475 London Road
32b (Bentley Longwood)
C475 London Road
London, Ipswich A14, A1214
33 (A14 J55 – Copdock Mill)
End of concurrency with A14

Road signposted as A14 to A14 J58 & As A12 to Lowestoft

=== London ===
The A12 starts just north of the Blackwall Tunnel at a junction with the A102 and the A13. From here to past Ipswich (including the entire section through London) the road is a dual carriageway. North of the junction, the A12 heads northwards as a 2/3 lane dual carriageway mostly at street level. This stretch of road is known as the Blackwall Tunnel Northern Approach. This stretch ends at the triple-layer interchange with the A11 at Bow Road where it becomes the East Cross Route. This is mainly a 3/4 lane dual carriageway built mainly on flyovers and underpasses and was built in the late 1960s, previously called the A102(M). The road turns North Eastwards at the unfinished Hackney Wick Interchange where the carriageways split and the northbound carriageway has a right hand entrance. When the London Ringways plan was being proposed, a motorway (North Cross Route) was to end here and the M11 was meant to extend from its current terminus on the A406 through this junction and to Angel. The A12 heads to Lea. The section from the Lea Interchange to Leytonstone, also known as the M11 Link road, was built in the 1990s in the face of a major road protest. During this work the old section as far as Wanstead was rebuilt as a dual carriageway. Prior to that, the A12 started at the Green Man Roundabout at Leytonstone, and was single carriageway west of Wanstead Underground station. It now has an underpass at that roundabout, which again is a junction with the old A11. East of Wanstead, the A12 runs roughly due east. It is known as Eastern Avenue, then Eastern Avenue West and Eastern Avenue East, built in the 1920s as a bypass for the section of the Roman road from Colchester to London running through Ilford and Romford (today's A118). The eastern end of the Eastern Avenue is Gallows Corner in the London Borough of Havering, just east of Romford. The junction also marks the start-point of the A127 Southend Arterial Road, also 1920s vintage. At the roundabout, an extemporised two-lane flyover still provides priority for A12 eastbound to A127 traffic (and vice versa). However, the A12 now veers roughly north-eastward, because it starts to follow the course of the Roman road; the Romans started building this road from Colchester, their original capital for the province. However, the 2.5-mile (4.0 km) stretch from Gallows Corner to the junction with the M25 motorway, called Colchester Road, is still perfectly straight. The M25 junction is number 28; it also marks where the A12 crosses the boundary from London to Essex.

=== Essex ===
Originally, the A12 followed the route of the Roman road closely and so was fairly straight, but there are now several town bypasses, so the road through Essex now has several meanders. The A12 formerly went through Brentwood, Mountnessing, Ingatestone, Margaretting, Chelmsford, Boreham, Hatfield Peverel, Witham, Kelvedon, Copford, Stanway and Colchester, but these are all now bypassed, and the A12 is a dual carriageway with mostly grade-separated junctions for its whole length in Essex.

It is this stretch of the A12, particularly between Chelmsford and Colchester, which has led to the poor reputation for surface quality of the A12. This is mainly for its bumpy or potholed surface, mostly due to worn concrete surfaces. In an ongoing process these sections are being relaid with tarmac, however some sections including the Kelvedon bypass, and between Copford and Stanway have yet to be resurfaced.

Built in 1982, the A12 Colchester bypass provides an uninterrupted dual carriageway where the national speed limit of 70 mph applies. Before 1982, the A12 took a route much closer to Colchester itself, and although still a bypass it consisted of urban single carriageways with roundabouts and pedestrian crossings. The old bypass is still in existence – the western half now forms part of the A1124 and the eastern half part of the A133.

=== Suffolk ===
The Suffolk stretch of the A12 starts with the Capel St Mary bypass. Originally the route from the Northern end of this bypass ran through the villages of Washbrook and Copdock and into Ipswich. When Ipswich's Southern by-pass was built in the early 1980s, the route picked up from the northern Capel St Mary junction (now numbered 32b), to pass to the West of the original line – this allowed the relevant ground works and interchanges to be completed with minimal traffic disruption. The old dual carriageway through Washbrook and Copdock is blocked off at White's Corner and was renumbered to be the C475. A footpath still exists which enables passage underneath the A14.

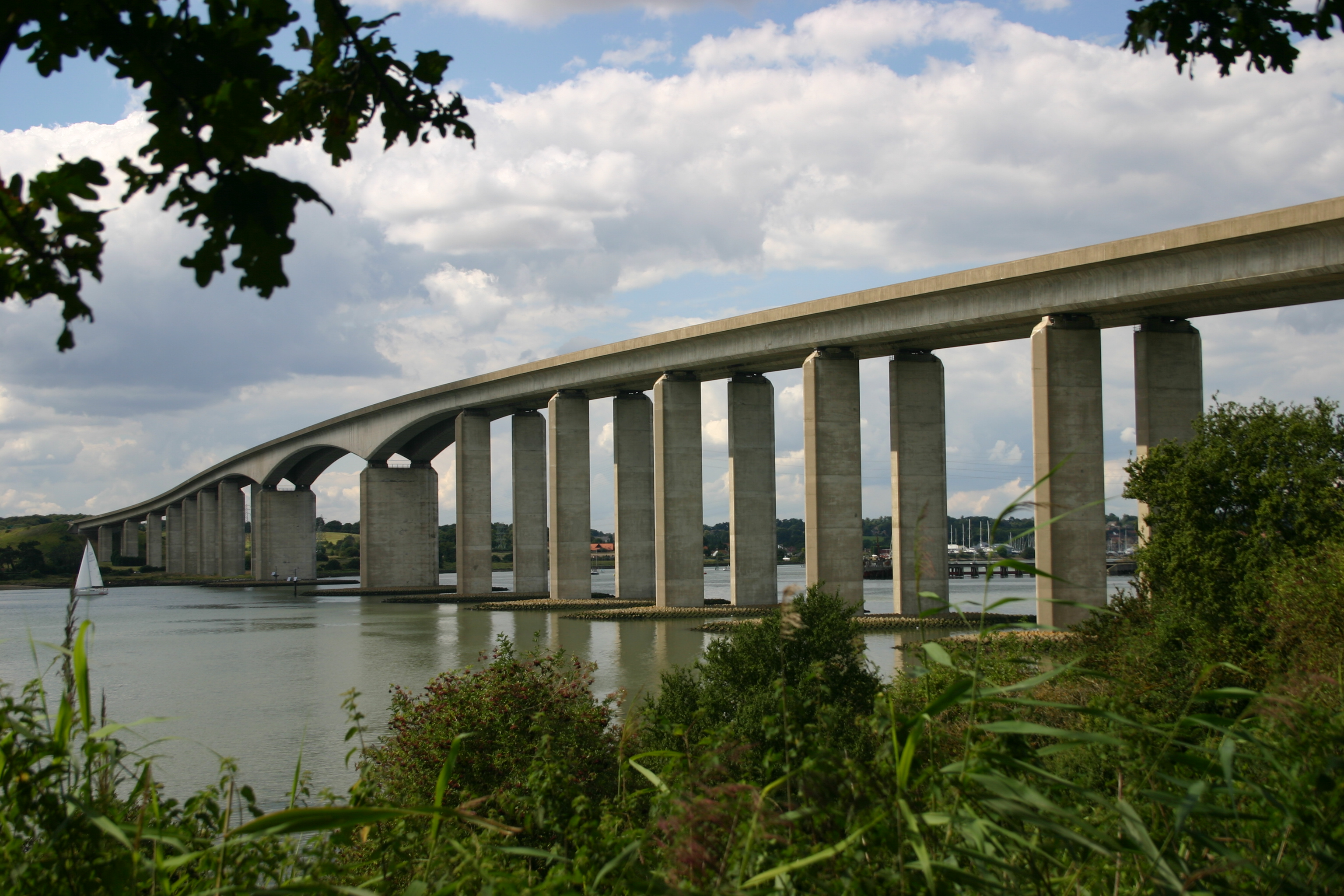
The A12 (multiplexed with the A14) passes over the Orwell Bridge south of Ipswich

The old route through Ipswich was renumbered as the A1214 following construction of the Ipswich Southern By-pass. The old route is more locally known by the road names, notably "London Road" to the Town Centre and Woodbridge Road out the other side. The Ipswich Southern By-pass allows the A12 to overlap the A14 to Seven Hills Interchange, 7 miles (11 km) from the Copdock junction, where the A12 reappears and heads North. As the A14 the road passes over the large Orwell Bridge with total length of 1,287 metres. This has a summit at 43 metres above the river giving a humped feel with reduced visibility for traffic. There are at-grade roundabout junctions past BT Adastral Park at Martlesham and around the Woodbridge bypass.

For most of its remaining length through Suffolk the A12 is a mostly single carriageway road, and in many places its speed limit is less than the national limit, for example as it passes through towns and villages. During 2003/2004 some of these speed restrictions were further reduced from 40 mph (64 km/h) to 30 mph (48 km/h). There are, though, a few stretches of dual carriageway between the Woodbridge bypass and Lowestoft (at Wickham Market, Saxmundham, Wangford and Kessingland). This section of the A12 was detrunked in 2001 as part of the Highways Agency's streamlining of its Trunk Road Network. Control was therefore passed to the local authorities. Just south of Blythburgh, the old milestone shows it is 100 miles (160 km) to London.

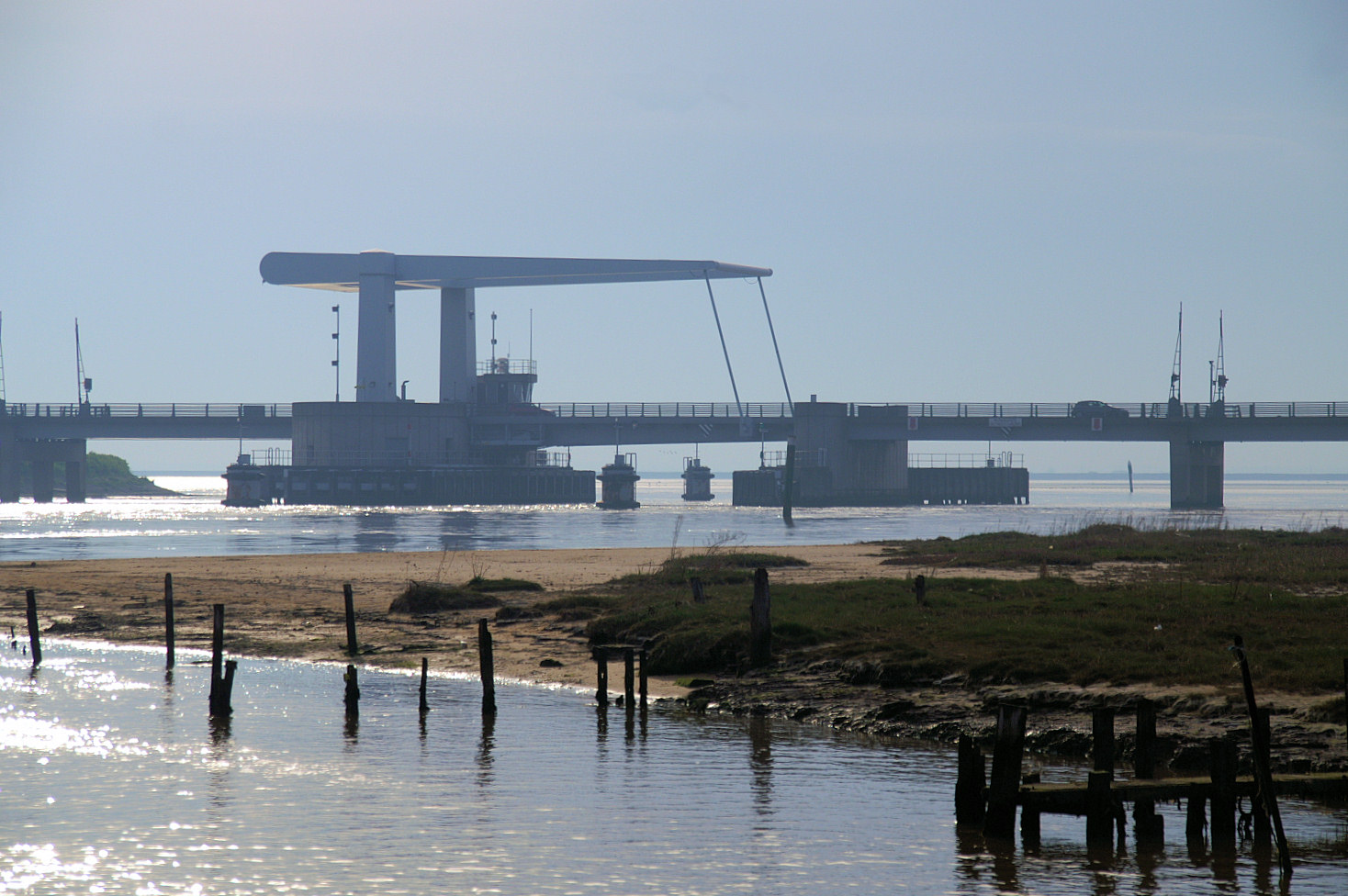
The A47 passes over Breydon Bridge to the west of Great Yarmouth, close to where the A47 and A12 originally met.

The A12 ran through Lowestoft for about 5 miles (8 km) on urban 30 mph (48 km/h) limited roads. However, as of June 2006, the A12 now follows the course of the new single carriageway 40 miles per hour (64 km/h) Southern Relief Road that joins the A47 at Lowestoft Bascule Bridge. In June 2024, a small segment of the B1531 was renumbered the A12 and upgraded with a new roundabout junction and 50m of dual carriageway. The A12 is now carried over the river by a new third river crossing, the Gull Wing Bridge, where it meets the former A1117 which was renumbered as the A12. This carries the A12 via the towns Northern Relief Roads to the A47 near to Corton, where the A12 terminates.

=== Norfolk ===
From February 2017, the A12 no longer reaches Norfolk as it terminates in Lowestoft at 52°28′26″N 1°45′02″E. Before February 2017, From a point just south west of the mouth of the River Yare, northwards to the point where it crosses the River Yare in Great Yarmouth, the A12 followed the route originally used by the railway line from Lowestoft to its terminus north of Breydon Bridge at Vauxhall Roundabout where the A47 previously terminated.

== Junction list ==
| County | Location | mi | km | Jct | Destinations | Notes |
|---|---|---|---|---|---|---|
| Greater London | Tower Hamlets | 0.0 | 0.0 | | A13 / A102 (Blackwall Tunnel) to A20 – Docklands, Lewisham | South-western terminus; continues as A102 beyond A13 |
| Greater London | Tower Hamlets | 0.7 | 1.1 | Begin freeway | | |
| Greater London | Tower Hamlets | 0.7 | 1.1 | | Devas Street | North-east exit and entrance |
| Greater London | Tower Hamlets | 0.7 | 1.1 | | Gillender Street / Twelvetrees | South-west exit only |
| Greater London | Tower Hamlets | 0.9 | 1.4 | | St Leonards Street | North-east exit only |
| Greater London | Tower Hamlets | 1.0– 1.3 | 1.6– 2.1 | | A11 west / A118 east – Central London, Mile End, Bow, Stratford | |
| Greater London | Tower Hamlets | 1.5– 1.8 | 2.4– 2.9 | | B142 – Old Ford | |
| Greater London | Hackney | 2.2– 2.7 | 3.5– 4.3 | | A106 – Dalston, Hackney, Clapton | No southwest exit |
| Greater London | Hackney—Newham borough boundary | 3.1– 3.5 | 5.0– 5.6 | | A106 – Leyton, Dalston, Hackney, Stratford | Leyton signed north-east only, other destinations south-west only |
| Greater London | Waltham Forest—Redbridge borough boundary | 5.4– 5.9 | 8.7– 9.5 | | A114 / A113 – Walthamstow, Leytonstone, Wanstead, Leyton | A113 and Wanstead signed north-east only, Leyton south-west only |
| Greater London | Redbridge | 6.5 | 10.5 | | Wanstead | South-west exit and north-east entrance only |
| Greater London | Redbridge | 6.9 | 11.1 | End freeway | | |
| Greater London | Redbridge | 6.9– 7.1 | 11.1– 11.4 | | A406 (North Circular Road) to M11 / A10 / A1 / A13 – Stansted Airport, Docklands | A406 junction 4 |
| Greater London | Redbridge | 8.0 | 12.9 | | A1400 north-west (Woodford Avenue) / A123 (Cranbrook Road) – Woodford, Ilford, Hainault, Barkingside | South-eastern terminus of A1400 |
| Greater London | Barking and Dagenham | 11.4 | 18.3 | | A1112 (Whaleborne Lane North) – Dagenham, Marks Gate, Hainault, Becontree Heath, Chadwell Heath | |
| Greater London | Havering | 12.9 | 20.8 | | A125 south (North Street) / B175 (Havering Road) – Romford, Collier Row, Hornchurch, Havering-atte-Bower, Ongar | Hornchurch, Havering-atte-Bower, and Ongar signed north-east only |
| Greater London | Havering | 14.9 | 24.0 | | A127 (Southend Arterial Road) / A118 (Main Road) to Straight Road / M25 – Southend, Dartford Crossing, Gidea Park, Havering-atte-Bower, Noak Hill, Hornchurch, Harold Wood | Eastern terminus of A118 |
| Greater London—Essex boundary | Havering—Brentwood boundary | 16.9 | 27.2 | Begin freeway | | |
| Greater London—Essex boundary | Havering—Brentwood boundary | 16.9– 17.6 | 27.2– 28.3 | 11 | M25 / A1023 to M11 – Stansted Airport, Dartford Crossing, Brentwood | South-western terminus of A1023; M25 junction 28 |
| Essex | Brentwood—Mountnessing boundary | 21.5– 22.1 | 34.6– 35.6 | 12 | A1023 south-west / B1002 – Brentwood, Ingatestone, Mountnessing | B1002, Ingatestone, and Mountnessing signed south-west only |
| Essex | Heybridge | 22.7– 24.0 | 36.5– 38.6 | 13 | B1002 – Ingatestone | No north-east exit |
| Essex | Margaretting | 26.1 | 42.0 | 14 | B1002 – Margaretting | North-east exit and south-west entrance |
| Essex | Margaretting | 26.8– 27.2 | 43.1– 43.8 | 15 | A414 west / B1002 – Harlow, Chelmsford, Margaretting | B1002 and Margaretting signed south-west only; south-western terminus of A414 concurrency |
| Essex | Galleywood | 28.7– 29.0 | 46.2– 46.7 | 16 | B1007 – Galleywood, Billericay | |
| Essex | Galleywood—Great Baddow village boundary | 31.2– 31.5 | 50.2– 50.7 | 17 | A130 south / A1114 north-west – Southend, Basildon, Chelmsford | South-western terminus of A130 concurrency; south-eastern terminus of A1114 |
| Essex | Sandon | 32.5– 33.0 | 52.3– 53.1 | 18 | A414 east – Maldon | North-eastern terminus of A414 concurrency |
| Essex | Chelmsford—Boreham boundary | 35.0– 35.7 | 56.3– 57.5 | | A131 north to A138 – Stansted Airport, Chelmsford, Braintree, Sudbury | Braintree signed north-east only, To A138 and Sudbury south-west only; north-eastern terminus of A414 concurrency |
| Essex | Hatfield Peverel | 37.9– 38.2 | 61.0– 61.5 | 20A | B1137 – Hatfield Peverel | North-east exit and south-west entrance |
| Essex | Hatfield Peverel | 39.1 | 62.9 | 20B | B1137 – Hatfield Peverel | South-west exit and north-east entrance |
| Essex | Hatfield Peverel— Witham boundary | 39.7– 40.0 | 63.9– 64.4 | 21 | B1389 – Witham | No south-west exit |
| Essex | Witham | 42.5– 42.7 | 68.4– 68.7 | 22 | B1389 to B1018 – Witham, Maldon | |
| Essex | Rivenhall End | 43.3 | 69.7 | | Great Braxted, Silver End, Rivenhall | Rivenhall signed north-east only |
| Essex | Kelvedon | 44.2 | 71.1 | 23 | B1024 to B1023 – Kelvedon, Tiptree | North-east exit and south-west entrance |
| Essex | Feering | 47.1 | 75.8 | 24 | B1024 to B1023 – Kelvedon, Tiptree | South-west exit and north-east entrance |
| Essex | Marks Tey | 49.9– 50.8 | 80.3– 81.8 | 25 | A120 west – Marks Tey, Stansted Airport | South-western terminus of A120 concurrency |
| Essex | Stanway | 52.2– 52.6 | 84.0– 84.7 | 26 | A1124 – Halstead, Stanway | |
| Essex | Colchester | 53.2– 53.5 | 85.6– 86.1 | 27 | A133 – Colchester | North-east exit and south-west entrance |
| Essex | Colchester | 56.4– 56.8 | 90.8– 91.4 | 28 | A134 – Sudbury, Colchester | |
| Essex | Colchester—Langham boundary | 57.5– 58.4 | 92.5– 94.0 | 29 | A120 east to A1232 – Colchester North, Clacton, Harwich | North-eastern terminus of A120 concurrency |
| Essex | Langham—Dedham boundary | 59.4 | 95.6 | | Ardleigh, Langham | North-east exit and entrance |
| Essex | Langham—Dedham boundary | 59.7 | 96.1 | | Ardleigh, Langham | South-west exit and entrance |
| Essex | Langham—Dedham boundary | 60.1– 60.3 | 96.7– 97.0 | | Stratford St. Mary, Dedham, Higham | North-east exit and south-west entrance |
| Suffolk | Stratford St. Mary | 61.9– 62.2 | 99.6– 100.1 | 30 | B1029 – Dedham, Stratford St. Mary | |
| Suffolk | Holton St Mary— East Bergholt boundary | 63.6 | 102.4 | 31 | B1070 – Hadleigh, Flatford, Raydon, Holton St Mary | Flatford, Raydon, and Holton St Mary signed north-east only |
| Suffolk | Capel St. Mary— Bentley boundary | 65.8– 66.2 | 105.9– 106.5 | | Capel St. Mary, Bentley | Destinations signed south-west only |
| Suffolk | Copdock and Washbrook— Bentley boundary | 66.7– 67.3 | 107.3– 108.3 | 32B | Washbrook, Copdock | |
| Suffolk | | 68.9 | 110.9 | End freeway | | |
| Suffolk | | 68.9– 69.4 | 110.9– 111.7 | | A14 west / A1214 east to A140 – Bury St Edmunds, Ipswich, Norwich | The Midlands signed south-west only; junction on A14; south-western terminus of A14 concurrency; western terminus of A1214 |
| Suffolk | Wherstead | 70.7– 71.2 | 113.8– 114.6 | 56 | A137 – Ipswich, Manningtree, Brantham | |
| Suffolk | Wherstead—Ipswich boundary | 71.7– 72.5 | 115.4– 116.7 | Orwell Bridge over River Orwell | | |
| Suffolk | Ipswich | 73.8– 74.2 | 118.8– 119.4 | 57 | A1189 – Ipswich, Nacton | |
| Suffolk | | 75.8– 76.0 | 122.0– 122.3 | | A14 east / A1156 north-west – Felixstowe, Ipswich, Bucklesham, Levington | North-eastern terminus of A14 concurrency; south-eastern terminus of A1156 |
| Suffolk | Martlesham | 79.5 | 127.9 | | A1214 west / Main Road – Ipswich, Martlesham, Little Bealings, Kesgrave | Eastern terminus of A1214 |
| Suffolk | Melton | 82.8 | 133.3 | | A1152 east (Woods Lane) – Orford, Rendlesham, Woodbridge, Suffolk, Melton | Western terminus of A1152 |
| Suffolk | Ufford | 84.7 | 136.3 | | B1438 – Melton, Ufford | Grade-separated junction; south-west exit and entrance |
| Suffolk | Pettistree | 85.7– 86.2 | 137.9– 138.7 | | Pettistree, Ufford, Wickham Market | Grade-separated junction; north-east exit and entrance |
| Suffolk | Hacheston | 87.9– 88.3 | 141.5– 142.1 | | B1116 / B1078 – Framlingham, Wickham Market, Orford, Hacheston, Campsea Ashe | Grade-separated junction |
| Suffolk | Benhall | 92.8 | 149.3 | | A1094 east to B1069 – Aldeburgh, Leiston, Snape | To B1069 and Leiston signed north-east only, Snape south-west only; western terminus of A1094 |
| Suffolk | Yoxford | 98.5 | 158.5 | | High Street (A1120 west) – Yoxford village centre, Sibton, Peasenhall, Framlingham | Framlingham signed north-east only; eastern terminus of A1120 |
| Suffolk | Darsham—Thorington boundary | 100.7 | 162.1 | | A144 north – Halesworth, Bungay | Southern terminus of A144 |
| Suffolk | Blythburgh | 104.6 | 168.3 | | A145 north to B1123 – Beccles, Halesworth | Southern terminus of A145 |
| Suffolk | Blythburgh | 104.9 | 168.8 | | A1095 east (Halesworth Road) – Southwold, Reydon | Western terminus of A1095 |
| Suffolk | Lowestoft | 115.9 | 186.5 | | A1117 north (Elm Tree Road) / A1145 west (Castleton Avenue) / Stradbroke Road (B1384) / Ribblesdale to A47 / A146 – Great Yarmouth, Beccles, Oulton, Oulton Broad, Carlton Colville | Southern terminus of A1117; eastern terminus of A1145 |
| Suffolk | Lowestoft | 118.2 | 190.2 | | A47 north (Waveney Road) – Great Yarmouth | Southern terminus of A47 |
| Suffolk | Lowestoft | 118.8 | 191.2 | | A1144 (St. Peter's Street) to A47 / B1074 – Beccles, Great Yarmouth, Somerleyton | North-eastern terminus |
1.000 mi = 1.609 km; 1.000 km = 0.621 mi: Incomplete access

== Proposed Improvements ==
=== 2008 Technology Upgrades ===
In November 2008 the government announced a £60 million technology package including variable message signs, CCTV, Automatic Number Plate Recognition cameras and automatic incident detection sensors embedded in the road surface to improve journey reliability, reduce delays and give better information to drivers. Work is due to start in 2011/12.

=== 1986 Proposed Bypasses ===
A bypass for various villages was proposed in 1986 as part of the government's 1989 Roads for Prosperity white paper which detailed many road schemes across the country. Suffolk county council considered a bypass for the villages of Farnham, Stratford St Andrew, Glemham and Marlesford for the 2006 Local Transport Plan. The scheme will not be implemented until after 2016. Essex county council has put forwards plans for a bypass of Chelmsford connecting Junction 19 of the A12 to the A131. Plans to upgrade additional sections of the A120 into a dual two-lane carriageway were scrapped in 2009.

== 2008 inquiry ==
In response to this increasing congestion, Essex County Council announced it would hold an A12 inquiry which was tasked with deciding how to improve the A12 and prevent the congestion. The inquiry was headed by Sir David Rowlands, KCB, a former Permanent Secretary at the Department for Transport, with professor Stephen Glaister, David Quarmby and Lord Whitty, all with significant knowledge of the transport sector.

The inquiry began taking submissions in April 2008. The Inquiry, the first ever local council sponsored inquiry into a major trunk road, heard from 24 organisations and 36 witnesses over three days including Department for Transport and Highways Agency officials, MPs, local and regional agencies and authorities, the emergency services, business and motoring groups. Comments were also received from over two hundred members of the public and through a petition organised by the Essex Chronicle newspaper. The commissions finding were published in July 2008 and its outline recommendations are:

- the A12 as far as Ipswich should be brought up to modern dual 2-lane standards (where not already dual-3), with urgent priority given to the Hatfield Peverel – Marks Tey section
- substandard lay-bys should be replaced; one or more locations off but near the A12 should be identified for secure HGV parking, and an HGV overtaking ban should be trialled
- a wide range of short term practical measures should be introduced to improve safety and reduce driver stress, such as selective speed limits and better information for drivers, and to improve the recovery from incidents and closures
- a New Route Management Strategy should be drawn up by the Highways Agency, in collaboration with local stakeholders, and an 'A12 Alliance' should be formed to consolidate and sustain the momentum for improvement
