= Aito =

Aito or AITO may refer to:

== People ==
- Aito Mäkinen (1927–2017), Finnish film director, screenwriter, and producer
- Aíto García Reneses (born 1946), Spanish former professional basketball coach and player

== Other uses ==
- Aitō, Shiga, Japan, a former town
- Aito, Tampere, Finland, a district
- Conus aito, a species of cone snail
- Association of Independent Tour Operators (AITO), a British travel industry trade group
- AITO (marque) a Chinese electric car brand
- Association Internationale pour les Technologies Objets a non-profit computer science association
