= Swain Destinations =

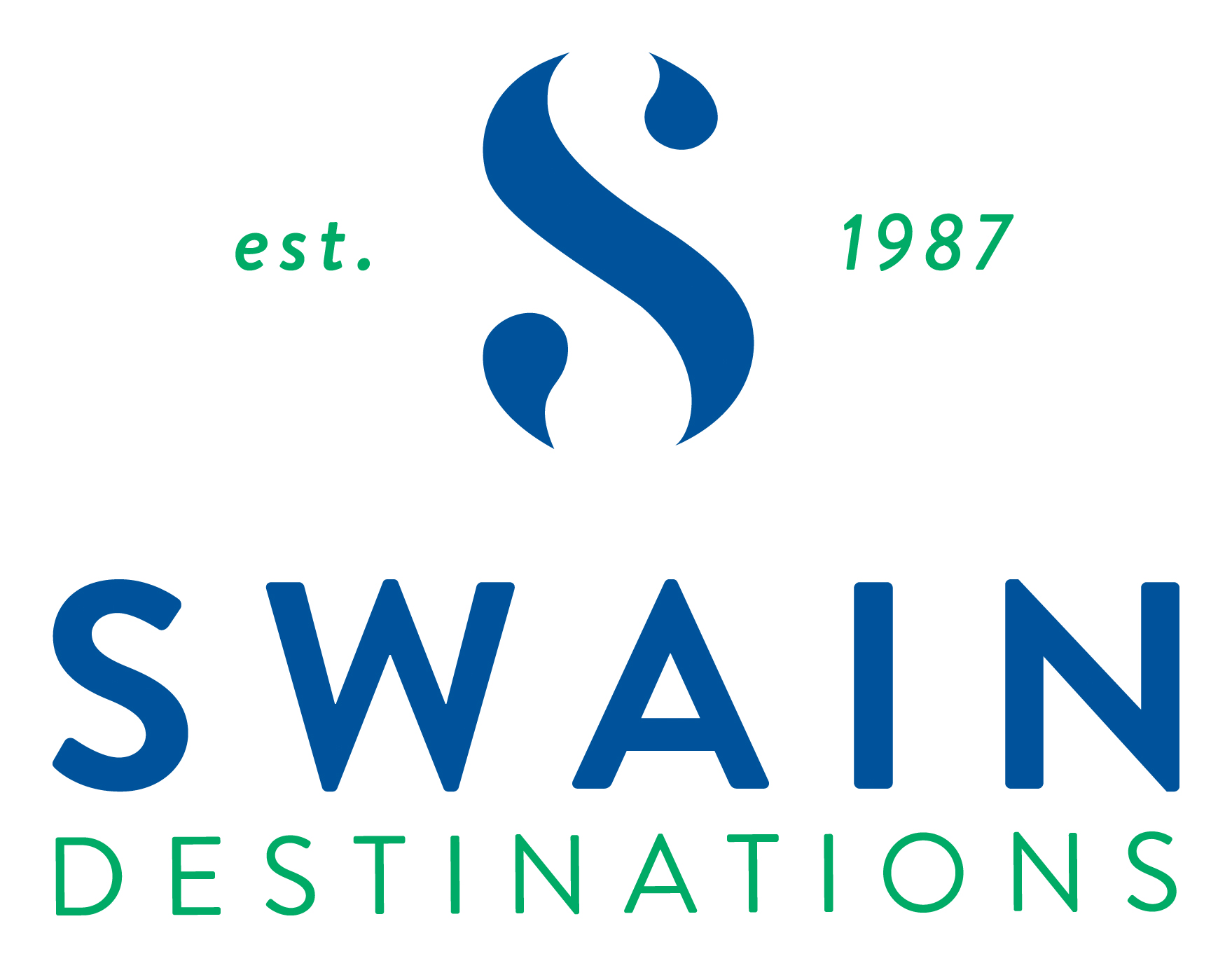
- Industry: Travel
- Founded: 1987
- Founder: Ian Swain and Linda Swain
- Headquarters: Ardmore, Pennsylvania
- Website: http://www.swaindestinations.com/

Swain Destinations is a travel company that was established in the United States 1987.

== History ==
Swain Destinations was founded in 1987 as Swain Tours by Australian native Ian Swain and his wife, Linda Swain, a native of the United States. The company first began selling outbound travel from the United States to Australia and New Zealand.

The company then extended its destinations to include South East Asia and Southern and Eastern Africa. In 1997, Africa and Asia were added to its travel product line. Swain Tours then began to rebrand its services from escorted touring to customized travel.

In 1999, Ian Swain sold Swain Tours to Far & Wide Travel, but continued to run it as part of the management team of Far & Wide. Although Swain Tours remained profitable during this four-year relationship, Far & Wide filed for bankruptcy in September 2003.

During this time, Ian Swain entered negotiations to buy back Swain Tours, but was outbid by Travel Corp. for the sum of $3 million. In 2006, Ian Swain bought Swain Tours from Travel Corp for an undisclosed amount. Swain Tours has been family owned and operated since that time.

In January 2014, Swain Tours relaunched as Swain Destinations, and focused on independent and customized travel.

In April 2026, founder Ian Swain sold the company to his son, Ian Swain II, for an undisclosed amount. Ian Swain II became President and Owner, while his father remained with the company to support the transition.

Swain Destinations is a member of the United States Tour Operators Association (USTOA), the Virtuoso luxury travel network, and the Signature Travel Network, affiliated with American Express Travel.

== Awards ==
South Australian Tourism Commission, Tour Wholesaler of the Year 2009, 2012
