= Jacada Travel =

British travel company

- Type: Private
- Industry: Travel and tourism
- Founded: 2008
- Founder: Alex Malcolm
- Headquarters: London, United Kingdom
- Area served: Africa, Asia, Latin America
- Parent: Wilderness
- Website: www.jacadatravel.com

Jacada Travel is a UK-based tour operator that arranges privately guided trips in Africa, Asia and Latin America. The company was founded in 2008 by Alex Malcolm and is based in Shoreditch, London, with additional offices in Hong Kong and Cape Town. During the COVID-19 pandemic, Jacada entered administration and was acquired by Wilderness in 2020. Since the relaunch, the company has operated as part of the Wilderness group with a focus on responsible and sustainable tourism.

== History ==
Jacada Travel began in 2008 when founder Alex Malcolm started organising private tours in Brazil. The business expanded to other parts of South America and later into Africa and Asia. Offices were then established in Hong Kong in 2015 and Cape Town in 2016 to support this growth.

In 2020, during the COVID-19 pandemic, Jacada entered administration and was bought by Wilderness Safaris (now Wilderness). The acquisition brought the brand under the Wilderness portfolio of travel companies and led to its relaunch later that year.

Malcolm has been profiled in several lifestyle publications, including Tatler Asia’s "How I Travel" series in 2017 and an interview in Lifestyle Asia (2020) about responsible travel.

== Sustainability initiatives ==
Since 2020, Jacada has focused its operations around sustainable and responsible tourism. In 2023, it introduced a Positive Impact Coordinator role to develop environmental and community programmes and, in 2024, Jacada launched the "Positive Impact Collection", a set of itineraries highlighting projects related to environmental protection, animal welfare and child safeguarding.

=== Industry commitments ===
Jacada has signed several international sustainability pledges, including:

- World Animal Protection’s Wildlife-Friendly Pledge
- the Glasgow Declaration on Climate Action in Tourism

It is also a member of the Latin American Travel Association (LATA) and appears in the Conscious Travel Foundation’s membership directory.

== Recognition ==
=== Awards and rankings ===
Jacada Travel has been included in a number of travel industry lists and award nominations:

- Travel + Leisure – ranked eighth in the 2024 "Readers' 15 Favourite Tour Operators" survey, with a score of 97.24
- Condé Nast Traveller – listed among the magazine’s "Top 50 Travel Specialists" in 2024 and 2025
- Condé Nast Traveller – included in the 2025 "Readers’ Choice Awards" for tour operators
- Travel + Leisure – featured on the publication’s "A-List" for 2024
- World Travel Awards – nominated for Europe’s Leading Luxury Tour Operator in 2022, 2023 and 2024

=== Media coverage ===
Jacada Travel has been mentioned in several media outlets, including the Financial Times, The Guardian, and Vogue. In 2024, Skift quoted the company in an article on the impact of Iceland’s volcanic activity on tourism.
