= LATA =

LATA may refer to:

- Latin American Travel Association, a British travel industry to Latin America
- Local Access And Transport Area, a term in the telecommunication of the United States
