= Eating Europe =

American food tour operator based in Rome, Italy

- Formerly: Eating Italy Food Tours
- Type: Private
- Industry: Food tourism
- Founded: 2011 in Rome, Italy
- Founder: Kenny Dunn
- Headquarters: Rome, Italy
- Area served: Europe (20 cities, 10 countries)
- Key people: Kenny Dunn (Founder & CEO)
- Products: Food walking tours Cooking classes Private tours
- Website: eatingeurope.com

Eating Europe (formerly Eating Italy Food Tours) is an American-owned food tour operator headquartered in Rome, Italy. The company organises small-group culinary walking tours, cooking classes, and private food experiences across 20 cities in 10 European countries. As of 2024–25, the company has hosted more than 400,000 guests and holds over 10,000 five-star reviews on Tripadvisor.

== History ==
Kenny Dunn, a native of Philadelphia, Pennsylvania, relocated to Rome in 2009 after working at the United Nations Food and Agriculture Organization (FAO). Inspired by a food tour he experienced in Greenwich Village, New York City, Dunn founded Eating Italy Food Tours in Rome in 2011. The company is incorporated as a Delaware C corporation in the United States.

In 2013, the company expanded beyond Italy with the launch of tours in London and Prague. In 2014, the company launched tours in Amsterdam. Florence was added during the same period.

In 2019, the company rebranded from Eating Italy Food Tours to Eating Europe. That year it added tours in Lisbon, Paris, Naples, and Porto. In 2021, USA Today 10Best listed Eating Italy Food Tours (the company's former name) among recommended outdoor activities in Rome. Subsequent expansion added Berlin (2022); Athens, Venice, Palermo, and Milan (2023); Madrid, Edinburgh, and Bologna (2024); Barcelona, Seville, and San Sebastián (2025); and Copenhagen (2026). In 2022 and 2025, Eating Europe received the Viator Experience Award. In 2025, Eating Europe received the Arival TourReview Best of Europe Award.

== Operations ==
Eating Europe operates small-group walking tours led by local guides with specialist knowledge of regional food traditions. Tours include curated stops at street food markets, family-run restaurants, bakeries, and specialty food producers. The company also offers private tours and cooking classes.

In the group travel and cruise sectors, Eating Europe has established business-to-business partnerships with operators including Seabourn, Disney, Globus, Tauck, Avalon Waterways, and Carnival.
