= Social Trekking =

Social Trekking is a new concept in environmental awareness efforts, wherein tour operators and organizations committed to environmental conservation organize 'green-treks' to encourage people to recover and bring back garbage from environmentally sensitive glacier regions. Social treks are part of 'low impact tourism' efforts, designed with the aim of minimizing the carbon footprint of the event, while also recovering and bringing back any garbage found on the way and/or at the destination, usually situated in ecologically sensitive far flung hilly areas, where local municipal committees fail to ensure proper garbage recovery.
