= Suzana Grubješić =

Serbian politician

- Сузана Грубјешић
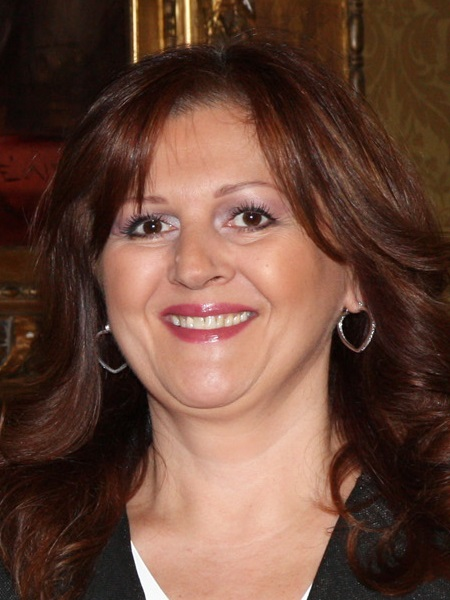
- Grubješić in 2013
- Born: 29 January 1963 (age 63); Sombor, SR Serbia, SFR Yugoslavia
- Occupation: Politician
- Years active: 1996–present
- Notable work: Negotiator for integration of Serbia into the European Union

Suzana Grubješić (Serbian Cyrillic: Сузана Грубјешић; born 1963) is a Serbian politician who served as the Deputy Prime Minister of Serbia from 2012 to 2014 under Ivica Dačić and also served on the National Assembly of the Republic of Serbia as both a G17 Plus member and United Regions of Serbia. She was involved in negotiations with the European Union and has actively sought integration of Serbia with the EU.

== Biography ==
Suzana Grubješić was born on 29 January 1963 in Sombor, Vojvodina province, Yugoslavia (now Serbia). She attended the University of Belgrade, graduating in 1986 in political science. From 1991 to 1992 she worked as a representative for the State Tourism operation, Yugotours in Pula, Croatia. From 1992 to 1996, she was general manager of Offshore Knipps Co. in Cyprus. At the end of the wars which capped the communist period in the 1990s, Grubješić moved into politics.

In 1996, she became project manager of the European Movement in Serbia and after a year, helped found an NGO called G17, a private group engaged in economic studies to spur growth and legislative change. When the G17 NGO became the political party G17 Plus (G17+) in 2003, Grubješić served as its executive director until 2008. She was a representative of G17+ in the Parliament of Serbia from 2003 to 2012.

Beginning in 2003, she worked on programs for integration with the European Union and was Speaker of the Serbian Parliament. In 2007 she was appointed as the head of the parliamentary group and served as a member of the Administrative Committee, the Committee for European Integration and the Committee on Development and International Economic Relations. She also served as the head of the Serbian delegation at the Organization for Security and Cooperation in Europe.

Beginning in March 2011, she became the Deputy Head of the parliamentary group of the United Regions of Serbia (URS) in the Serbian Parliament and under Prime Minister Ivica Dačić, she was appointed as Deputy Prime Minister from 27 July 2012 to 2 September 2013. In June 2014 she was appointed as Advisor to Rasim Ljajic, Minister of Foreign and Domestic Trade and Telecommunications. She speaks English, French, German and Greek.

== Sources ==
- Ramet, Sabrina P. (2010). Central and Southeast European Politics since 1989. Cambridge, UK: Cambridge University Press. ISBN 978-1-139-48750-4.
