= Kilimanjaro Porter Assistance Project =

NGO, advocating porters' rights on Mt Kilimanjaro, Tanzania

Kilimanjaro Porter Assistanc Project
- Formation: 2003
- Legal status: Non-governmental organization
- Purpose: Kilimanjaro porter rights protection and advocacy
- Headquarters: Moshi, Kilimanjaro, Tanzania
- Website: https://kiliporters.org

The Kilimanjaro Porters Assistance Project (KPAP) is a Tanzanian non-profit organisation established in 2003 with the mission to improve the working conditions of porters on Mount Kilimanjaro by promoting socially responsible climbs.

== History ==
The Kilimanjaro Porters Assistance Project (KPAP) was established in 2003 as a Tanzania-focused initiative promoting responsible travel. It was created as an offshoot International Mountain Explorers Connection (IMEC), a nonprofit organization founded in 1996 to promote sustainable travel in the Himalayas.

IMEC was initially formed to address the poor working conditions and low wages experienced by porters in Nepal. During his climbs in the Himalayas, Scott Dimetrosky, the founder of IMEC, observed the stark contrast between the harsh conditions faced by Nepali porters and the relative affluence of the tourists they served. This disparity motivated him to create a nonprofit organization dedicated to advocating for fair treatment and improving the livelihoods of porters and their families.

IMEC's mission to foster ethical and sustainable relationships between explorers and the communities in developing alpine regions was later extended to Tanzania with the establishment of KPAP.

== Actions ==
=== Objectives ===
KPAP focuses on several key areas to support porters:

- Advocacy for Fair Treatment: KPAP advocates for fair wages and ethical treatment of porters, ensuring they receive appropriate compensation and working conditions.
- Provision of Equipment: The organization lends donated mountain gear to porters free of charge, ensuring they have access to necessary equipment for safe climbs.
- Educational Opportunities: KPAP offers educational classes to empower porters, enhancing their skills and knowledge related to mountaineering and safety.

=== Membership ===
KPAP membership is available through the 'Partner for Responsible Travel' scheme to Tanzania-based tour operators and foreign travel agencies that organize climbs through Tanzania-based member companies.

To qualify as a member, companies must adhere to a set of guidelines aimed at ensuring ethical treatment and fair working conditions for porters. As of 2024, these requirements are:

1. Paying porters a minimum daily wage of 20,000 Tanzanian shillings.
2. Ensuring wages are paid no later than two days after the expedition concludes.
3. Providing porters with three adequately sized meals per day during expeditions.
4. Supplying porters with high-quality tents that offer sufficient sleeping space for the entire crew.
5. Limiting the load carried by each porter to a maximum of 20 kilograms (44 pounds).
6. Employing at least three porters per climber on most routes, or two porters per climber on the Marangu route.
7. Guaranteeing a fair and transparent distribution of tips among all members of the mountain crew, including porters, guides, and cooks.
8. Providing appropriate gear for all porters.
9. Ensuring proper first aid and medical care for porters in case of illness or injury.

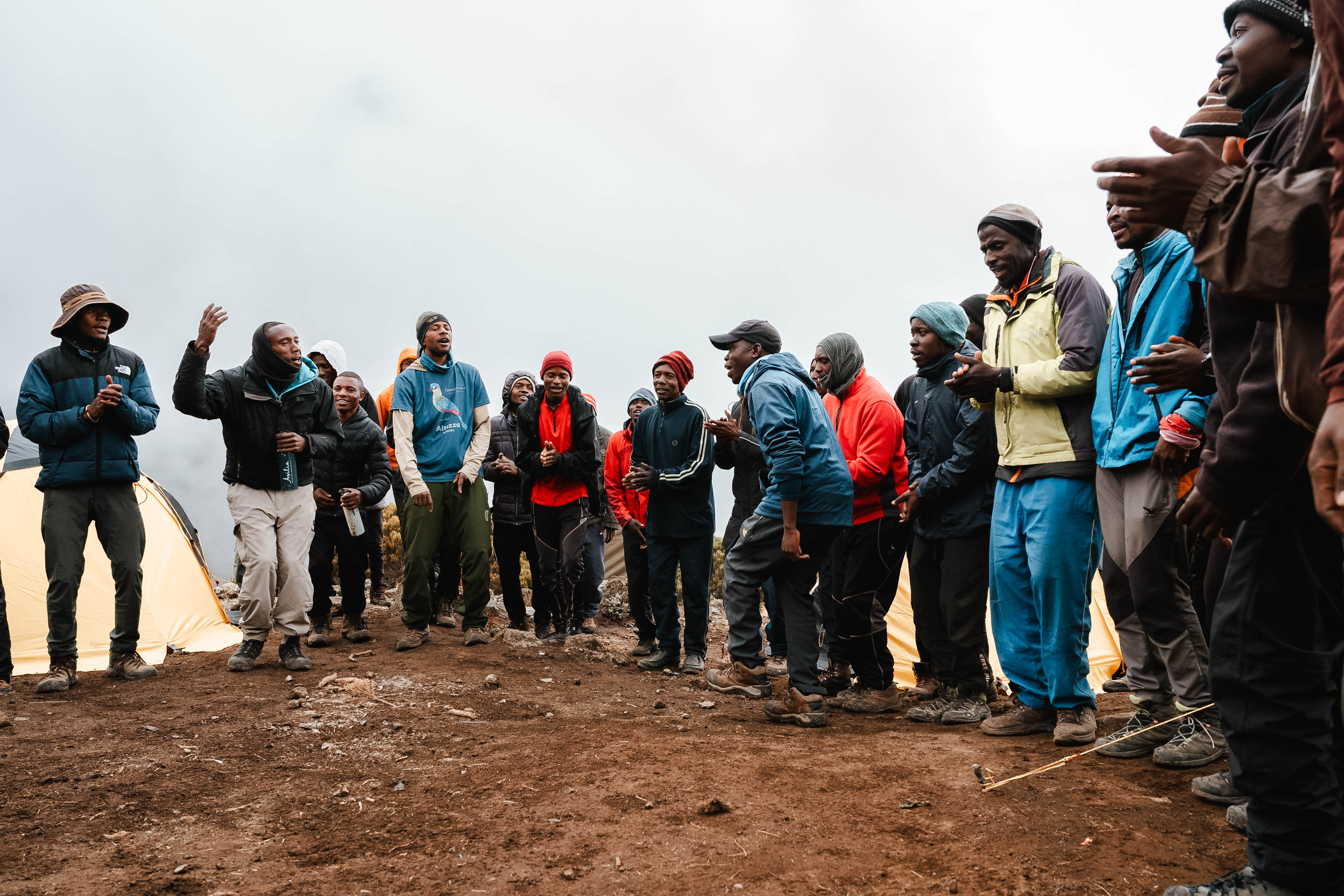
Kilimanjaro porters performing a traditional mountain dance for the trekkers

KPAP inspectors accompany each expedition on Mount Kilimanjaro to monitor compliance with these standards. After descending the mountain, inspectors submit detailed reports evaluating the organization of the expedition from a porter perspective.

These reports are used to calculate an internal rating for each member company over a six-month period. To maintain membership, companies must achieve a rating of 85% or higher. Companies failing to meet this threshold or engaging in exploitative practices are removed from the KPAP partner list.

=== Whistleblowing ===
Apart from the specifically assigned porters, any member of a mountain crew who has participated in expeditions with a member company can report instances of mistreatment or inadequate working conditions to KPAP. Upon receiving such reports, KPAP staff investigate the claims and engage with the company to address and resolve the issues.

=== Impact ===
The Kilimanjaro Porters Assistance Project (KPAP) is instrumental in improving the working conditions of porters on Mount Kilimanjaro. Through its Partner for Responsible Travel Program, the organization ensures that more than 7,000 porters each year receive fair wages and ethical treatment during climbs. Funding from the Tanzanian Foundation for Civil Society made it possible to educate 5,225 porters about their rights.

The KPAP has also played a significant role in raising awareness among tour operators and tourists regarding the treatment and compensation of porters. The organisations efforts have led to some improvements, including better wages and increased adherence to regulations concerning load weights. Averagely, as of 2022 porter working for a KPAP-affiliated company earned Ts 36,074 per day. In contract, porters working for non-affiliated operators earned Ts25,860 averagely.

KPAP has also provided free educational programs to over 16,000 mountain crew members, offering lessons in English, financial literacy, and HIV/AIDS prevention. During the COVID-19 pandemic, the organization adapted to the challenges by introducing workshops focused on financial planning, alternative income generation, community savings, and organic farming, benefiting over 4,000 individuals

== Controversies ==
The Kilimanjaro Porters Assistance Project (KPAP) has faced criticism from some Tanzanian tour operators who allege that its stringent ethical guidelines disproportionately favor foreign-owned companies, thereby disadvantageing local businesses. Local operators contend that compliance with KPAP's standards imposes financial burdens that are more easily managed by foreign firms with greater resources. This situation has reportedly led to a decline in business for Tanzanian operators, as international travel agents increasingly partner with KPAP-certified companies, many of which are foreign-owned.

Additionally, local tour operators argue that KPAP's practices may contravene Tanzania's Tourism Act, which reserves mountain climbing and trekking activities for local businesses. They assert that the current distribution of KPAP-certified companies—where a significant majority are foreign-owned—undermines the intent of the legislation and threatens the livelihoods of local operators and porters.

In response to these allegations, KRTO has denied any unfair trade practices, emphasizing its commitment to ethical trekking and environmental conservation on Mount Kilimanjaro. The organization maintains that its guidelines are designed to ensure fair treatment of porters and do not intentionally favor any group of operators
