= Operation Redfold =

British defence contingency plan

- Part of Brexit
- Type: Military aid to the civil authorities

Operation Redfold is a defence contingency plan of the United Kingdom designed to guide military aid to civil authorities in the event of a generalised emergency arising during the post-Brexit period. It is the military planning programme of the civilian-led Operation Yellowhammer.

Up to 3,500 personnel of the British Armed Forces have been contingently tasked with support of Operation Redfold, of which about 350 are reservists. It was reported in The Times in September 2019, that a large contingent of the 3,500 strong force would be drawn from the Royal Military Police. Upon activation, operational activities will be headquartered in the Pindar complex, according to media reports, but command and control would be co-ordinated from a bunker in MoD Whitehall.

== See also ==
- Operation Brock
- Operation Yellowhammer
