= Newmarket Holidays =

British tour operator based in Wallington, Surrey

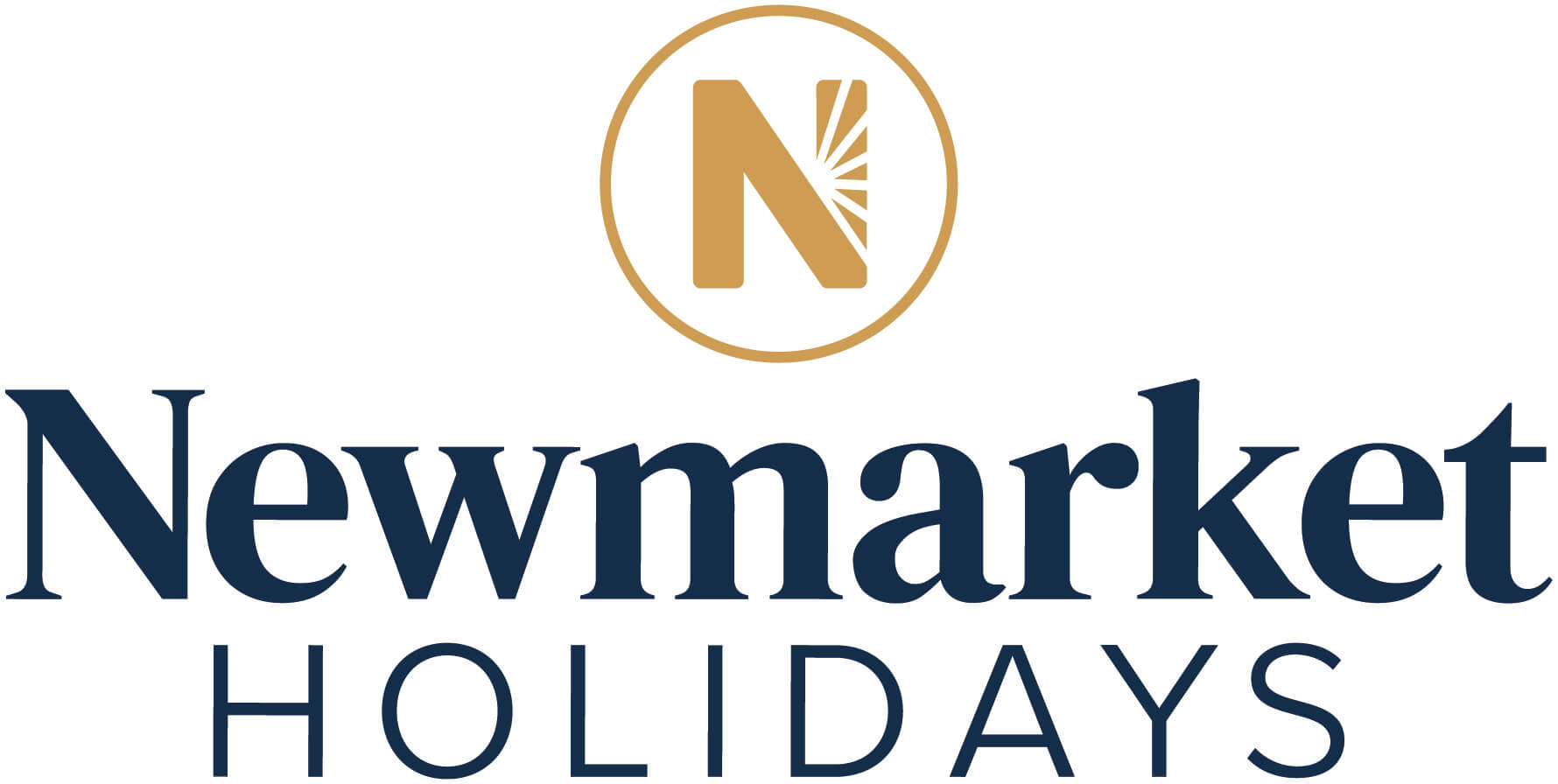

Newmarket Holidays, part of The Newmarket Group, is a British tour operator based in Wallington, Greater London, providing escorted holidays, resort-based stays and event-based tours to destinations throughout the UK, in Europe and to worldwide destinations. The group employs 180 staff at its Surrey head office.

== History ==
=== Foundation, Ownership and Industry Accreditations ===
Toni Frei and Jeremy Griffin founded Newmarket Promotions Limited, the parent company of Newmarket Holidays, and incorporated the business on 22 March 1983. Managing Director Simon Hibbs joined them in 1984, and together, the three are shareholders of the group. Frei initially worked in publishing, including Haymarket Publishing, while Griffin worked for pioneering hotel group Grand Metropolitan Hotels. Hibbs, a graduate of St Catharine's College, Cambridge University, qualified as a Chartered Accountant at Price Waterhouse (now PWC) and began his career with the firm before joining Newmarket as Chief Executive.

Newmarket Holidays, incorporated in 1988 is a wholly owned subsidiary of the parent company. Both companies are members of ABTA and Newmarket Air Holidays holds an ATOL licence.

=== Early history ===
Newmarket's first few years of trading focused on providing reader travel arrangements to UK newspaper publishers. Client newspapers included regional titles, a large number of local newspapers and national newspapers.

Early coach travel-inclusive holidays offered by Newmarket Holidays included London, Paris and Amsterdam, to which a range of UK breaks, including the Edinburgh Military Tattoo, and longer duration European trips, including Switzerland, Austria and France, were added.

The incorporation of Newmarket Air Holidays enabled the Group to offer air-travel-inclusive arrangements, with Malta an early destination for the group.

The opening of Disneyland Paris (formerly Eurodisney) in 1992 was significant for the Newmarket Group, as the company established itself as a UK tour operating partner of the resort, receiving the Leisure Group Operator of the Year award in 1999, and the relationship led to the establishment of Newmarket's Study Experiences division, which holds curriculum-led educational seminars and conferences at Disneyland Paris each year.

=== Newmarket Holidays Today ===
Newmarket Holidays has continued to expand its offerings to travelers, adding new destinations and new flights on a regular basis. In the summer of 2011, the company added two new destinations via direct flights leaving from Cardiff Airport. These charter flights go directly to Naples and Verona, and packages include options to visit seven cities in seven days or to explore just one location over the course of a full week. 2010 also saw Newmarket Holidays launching a new catalogue of Festive Season trips and escorted holidays by air to a number of new European and global locations. In June 2013, following the closure of Manston Airport, Newmarket Holidays began operating a number of direct charter flights to Italy from Lydd London Ashford Airport.

The company celebrated its 30th year in business in 2013. As part of the celebration, they unveiled a new brand identity, including a new logo and slogan, "Crafted with Care". The tour operator has also expanded its operations, and served nearly 230,000 customers in 2013.

In 2014, Newmarket Holidays began a technology transformation process, which has included partnering with cloud-based telephony provider Syntec.

In May 2015, the company moved from McMillan House, in Worcester Park, to Cantium House in Wallington, Surrey.

Newmarket Holidays still focuses on providing reader travel arrangements for newspaper publishers. Clients include national publishers News Corp UK & Ireland Limited – particularly their publications the Sun and The Times – the Daily Mail, Daily Telegraph, The Guardian and Mirror Group, several regional newspaper groups, including Trinity Mirror Regionals plc, Newsquest Media Group, Local World, Archant Limited, Tindle Newspapers Limited, DC Thomson & Co Ltd, The KM Group, The Express and Star and The Irish News, as well as independent titles.

In addition, Newmarket Holidays has established trading partnerships with retail travel agencies, and is a key member of the Truly Independent Professional Travel Organisation (TIPTO), with the company's Agency Sales Manager serving as a member of TIPTO's executive team since September 2014. The company's Air Holidays aspect has grown to encompass chartered holidays from regional airports across the UK, including Durham and Cambridge.

In addition to its range of coach- and air-inclusive holidays, which feature destinations throughout Europe and worldwide, Newmarket Holidays is a provider of travel- and accommodation-inclusive arrangements to events such as the Royal Edinburgh Military Tattoo, the Wimbledon Lawn Tennis Championships, the annual opening to the public of Buckingham Palace, and to concerts by veteran British pop-star Cliff Richard, Irish singer Daniel O'Donnell and Dutch violinist André Rieu. It is also the operator of Remembrance Travel packages on behalf of the Royal British Legion.
