= Latin American Travel Association =

Travel association in UK

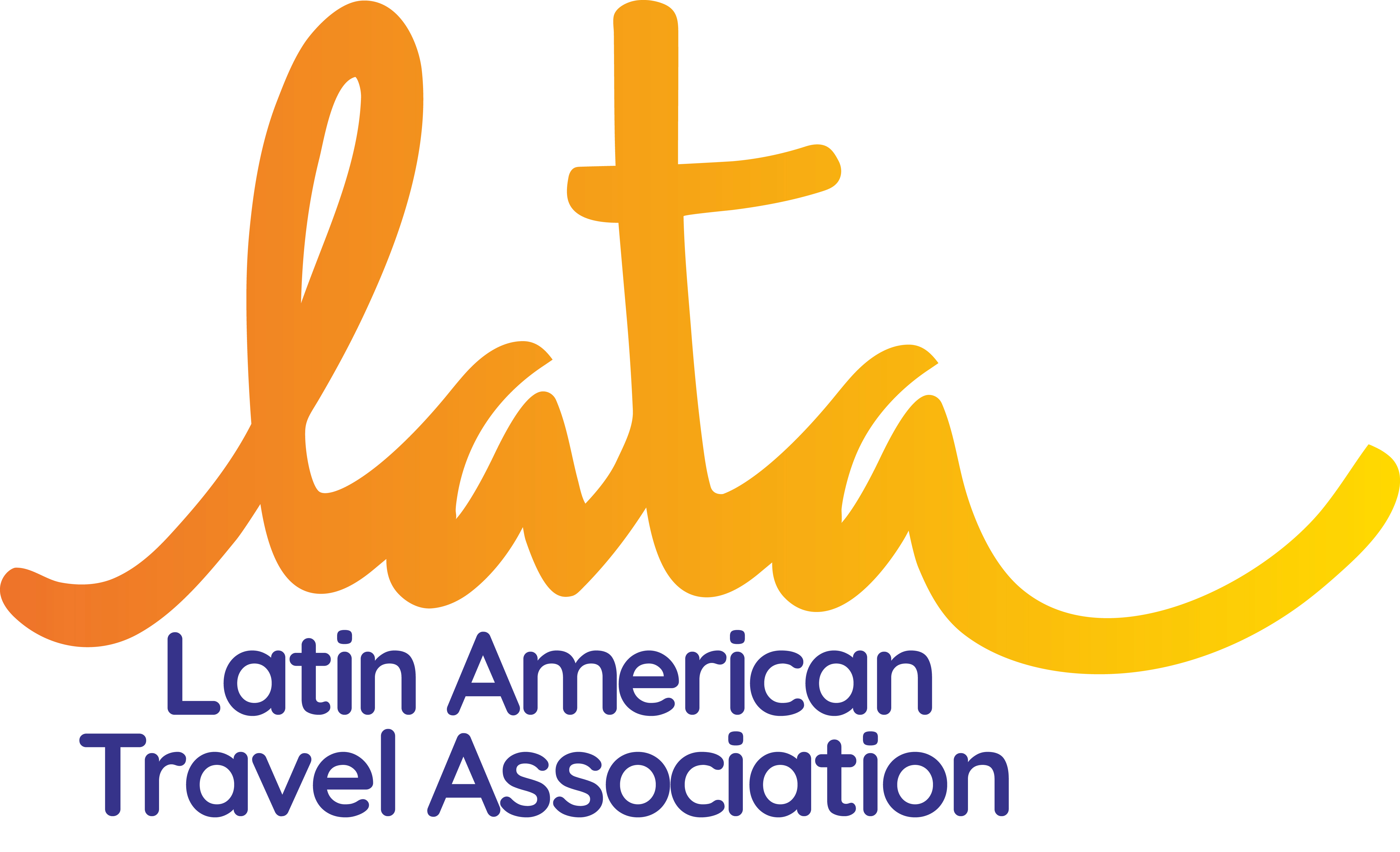

The Latin American Travel Association (LATA) is a UK travel industry association whose purpose is to promote travel to Latin American destinations.

Its members include airlines, tour operator's and travel agents, as well as tourist boards of various Latin American countries. There are over 200 members in all, ranging from large airlines such as Air France and Iberia to individual hotels.

LATA claims to vet members before they join, but does not actually offer any form of consumer protection (unlike ABTA or ATOL bonding).

Its website includes a member directory and a brief tourist guide to the countries of Latin America.

== Notable members ==
Airlines including Air France / KLM, British Airways, Iberia Airlines, LATAM Airlines Group, Air Europa, Aerolíneas Argentinas and United Airlines

Tourist boards of Brazil, Colombia, Peru, and the Falkland Islands

== LATA Foundation ==
The LATA Foundation (Registered Charity number 1123580) is dedicated to promoting responsible business practices in the tourism industry as well as sustainable development, conservation and poverty relief in Latin America by funding, supporting and developing charitable projects throughout the region.
