= Yugotours =

Defunct UK tour operator

- Industry: Tourism, Travel
- Founded: 1959
- Defunct: 2007
- Successor: Med-Choice
- Headquarters: Chesham house, 150 Regent Street, London, United Kingdom
- Key people: Alison Gray (marketing manager)
- Products: Package Holidays
- Owner: Yugoslavian Government
- Divisions: Yugotour Holiday Club
- Website: www.yugotours.co.rs/eng/

Yugotours was a Yugoslavian state-owned tour operator and travel agency. It was the largest tour operator for the Adriatic Sea, and at its peak the United Kingdom's fourth-biggest.

== History ==
=== Early history ===
The Yugoslavian carrier Aviogenex operated regular charters from the Manston (later Kent International Airport) to the then-popular beach resorts of Dalmatia in Yugoslavia on behalf of Yugotours from its formation in 1957, gaining ground in the 1970s as foreign holidays became increasingly popular, and even more so in the 1980s.

=== End ===
By the end of the 1980s, before the breakup of Yugoslavia, the country was the United Kingdom's second most popular overseas holiday destination behind Spain. During its heyday, the tour operator sent close to 500,000 holidaymakers a year to the countries of former Yugoslavia, namely Croatia, Slovenia and Montenegro.

By the early 1990s as Yugoslavia's political framework came under strain, Yugotours faced fierce competition from then market leaders Thomson. By 1992, with Yugoslavia embroiled in inter-ethnic warfare, there were fears over the future of the brand, with fears of it being relegated to sub-brand status or dropped altogether. These fears were reaffirmed by Alison Gray, Yugotours marketing manager, who remarked that "It's a delicate balance. For those who link Yugotours to Yugoslavia negatively, it could be a turn-off." Into this vacuum Thomson, Lunn Poly and Owners Abroad stepped in left by the collapse of the International Leisure Group with it brands like Club 18-30, Global, Intasun.

However, the brand survived until 2007, providing holidays to the newly independent former Yugoslav republics, mostly Croatia. From 2007, it was finally absorbed into the Med-Choice brand, covering the whole Mediterranean area.

== Other ==
Yugotours was famous for its 1986 catchphrase "Sun-sational Yugoslavia!"

== Yugotours staff reunion ==
In May 2019, more than a decade after its final collapse, around 120 former employees met at a resort in Poreč, present-day Croatia for a reunion. The four-day event included a cocktail party, a boat trip to Rovinj via the Lim bay, and a Grand Yugotours Reunion gala dinner in Villa Polesini.

== Logos ==
For this travel agency, there was two different logos. The first logo of travel agency has been in use from 1959 to 1982, and the second and final logo was in use from 1982 to closure in 2007.

== See also ==
- MyTravel Group
- Clarksons Travel Group
