= Operation Yellowhammer =

UK cross-government contingency planning for the possibility of a "no-deal" Brexit

Operation Yellowhammer was the codename used by the British HM Treasury for cross-government civil contingency planning for the possibility of Brexit without a withdrawal agreement – a no-deal Brexit. Had the UK and EU failed to conclude such an agreement, the UK's unilateral departure from the EU could have disrupted, for an unknown duration, many aspects of the relationship between the UK and European Union, including financial transfers, movement of people, trade, customs and other regulations. Operation Yellowhammer was intended to mitigate, within the UK, some of the effects of this disruption, and was expected to run for approximately three months. It was developed by the Civil Contingencies Secretariat (CCS), a department of the Cabinet Office responsible for emergency planning.

In early August 2019, after Boris Johnson had become Prime Minister, the Cabinet Office "was not able to confirm" that the Operation Yellowhammer plan remained in place, although a Yellowhammer document from earlier that month was leaked in mid-August to The Sunday Times journalist Rosamund Urwin and continues to be updated.

On 3 September 2019, Chancellor of the Duchy of Lancaster Michael Gove, whose responsibilities included preparations for a no-deal Brexit, said in the House of Commons: "Operation Yellowhammer assumptions are not a prediction of what is likely to happen, they are not a best-case scenario or a list of probable outcomes, they are projections of what may happen in a worst-case scenario." An otherwise unchanged version of Yellowhammer leaked earlier to The Times was titled "base case" scenario rather than the "reasonable worst case" scenario of the officially published document; a copy given to the Scottish government was titled "base scenario".

The Sunday Times reported that Operation Yellowhammer was one of three scenarios being studied, the other two were Operation Kingfisher, involving a support package for distressed British businesses, and Operation Black Swan, a disaster scenario. Michael Gove characterised the report as inaccurate.

== Disclosure and naming ==
The existence of the operation leaked on 6 September 2018, when a press photographer captured a snapshot of a document revealing some "no-deal" plans and the HM Treasury codename for them. The document appeared to indicate the CCS had been used in anticipation of government policy. No further details were revealed. The National Audit Office (NAO) subsequently made some documents public relating to the operation.

The operation code name "Yellowhammer", which relates to a small songbird, was chosen at random according to The Times, but it has been suggested that the code name is an allusion to the call of the Yellowhammer traditionally being described as "a little bit of bread, and no cheese", a description which might also apply to food rationing.

On 2 February 2019, The Times received leaked documents with this code name, about Department for Transport command and control structure plans.

== Activation plan ==
Operation Yellowhammer covers actions to be taken in a no-deal scenario, some of which would be implemented prior to the date of leaving.

On 29 January 2019 the House of Commons voted, in a non-binding ballot, to reject a no-deal Brexit. Unless the House of Commons were to accept the Brexit withdrawal agreement, or the EU's other members were to grant the UK an extension under Article 50 of the Lisbon Treaty, or the UK were to revoke its Article 50 notice, the United Kingdom would by default have exited the EU on 29 March 2019 with no deal.

On 20 March 2019, Kent County Council activated plans to keep roads, hospitals and schools open, and the Brexit secretary, Steve Barclay, said that Operation Yellowhammer command and control structures would be "enacted fully" on 25 March 2019 unless a new exit date was agreed between the UK and the EU. On 21 March 2019, the Ministry of Defence staffed a bunker under its Whitehall headquarters to coordinate no-deal related military activities under Operation Redfold, and the COBR emergency committee took control of no-deal planning with intentions to implement national contingency plans on 25 March 2019. (Note: This announcement was made prior to the agreement between the UK and the EU27 late on 21 March 2019, for an extension to 31 October.)

Late on 21 March 2019, possible new exit dates were agreed between the UK and the EU:

- 22 May 2019 if the House of Commons approved the Brexit withdrawal agreement by 29 March 2019; (Note: According to the European Union (Withdrawal) Act 2018 (before subsequent amendments), should the House of Commons not approve the withdrawal agreement by 29 March 2019, the default legal position would be that the UK would have exited the EU on 12 April 2019.) or
- 12 April 2019 otherwise.

Consequently, full activation of Operation Yellowhammer was postponed until 8 April 2019.

On 10 April 2019 the European Council granted the UK a six-month extension; Yellowhammer's 6,000-strong civil service team was disbanded a few weeks afterwards, with most members returning to their usual activities. Developments since then – with Theresa May resigning as leader of the Conservative Party and both candidates to replace her talking of leaving without a deal by 31 October deadline – may make it necessary to resume preparations. The Institute for Government said that the government may never be as ready for a no-deal Brexit as it was for the original departure date at the end of March. According to Joe Owen, the IfG's Brexit programme director, reinstating Yellowhammer and reinstating thousands of civil servants to implement no-deal contingency plans is a formidable task; everything will need to be "resurrected and restaffed, and earlier rounds of staff training will need to be repeated". According to the Financial Times and others, this is a sign that we have already run out of time.

On Monday 21 October 2019, The Cabinet Office announced it had held an emergency Operation Yellowhammer Cabinet meeting on Sunday 20th 2019, "triggering" the plan, because it said there was no guarantee the EU would grant an extension. This followed the Prime Minister's compliance (on 19 October) with his obligation under the Benn Act to request an extension to Article 50 from the EU. Tom Brake, the Liberal Democrat's Brexit spokesman said of the need for an extension, "if it is required, will be granted, leaving Yellowhammer nothing more than an expensive taxpayer-funded PR stunt." The EU granted the requested extension a week later, on 28 October.

=== EU preparedness ===
The European Commission issued a press release on 25 March 2019 indicating it had completed preparations for (what was then) an increasingly likely "no-deal" scenario on 12 April 2019.

== Organisation ==
Operation Yellowhammer was developed by the Civil Contingencies Secretariat, though COBR took control on 25 March 2019. It will be organised via a Command and control structure (C3), which will co-ordinate:

- Up to 30 British Government departments

- If a Government department's contingency plans are inadequate Operation Yellowhammer will take over planning and decisions for that department.

- Approximately 40 Local Resilience Forums in England and Wales
- Similar bodies in Northern Ireland and Scotland
- Governing authorities for the United Kingdom, overseas territories and crown dependencies
- Co-ordination with impacted industries and sectors.

Major decisions will be taken by the European Union Exit and Trade (Preparedness) Sub-Committee, set up in January 2019 and chaired by the prime minister. It will have wide-ranging powers to order emergency measures, including use of the military, and overriding regulations.

=== Relationships ===
The CCS may work with the Department for Exiting the European Union (DExEU) to achieve an objective for Brexit work, with the DExEU concentrating on new policies, legislative changes and required funding changes with the CCS dealing with steps to mitigate and manage short-term disruption. An example objective would be Continuity of supply of medicines into the UK after no deal exit from the EU falling within the areas of risk of key goods crossing borders and transport systems. Arrangements for prioritisation of key goods, additional ferry capacity and having procedures in place for operation customs operations that are effective immediately from the Brexit date are some of the areas covered.

== Areas of risk ==
Operation Yellowhammer identifies 12 areas of risk. These include the food and medicine supply chains and the status of British citizens residing in the EU. There are also three risks common to all areas. The twelve areas of risk identified are: transport systems, people crossing borders, key goods crossing borders, healthcare services, British energy and other critical systems, British food and water supplies, British nationals in the EU, law enforcement implications, banking and finance industry services, Brexit and the Irish border, specific risks to overseas territories and Crown dependencies (including the effect of Brexit on Gibraltar) and national security. Risks common to all areas identified are: legal, communications and data.

== Costs and resources ==
In March 2019 the CCS had 56 people working internally on the programme; it is estimated 140 would be needed to maintain the operations centre and it has been budgeted to cost £1.1 million in 2018–2019. This is in the context of the British Treasury allocating £1.5 billion for Brexit preparations by government departments in 2018–2019.

3,500 troops were placed on standby to 'assist the civil power' in the event of issues arising from a no-deal exit, although the Ministry of Defence had only disclosed their mission will be to "support government planning".

== Criticism ==
On 21 March 2019, the British government's decision to risk a no-deal Brexit and to invoke Operation Yellowhammer was criticised by the First Minister of Scotland, Nicola Sturgeon. Her sentiments were echoed by the First Minister of Wales, Mark Drakeford. On 22 March confidential Cabinet documents on Operation Yellowhammer were obtained by The Guardian newspaper. The document warned that ministers could need to work 22.5-hour days, and departments would have to work 24 hours a day for at least twelve weeks without input from higher up in government. A source with knowledge of the operation said that, although planning had stepped up, the overall picture remained chaotic and "rudderless".

== August 2019 leak ==
In mid-August 2019 an official cabinet Yellowhammer document from earlier that month was leaked. The paper gave base-case planning assumptions in the event of a no-deal Brexit which could lead to food, medicine and petrol shortages, with a hard border in the island of Ireland, and a "three-month meltdown" at ports unable to cope with extra checks. There could be protests requiring police action, and thousands of jobs could be lost as two oil refineries closed. Government ministers disputed the report and dismissed its warnings as "worst-case". The Sunday Times, according to The Observer, said that a senior Whitehall source said "This is not Project Fear, this is the most realistic assessment of what the public face with no deal. These are likely, basic, reasonable scenarios – not the worst case."

== September 2019 publication ==
A humble address was passed by the House of Commons on 9 September 2019 requiring the government "to lay before this House no later than 11.00pm Wednesday 11 September all the documents prepared within Her Majesty's Government since 23 July 2019 relating to operation Yellowhammer and submitted to the Cabinet or a Cabinet Committee".

In compliance, on 11 September the Government released a five-page document entitled "Operation Yellowhammer: HMG Reasonable Worst Case Planning Assumptions as of 2 August 2019". Other than a change of title – from "Base Scenario" to "Reasonable Worst Case Planning Assumptions" – and one redacted paragraph reportedly dealing with the impact on the oil refining industry, the document was essentially identical to the one leaked in August.

The document was the subject of a two-hour long "Brexit readiness and Operation Yellowhammer" Ministerial statement and debate led by Michael Gove on 25 September, the day Parliament resumed session after the Supreme Court failed the prorogation attempted by Boris Johnson. During the debate the opposition focused on the modification of the title, from "Base case" to "Worst case". The petrol tariff was revealed by opposition members to be zero, and there was some concern expressed by Adrian Bailey and Melanie Onn about job losses at uncompetitive British plant.

== Other plans ==
According to The Sunday Times Operation Yellowhammer was one of three scenarios being studied, the other two were Operation Kingfisher, involving a support package for distressed British businesses, and Operation Black Swan, a disaster scenario. Michael Gove characterised the report as inaccurate.

=== Operation Kingfisher ===
Operation Kingfisher was part of the UK Government's contingency planning for a no-deal Brexit. The programme was intended to help companies over the transition period. A report published by the Times of London on 10 August detailed the programme to help large employers, particularly in the construction and manufacturing sectors, because of their long supply chains. Fewer than 1,000 businesses were on the watchlist. The plan, which was conceived under Chancellor of the Exchequer Philip Hammond as a means to inject cash from the public purse directly into businesses, continued to be maintained under the Johnson government's Chancellor of the Duchy of Lancaster, Michael Gove.

=== Operation Black Swan ===
Operation Black Swan is an alleged government programme aimed to prepare for a "worst-case" scenario of Brexit. Museums were particularly concerned to ensure the transit of precious artworks to and from a disrupted shipping chain which would become a "logistical nightmare". Michael Gove was on record as denying the existence such a plan, which appeared to have been leaked to The Times newspaper by a former cabinet minister who was unhappy at being dismissed in the 2019 British cabinet formation.

== See also ==
- Operation Redfold, the UK's post-Brexit defence contingency plan
- Operation Brock, the contingency plan for handling potential cross channel freight roads congestion post-Brexit
- Brexit and the Irish border
