= Operation Stack =

Contingency plan for traffic congestion in Kent

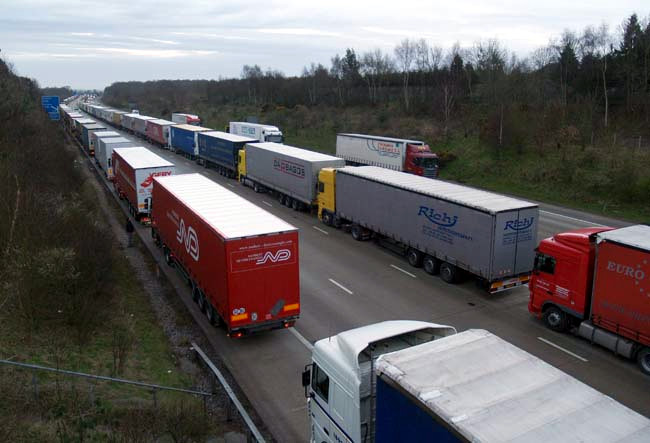
- Operation Stack being implemented in March 2008

- Operation Stack (Kent)
- Location: Kent, England, UK; 51.0926°N 1.0924°E
- Grid reference: TR169374

Operation Stack was a procedure used by Kent Police and the Port of Dover in England to park (or "stack") lorries on the M20 motorway in Kent when services across the English Channel, such as those through the Channel Tunnel or from the Port of Dover, are disrupted, for example by bad weather, industrial action, fire, or derailments in the tunnel. Since 2019, it has been superseded by the Operation Brock contraflow system.

Operation Stack was managed by Kent Police using powers under the Civil Contingencies Act 2004 and coordinated by a multi-agency group known as Operation Fennel.

According to Damian Green MP, by 2007 the system had been implemented 74 times in the 20 years since it was first introduced.

== Causes ==
Operation Stack is implemented whenever there is an urgent need to inhibit the flow of traffic to the Channel Tunnel and the Port of Dover, which handle 90% of freight traffic between the United Kingdom and mainland Europe. There are officially only 550 parking spaces for HGVs in Kent, so if access to cross-channel services is restricted, congestion would quickly spread across the county.

The most common causes of Operation Stack are severe weather that either cancels or restricts ferry services, industrial action at the French ports of Calais, Dunkirk, and Boulogne, and electrical failures in the Channel Tunnel.

== Procedure ==
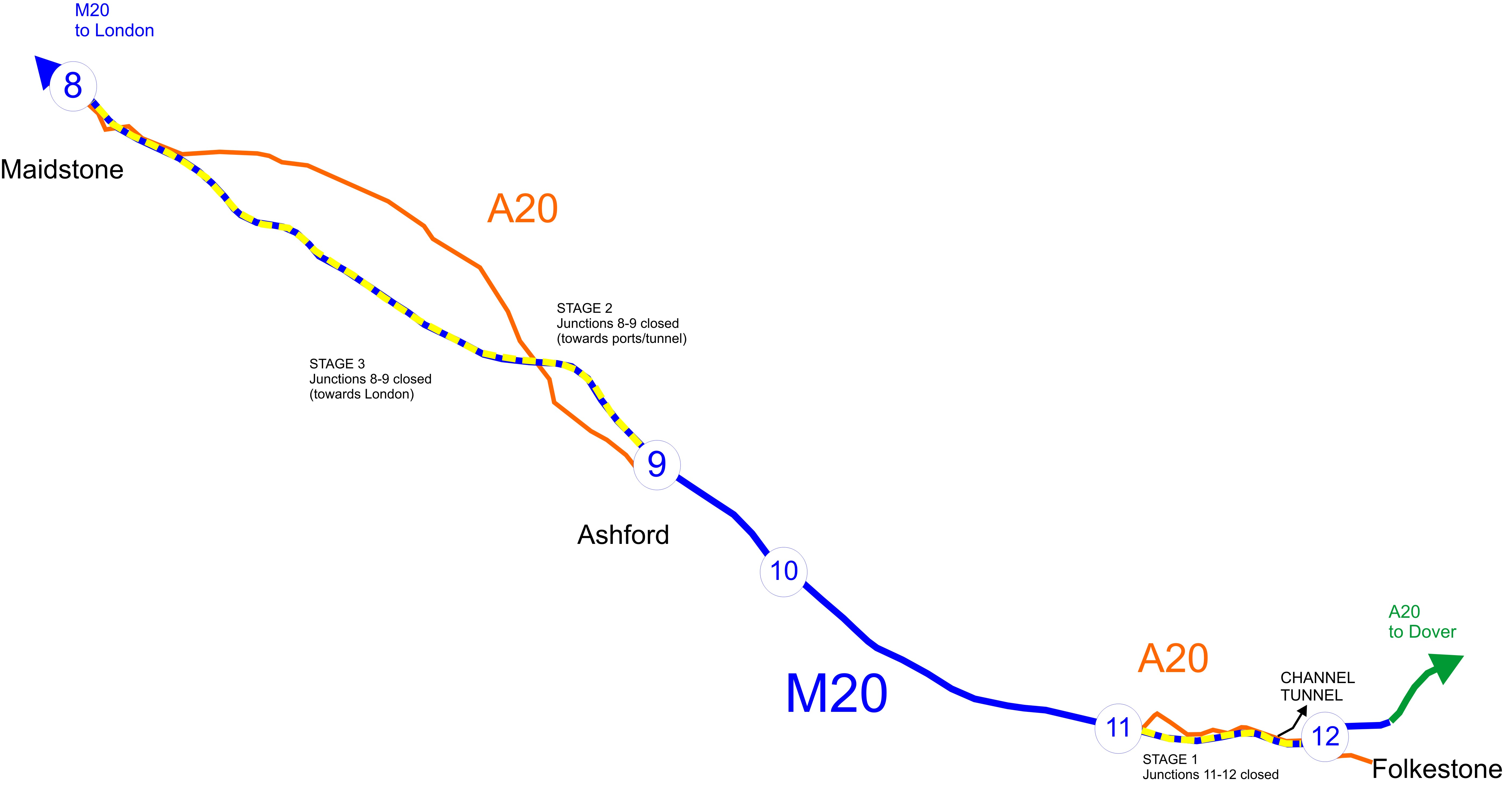
A map of the phases of Operation Stack

The M20 is the main road from the London Orbital Motorway (the M25), the world's largest and busiest ring road, to the Port of Dover, the busiest ferry terminal in Europe, and the Channel Tunnel. It runs south-east from the M25 near Swanley through Kent via the county town Maidstone, Ashford, and Folkestone to Dover. Most of the road is three lanes in each direction as far Folkestone, then two lanes to Dover.

Lorries are parked on the carriageways as below, with all other traffic diverted onto the parallel A20 road:

- Phase 1: Coast-bound from Junction 11 (Hythe) to 12 (Cheriton), 3.6 miles (5.8 km)
- Phase 2: Coast-bound from Junction 8 (Maidstone) to 9 (Ashford), 13.5 miles (21.7 km)
- Phase 3: London-bound from Junction 9 (Ashford) to 8 (Maidstone), 13.5 miles (21.7 km)
- Phase 4: Coast-bound from Junction 8 (Maidstone) to 12 (Cheriton), 26.5 miles (42.6 km)

If congestion reaches from Junction 8 to Junction 11 (22.9 miles (36.9 km)), traffic for the Port of Dover is diverted to Manston Airfield while traffic for the Channel Tunnel remains on the M20.

By stacking lorries along the motorway, up to 3,000 additional parking spaces for freight can be created. The decision to implement each phase of the programme is taken in conjunction with Kent Police, the Port of Dover, and National Highways. Local traffic often uses the parallel A20 (the old turnpike road from Maidstone to Folkestone) or the A2 (the historic Roman Road from London to Dover via Canterbury), though neither offers the same capacity as the M20.

The road can be closed for days at a time, and as a result Operation Stack has been controversial.

== History ==
=== 1988 ===
Operation Stack was first introduced in February 1988, because of a strike called by the National Union of Seamen in Folkestone Docks, which was then an important ferry terminal, that began on 31 January. Though the strike stopped after three days, there was still a tailback and local protests and struggle between Folkestone and Dover. The whole of the M20 between Ashford and Folkestone was closed; at the time, the motorway was incomplete between junctions 8 at Leeds Castle and 9 at Ashford.

=== 1999–2000 ===
In 1999, Parliamentary Under Secretary for Transport Keith Hill commissioned a study by the Channel Road transport Group to look at alternatives. The following year, Michael Howard asked Secretary of State for the Environment, Transport and the Regions John Prescott about alternative methods to Operation Stack. Prescott replied that he would investigate matters but defended the status quo, saying "Management schemes can make traffic flows much better, and they are almost inevitable in difficult circumstances."

=== 2005 ===
In early 2005, Kent Police implemented Operation Stack several times within a few weeks due to bad weather (snow), a strike and a damaged berth in Calais, which limited the number of ferries which could cross the channel. By the end of June 2005, Operation Stack was implemented a total of 18 times in the first half of the year and cost Kent Police £123,000 in overtime.

=== 2007 ===
At the end of January 2007, local Members of Parliament Damian Green of Ashford and Stephen Ladyman of Thanet were involved in a debate covering Operation Stack in the House of Commons. Everyone agreed that stacking was a problem, but there were no firm decisions as to any alternatives.

=== 2008 ===
On 5 March 2008 industrial action that had begun in late February by French workers operating SeaFrance cross-channel ferries resulted in Kent Police initiating phase 2 of Operation Stack. The industrial action lasted for a number of days, with the backlog on the M20 causing significant disruption. The MEP for South East England, Richard Ashworth, and the leader of Kent County Council, Paul Carter, urged French president Nicolas Sarkozy to step in and resolve the dispute because of the resulting difficulties. This was the first time in the 20-year history of Operation Stack that the M20 was closed for more than three days; businesses in nearby towns reported trade down by up to 50%.

According to Kent Police logs, one, two, or three phases of Operation Stack were implemented for at least part of each day between 28 February and 15 March 2008. The Freight Transport Association estimated the cost of disruption to be between £4m-£5m at 9 March 2008. Kent County Council later announced progress with plans to construct a lorry park for temporary use to mitigate the effects of Operation Stack. This has met with opposition from the borough councilor for Saxon Shore ward where it would be sited; he accused the county council of "not thinking strategically", not considering the environmental impact properly, and of siting it too close to a National Grid facility, where he expects the fuel in vehicles to be a danger to a "facility of strategic national importance."

=== 2015 ===
On 24 June 2015, Operation Stack was implemented due to industrial action taken by French employees of the MyFerryLink company, as a result of disagreements regarding the imminent takeover of the company by DFDS. This has been the first ever incident which has seen the implementation of Phase 4 of Operation Stack, which involves closing the M20 from Junctions 9 to 11 coast-bound, meaning that continent-bound HGV traffic was stacked all the way from Junction 8 at Hollingbourne, southeast of Maidstone, to Junction 12 at Cheriton, near Folkestone. Operation Stack began to be removed from 3 July onwards, with more than 30 miles of parked HGVs needing to be cleared. The cost to the United Kingdom economy was estimated at around £250 million.

Over 4,600 HGVs were eventually cleared from the M20 by 4 July, however soon afterwards Phase 2 was implemented again for Eurotunnel freight traffic, due to over 150 migrants storming the Calais tunnel portal. This was as a result of the ongoing migrant crisis in Calais. The incident demonstrated that insufficient organisation and security at Eurotunnel, and port facilities throughout Calais was present to keep the desperate migrants under foot. Operation Stack resumed later during the month. Damian Collins, MP for Folkestone and Hythe complained the problem was too large for Kent County Council to deal with and met with the Home Secretary, Theresa May for discussion.

=== 2020 ===
In December 2020, France closed its borders with the UK during the COVID-19 pandemic due to concerns about the spread of a new variant of coronavirus. This caused major disruptions in ferry and Eurotunnel train traffic.

=== Operation Brock ===
On 28 October 2019, the Operation Brock traffic management plan became live. Operation Brock, in effect supersedes Operation Stack as a contingency allowing the M20 to be kept "open in both directions for all other traffic, minimising any impacts on local residents, businesses and public services". Work began in May 2018 on this scheme managed by National Highways (then Highways England), originally designed as a temporary solution to manage lorry queueing and traffic flow at the Port of Dover after Brexit.

In September 2018, National Highways (then Highways England) revealed in a freedom of information request that "Operation Brock, the code name for the management of freight in a no-deal scenario, would not be automatic and would require steel barriers to make a planned contraflow system on the M20 safe for ordinary vehicles" and that "£30m has been allocated to cover the design, build and initial operation of the scheme for up to six months."

As of March 2022, Operation Brock remains the traffic management plan for the Port of Dover and the Eurotunnel. National Highways says, "the Operation Brock contraflow system is designed to keep traffic on the M20 and other roads in Kent moving when there is disruption to travel across the English Channel".

== Alternatives ==
Several other options have been considered:

- Parking the lorries on the Kent County Showground at Detling has been discussed by Highways England, but locals are opposed because the area is very congested.
- In 2005, the Dover Harbour Board unveiled a plan to create a lorry park for 1,500 vehicles with construction beginning in 2006.
- In February 2007, it was revealed that Kent County Council had been talking to landowners about buying land for a lorry park.
- There has been a suggestion from Folkestone and Hythe District Council for a lorry park to the north-east of the roundabout at Junction 11, which would be supported by development in the Stanford and Lympne areas.
- A coned contraflow system has been trialled on the 10.5 miles (16.9 km) section between Ashford and Maidstone, to relieve the pressure on the A20, but it was costly and slow to arrange, taking two days to set up and two days to remove. Highways England have announced a plan to use quick movable barriers to set up a contraflow so that two lanes can be maintained.
- Use of part of the car park at Ebbsfleet International railway station to temporarily park/queue up to 1,000 lorries
- In July 2016 the Department for Transport announced that a new lorry park for 3,600 vehicles was to be built to the north of junction 11 of the M20, with new access from the eastbound motorway between junctions 10 and 11 at Stanford West, with completion expected by Summer 2017. However, in November 2017 the Department announced that "environmental obligations" had delayed this option and, instead, a linear lorry park along the centre of the M20, separated by traffic barriers, was under consideration.
- Manston Airport is under consideration as an overflow lorry park, with a convoy of lorries testing the feasibility of the 20-mile (32 km) route to Dover along the A256 on 7 January 2019.

== Other ports ==
=== Felixstowe ===
When the port of Felixstowe is closed, lorries are parked on the old A45 at Levington. They used to be parked on the A14 but this was deemed to be too dangerous for other road users. This is implemented when winds exceed 45 miles per hour (72 km/h) as the cranes cannot be operated due to Health and Safety regulations.

=== Stranraer ===
When the ports of Cairnryan and Stranraer are closed, lorries are parked on the closed A751.
