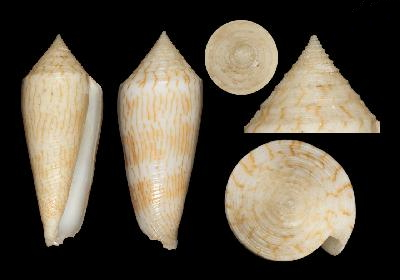
- Shells of Conus aito (holotype at MNHN, Paris)

Scientific classification
- Kingdom: Animalia
- Phylum: Mollusca
- Class: Gastropoda
- Subclass: Caenogastropoda
- Order: Neogastropoda
- Superfamily: Conoidea
- Family: Conidae
- Genus: Conus
- Species: C. aito

Binomial name
- Conus aito Rabiller & Richard, 2014

= Conus aito =

Species of sea snail

Conus aito, common name Paladin cone snail, is a species of sea snail, a marine gastropod mollusc in the family Conidae, the cone snails, cone shells or cones.

This snail is predatory and venomous and is capable of stinging humans.

== Description ==
The shell is medium-sized to moderately large and solid, with a narrowly conoid-cylindrical shape topped by a straight-sided spire of moderate to elevated height. The length of the shell attains 57.5 mm (2.26 in); the holotype measures 57.5 mm × 22.4 mm (2.26 in × 0.88 in).

The protoconch of the holotype is too damaged to determine with certainty whether its development is multispiral or paucispiral, although it appears to be probably paucispiral; its base is smooth and coloured white to greyish-white. The seven post-nuclear whorls are strongly tuberculate, with a flat sutural ramp bearing four spiral grooves; their colour is white with thin, axial yellow stripes. The straight-sided spire, of relatively elevated height, comprises twelve whorls on the holotype. Each whorl shows a deep and wide suture, with a flat to slightly concave sutural ramp ornamented with four spiral grooves and a kind of sub-sutural ridge along its base. Strongly tuberculate towards the protoconch, the late teleoconch whorls become increasingly smooth; if the tubercles do not disappear on the late whorls, the yellow stripes become increasingly visible. The shoulder is angulate and weakly nodulose.

The body whorl shows a narrowly conoid-cylindrical shape, with straight edges from the anterior end to the shoulder. The spiral grooves over the entire body whorl are very thin, and the encircling, spaced-out lines become more frequent and visible towards the base of the shell. The basic tint of the body whorl is a glossy ivory, ornamented with numerous interrupted, dark-yellow axial lines. The highest density of coloured axial lines forms two spiral bands, situated on each side of the centre of the body whorl. The pale lilac aperture is slightly wider at the base; the anal canal is quite large, channelled and lightly separated from the glacis of the sutural ramp.

== Taxonomy ==
Conus aito was described in 2014 by Michaël Rabiller and Georges Richard from material dredged during the TARASOC expedition (2009) to French Polynesia. The type locality is Niau Atoll, in the Tuamotu Archipelago. The holotype is deposited in the Muséum national d'histoire naturelle, Paris (registration number MNHN-IM-2000-27551), collected at TARASOC station DW3369 at a depth of about 466 m (1,529 ft); paratypes are known from Kaukura Atoll (station DW3370, about 327 m (1,073 ft)), Tikehau Atoll (station DW3387, about 575 m (1,886 ft)) and the island of Tahiti (station DW3484, about 475 m (1,558 ft)).

In the alternative classification of cone snails proposed by Tucker & Tenorio (2013), the species is placed in the subfamily Puncticuliinae of the family Conidae, in the genus Asprella (as Asprella aito).

== Distribution ==
This marine species of cone snail occurs off French Polynesia: in the Society Archipelago, off the island of Tahiti, and in the Tuamotu Archipelago, at the atolls of Kaukura, Tikehau and Niau. All specimens known to date were collected dead (empty shells) in depths going from about 300 down to 600 m, corresponding to the bathyal zone.
