= International Inbound Travel Association =

The International Inbound Travel Association, formerly known as the Receptive Services Association of America, is a 501(c)6 trade association of major North American–based receptive tour operator companies and suppliers (hotels, restaurants, attractions, destination marketing organizations, etc.). Based in Lexington, Kentucky, IITA is the only association focused solely on international inbound travel to the United States.

== Membership ==
The association has several membership categories for various travel and tourism industry sectors:

- Inbound Tour Operators are travel organizations (for example, receptive tour operators, destination management companies, or incentive management companies) with offices in the United States deriving more than 75% of their annual revenue from inbound tourism services to the United States.
- Tour Operators are domestic or international companies with packaged product to the United States promoted via brochure, website or other electronic means. These companies do not currently meet the requirement of 75% of revenue coming from international business.
- Associate Members are destination marketing and management organizations (including international, national or subnational bodies, state or provincial tourism offices, convention and visitors bureaus, and chambers of commerce). They promote cities, regions, states, or the whole United States as a travel destination. They provide travel services (transportation, restaurants, attractions), link to other organizations engaged in selling products and services to Inbound Tour Operator Members, and other organizations with an interest in international inbound travel, like government agencies, educational institutions, travel trade associations, and travel trade media.
- Industry Service Providers provide non-travel goods and services used by Inbound Tour Operator or Associate Members in conducting normal business activities. These goods and services may include accounting, legal printing, insurance, advertising, technical, and similar other goods and services.
- Sustaining Members are leading tour suppliers (Associate Members) that comprise the Advisory Board, which provides advice and input to the association's elected Board of Directors.

== History ==
Beginning as RSA in 1991, RSAA formed to associate major receptive tour operators and suppliers in the New York and New Jersey region. As a result of continuing interest and growth from across the country, RSA grew into a national organization.

RSA joined forces with ITSA, the International Travel Services Association to form RSAA in September, 2004. ITSA was formed and founded in 1993, by receptive tour operators and destination management companies to create a united voice to address issues of importance, educational opportunities, and networking with new business partners.

In 2012, RSAA became the first travel association to enter into a strategic partnership with the U.S. Commercial Service. This partnership helped RSAA and the U.S. Commercial Service promote travel to the United States and enable international operators to form relationships with U.S. receptive operators.

Today, IITA is involved in a wide range of industry activities, focusing on working with suppliers, regulatory agencies and travel promotion bureaus to improve the quality of travel related services for foreign visitors. IITA also addresses economic and public policy issues affecting tourism at local, state, and federal levels.

Furthermore, international tour operators, as well as international entities that promote travel to the United States, are eligible for membership in IITA. More than ever, IITA serves as the bridge to international inbound business and is committed to serving the needs of its members and to advancing the industry as a whole.

== Events ==
The largest annual event is the IITA Summit. IITA inbound tour operators, suppliers and industry service providers from across the country gather in a new location each year for the opportunity to learn about current happenings in the industry, strategically plan for the year, and network.

In addition to Summit membership events are held quarterly in various destinations. These events are open to members and those interested in learning more about the association.

== Inbound International Travel ==
The international inbound travel industry brings in 75 million visitors with $175 billion in spending annually.

IITA represents the major inbound operators in the United States who inbound package tour business in the United States.

IITA also addresses economic and public policy issues affecting tourism at local, state, and federal levels. It is interested in building awareness of the unique role receptives play in linking suppliers from all parts of the United States with the global travel industry.

== Governance ==
The chairman of the association is Gary Schluter of Rocky Mountain Holiday Tours and the executive director is Lisa Simon, former president of the National Tour Association. IITA offices are located in Lexington, Kentucky. The association is governed by a board of directors that consists of 16 members, supported by an Advisory Board currently consisting of 16 suppliers. The association is managed by Associations International.

On August 22, 2011, RSAA announced that it had formed a strategic partnership with VISIT USA - Europe.

On April 12, 2012, the association changed its bylaws to create an international membership class.

In February 2016, RSAA re-branded as the International Inbound Travel Association (IITA) and launched their new website inboundtravel.org.

== See also ==
- Caribbean Tourism Organization
