= Tauck =

Guided travel company

- Company type: Private
- Industry: Tourism
- Founded: 1925; 101 years ago
- Founder: Arthur Tauck
- Headquarters: Wilton, Connecticut, United States
- Key people: Arthur Tauck, Jr. (Chairman)
- Website: www.tauck.com

Tauck (/taʊk/) is an operator of guided tours and cruises and is based in Wilton, Connecticut. Founded in 1925, the company offers guided land journeys, small-ship ocean cruises, European river cruises, safaris, and family travel experiences. These tours take place in 70 countries and on all seven continents.

== History ==
Tauck was founded in 1925 by Arthur Tauck, Sr.

In 1958, Arthur Tauck, Sr. was succeeded by his son, Arthur Tauck, Jr., who expanded the company by adding additional domestic and international destinations.

== Today ==
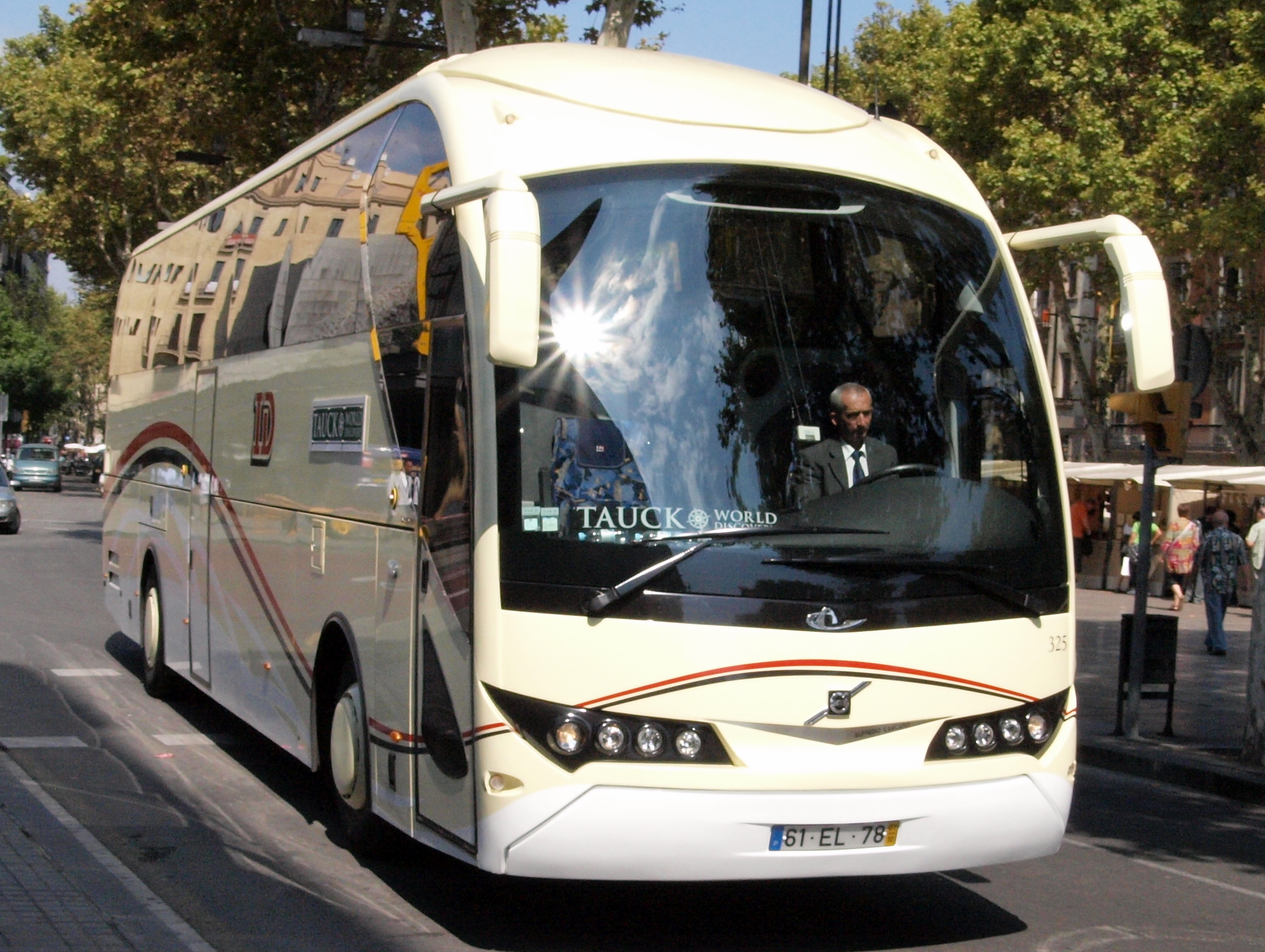
Tauck World Discovery in Barcelona, Spain

Today, Tauck offers over 150 guided journeys to over 70 countries and on all seven continents. Travel categories offered by Tauck include land journeys, European river cruises, small ship ocean cruises, and individual family travel adventures and special events.

Tauck is a member of the United States Tour Operators Association, and the National Tour Association.

=== Ken Burns Partnership ===
In September 2010, Tauck announced a partnership with the documentary filmmaker Ken Burns and his longtime collaborator Dayton Duncan to tailor land journeys and special events to topics covered in Burns’ films, including the Civil War, America's national parks, jazz, and baseball.

The partnership had several components:

- Tours designed by Tauck, Burns and Duncan, including itineraries exploring New England, New York's Hudson Valley, Yosemite National Park, Yellowstone National Park in wintertime, and the parks of the U.S. Southwest.
- Themed events in which Burn himself delivered a keynote address. Subjects included the history of New York City, the cultural roots of Chicago, jazz in New Orleans, and baseball in Cooperstown, NY.
- Original short films produced by Burns and Duncan that provide their perspectives on people and places featured in their documentaries, while travelers are visiting the areas under discussion. Ken Burns created a film specifically on the history of Tauck, called Tauck: An American Story.

== Awards ==
- 2021:
  - Travel + Leisure magazine: World’s Best Tour Operators, and the World’s Best River Cruise Lines.
  - Conde Nast Traveler magazine: Readers’ Choice Awards lists of the world’s best tour operators and river cruise lines.
- 2020:
  - Travel Weekly magazine Readers Choice Awards:
    - Best Tour Operator: Domestic Escorted
    - Best Tour Operator: International
  - Travel Pulse silver-level award in the Best Escorted Tour Operator, Family category.
- 2019:
  - Luxury Travel Advisor magazine: Best Luxury Escorted Tour Operator
  - AFAR magazine Travelers’ Choice Awards: Cultural Trips category
