= Manston Airport =

Former airport in Kent, England

Manston Airport (MSE)
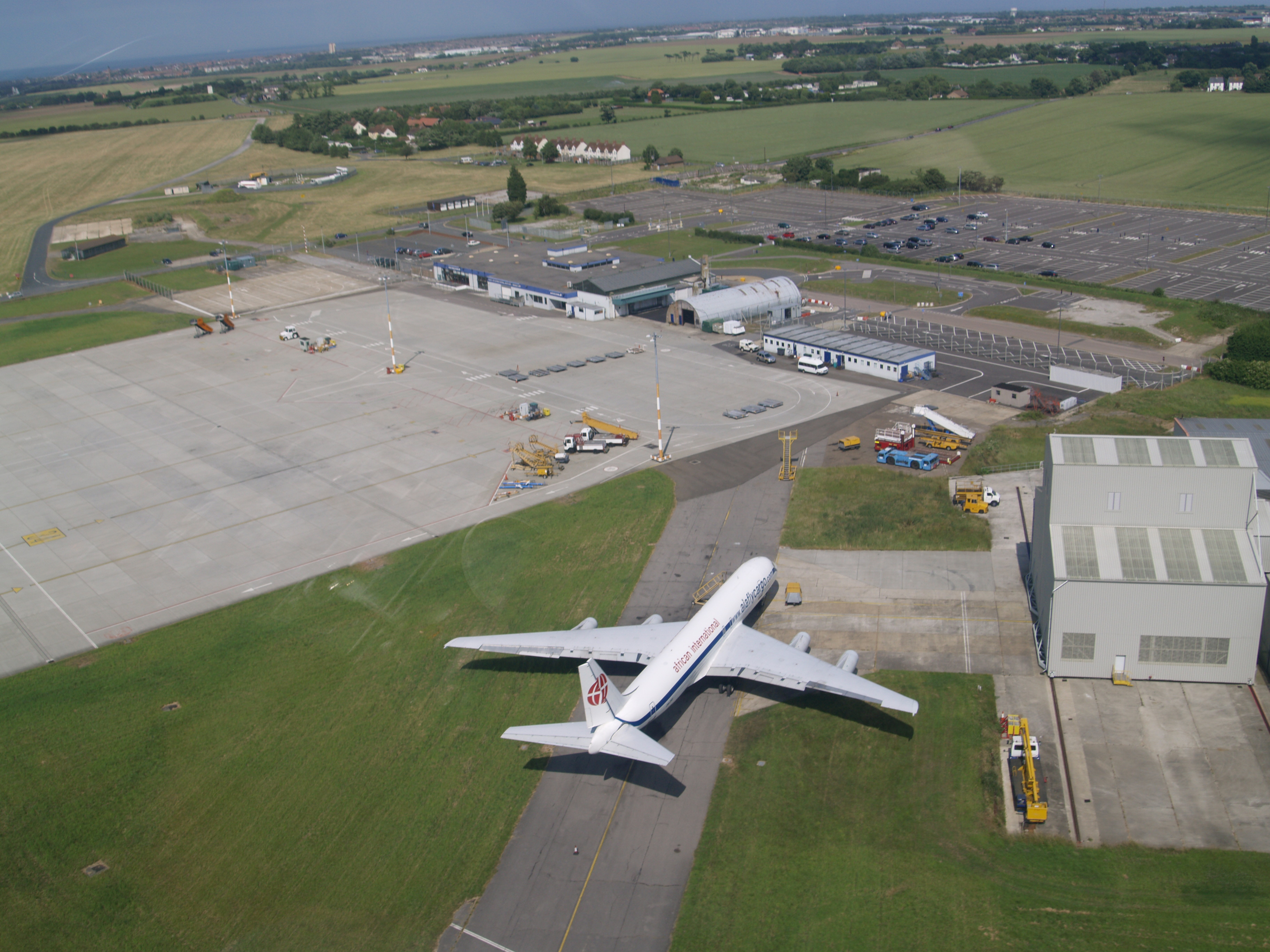
- IATA: MSE; ICAO: EGMH

Summary
- Airport type: Public
- Owner: RiverOak Strategic Partners Limited (July 2019)
- Location: Manston, Kent, England
- Closed: 15 May 2014
- Built: 1916
- Elevation AMSL: 178 ft (54 m)
- Coordinates: 51°20′32″N 001°20′46″E

Map
- Location

Runways
Direction	Length		Surface
Direction	m	ft	Surface
10/28	2,748	9,016	Asphalt concrete

Statistics (2014-until closure)
- Movements: 6,494
- Passengers: 12,508
- Sources: Statistics from the UK Civil Aviation Authority

Manston Airport (IATA: MSE, ICAO: EGMH) is a closed international airport in England. Originally operated as RAF Manston, from 1916, it has also operated as a commercial airport and was known as Kent International Airport and, briefly, London Manston Airport. It ceased scheduled aircraft services in 2014 and is set to reopen in 2028. It is located in the parish of Minster-in-Thanet and partly adjacent to the village of Manston in the Thanet district of Kent, England, 11 NM (20 km; 13 mi) north-east of Canterbury.

The single runway is located about 1 mile (1.6 km) from the coastline at 178 ft (54 m) above sea level.

It has the 11th-longest civilian runway in the United Kingdom (after Heathrow's two runways, Gatwick, Birmingham, Manchester, Stansted, East Midlands, Doncaster, Prestwick and Belfast International), 2,748 m (9,016 ft) in length. When operational, Manston was capable of handling some of the larger long-haul aircraft, but the runway was not long enough for the largest passenger or freight types at their maximum take-off weights. The runway was originally built with three "lanes" during the Second World War to handle emergencies, and is among the widest in Europe.

Since its closure, the airport has been used as an emergency lorry park in the event of temporary cross-Channel traffic problems, a filming location, including for the 2023 Sam Mendes film Empire of Light and has hosted a variety of aviation events, including the 2023 British Open Paramotor Championships and a general aviation fly-in event (May 2023).

Since 9 July 2019, Manston has been owned by RiverOak Strategic Partners and is the subject of a Development Consent Order to be reopened as an airfreight hub. The DCO was granted by the Secretary of State for Transport in July 2020 and again in August 2022, with the final legal challenge to the DCO dismissed in May 2024. The owners of the airport propose to reopen the airport for air cargo flights in 2028.

== History ==
=== Origins ===
At the outset of the First World War, the Isle of Thanet was equipped with a small and precarious landing strip for aircraft at St Mildred's Bay, Westgate-on-Sea, on top of the chalk cliffs, at the foot of which was a promenade which had been used for seaplane operations. The landing grounds atop the cliff soon became the scene of several accidents, with one plane failing to stop before the end of the cliffs and tumbling into the sea, which, fortunately for the pilot, had been on its inward tide.

In the winter of 1915–1916, early aircraft began to use the open farmlands between Minster and Manston as a site for emergency landings. The Admiralty Aerodrome at Manston was opened in response. A training school, originally set up to instruct pilots in the use of the new Handley Page Type O bombers, was soon established. By the close of 1916, there were already two units stationed at Manston: the Operational War Flight Command and the Handley Page Training School.

Its location near the Kent coast gave Manston some advantages over other aerodromes, and regular additions in men and machinery were soon made, particularly from RAF Detling, in early days. By 1917 the Royal Flying Corps was well established and taking an active part in the defence of Britain.

=== Battle of Britain and the Second World War ===
Manston was used as a forward base by many squadrons during the Second World War, owing to its location close to the front line. It was frequently attacked and heavily bombed during the Battle of Britain. Barnes Wallis used the base to test his bouncing bomb on the coast at nearby Reculver, prior to the Dambusters raid.

Hawker Typhoon and Gloster Meteor squadrons were based at Manston during the war. On 27 July 1944, RAF 616 Squadron became the first allied jet equipped squadron in the world to become operational, using Meteors to intercept German V-1 flying bombs aimed at London. Manston's position close to the front line and its long and broad three lane runway (built during the war, along with the runways at Woodbridge and Carnaby near Bridlington) meant the airfield was heavily used by badly damaged planes that had suffered from ground fire, collisions, or air attack. The airfield became a "graveyard" for heavy bombers and less-damaged aircraft, offering spare parts for allied aircraft in need of repair. The museum on site displays some aerial views dating from this era and the post-war years.

=== Post-war military and civil use ===
During the Cold War of the 1950s, the United States Air Force used Manston as a Strategic Air Command base for its fighter and fighter-bomber units. The USAF withdrew from Manston in 1960, and the airfield became a joint civilian and RAF airport, employed for occasional package tour and cargo flights, alongside its continuing role as an RAF base. Air Cadets used the northern side of the airfield as a gliding site, and an Air Experience Flight flying de Havilland Chipmunks was based there. Manston was used as a diversionary airfield for emergency military and civilian landings.

Manston became Kent International Airport from 1989, and a new terminal was opened by Sarah, Duchess of York. Summer season charter flights operated by Dan-Air to Palma, Mallorca were introduced on Saturdays, using BAC One-Elevens. The Yugoslavian carrier Aviogenex operated regular charters to the then-popular beach resorts of the then Yugoslavia on behalf of the now defunct Yugotours.

Kent International Airport was initially a 38-acre (150,000 m^{2}) civilian area within the former RAF Manston that included the existing terminal building and an apron where passengers embarked and freighters were loaded. The runway was not included within this enclave. In 1988, the owners of Kent International Airport signed a 125-year legal agreement with the RAF that obliged the RAF to maintain the runway, as well as to provide ongoing air traffic control and fire and rescue services. The cost of providing these was estimated at up to £3m per annum by the Ministry of Defence.

=== Sale and commercial operations ===
After an absence of regular charter services, Aspro Holidays operated a series of summer charter services during the 1992–93 summer season with its in-house airline Inter European Airways to Palma, Mallorca and Larnaca, Cyprus using the Boeing 737, and added a service to Heraklion, Crete, which was often operated using its larger Boeing 757 airliner. When Aspro was taken over by Airtours, the flights ceased. The early 1990s also saw weekly flights to Larnaca, Cyprus by Cypriana Holidays, with Eurocypria operating the inbound flight via Norwich as a split load. The service continued for approximately two summer seasons before Cypriana went into administration.

A 1993 report by the Department of Trade and Industry examined runway capacity in south east England and found Manston unsuitable for development as a major airport because of its proximity to a town. Nevertheless, in 1998, Thanet District Council produced the Isle of Thanet local plan, which recognised the economic development potential of abandoned sections of the old military airfield, particularly on its north-western edge. After the plan was published, the Ministry of Defence announced its intention to sell RAF Manston, and following a ruling by government instructing government departments to generate money through the sale of surplus assets, the MoD sold Manston.

After the RAF left, local Labour MP Stephen Ladyman opposed the decision to sell the base to property developer Wiggins Group plc. The RAF faced a compensation claim of £50–100 million if it then closed the base and terminated its earlier agreement with Kent International Airport. The MoD sold the site at the end of March 1999 for £4.75m to the Wiggins Group, which inherited the legal agreement obliging the RAF to continue maintenance of the airfield. Within six months, the RAF announced that it was leaving the airfield.

The airfield site comprises 700 acres (2.8 km^{2}).

=== Expansion ===
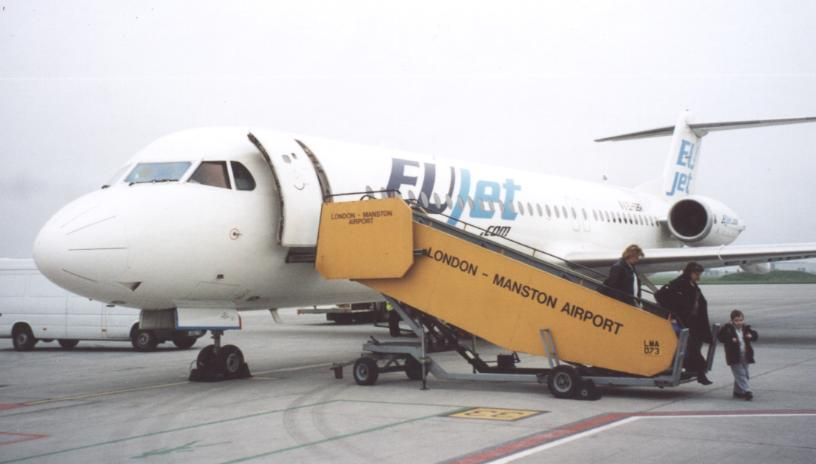
Fokker 100 of EUjet on arrival from Manchester on 31 March 2005

In December 2003 a Government White Paper on The Future of Air Transport stated that Manston "could play a valuable role in meeting local demand and could contribute to regional economic development", and would support development in principle, "subject to relevant environmental considerations".

Development began in 2004 in an attempt to make it a budget airline hub. Irish airline EUjet, formed in 2002, began scheduled flights in September 2004 to UK destinations such as Manchester, Edinburgh, and international destinations Dublin and Geneva with a small fleet of Fokker 100 airliners. New car parks and a direct coach service from Bluewater via Chatham were introduced to support these flights.

In May 2004, the airport operator PlaneStation bought 30% of the shares in EUjet, and in January 2005 it completed its takeover by acquiring the remaining 70%. On 26 July 2005, the airline went into administration and all EUjet flights ended, along with all non-freight operations at the airport, owing to financial difficulties with the airline and airport owner, PlaneStation. Its business plan was ambitious and when the bank lenders foreclosed many passengers were left stranded abroad. London Manston Airport plc went into liquidation. Operations then temporarily ceased, and Manston's aerodrome traffic zone and radar services were suspended, until after a new buyer could be found.

The sale of Manston to Infratil, a company based in Wellington, New Zealand and owner of Glasgow Prestwick Airport, was completed on 26 August 2005. In July 2006 a charter route between Manston and Norfolk, Virginia, was announced: it was cancelled prior to commencement because of low bookings. It was to be operated by tour operator Cosmos in conjunction with Monarch Airlines.

Luxembourg-based Cargolux started flying for Ghana Airways from Accra to Kent International on 17 April 2007.

Charter flights were operated from Manston by Seguro Travel Ltd, operating as Kent Escapes. The 2007 Kent Escapes flights were operated by Sky Wings using a McDonnell Douglas MD-80. Seguro then swapped operators on 16 August and flights were taken over by BMI for a period. At the end of the season, flights were operated by Futura International Airways, a Spanish-based airline, using the Boeing 737. Futura ceased trading during September 2008 and Seguro on 10 September 2008.

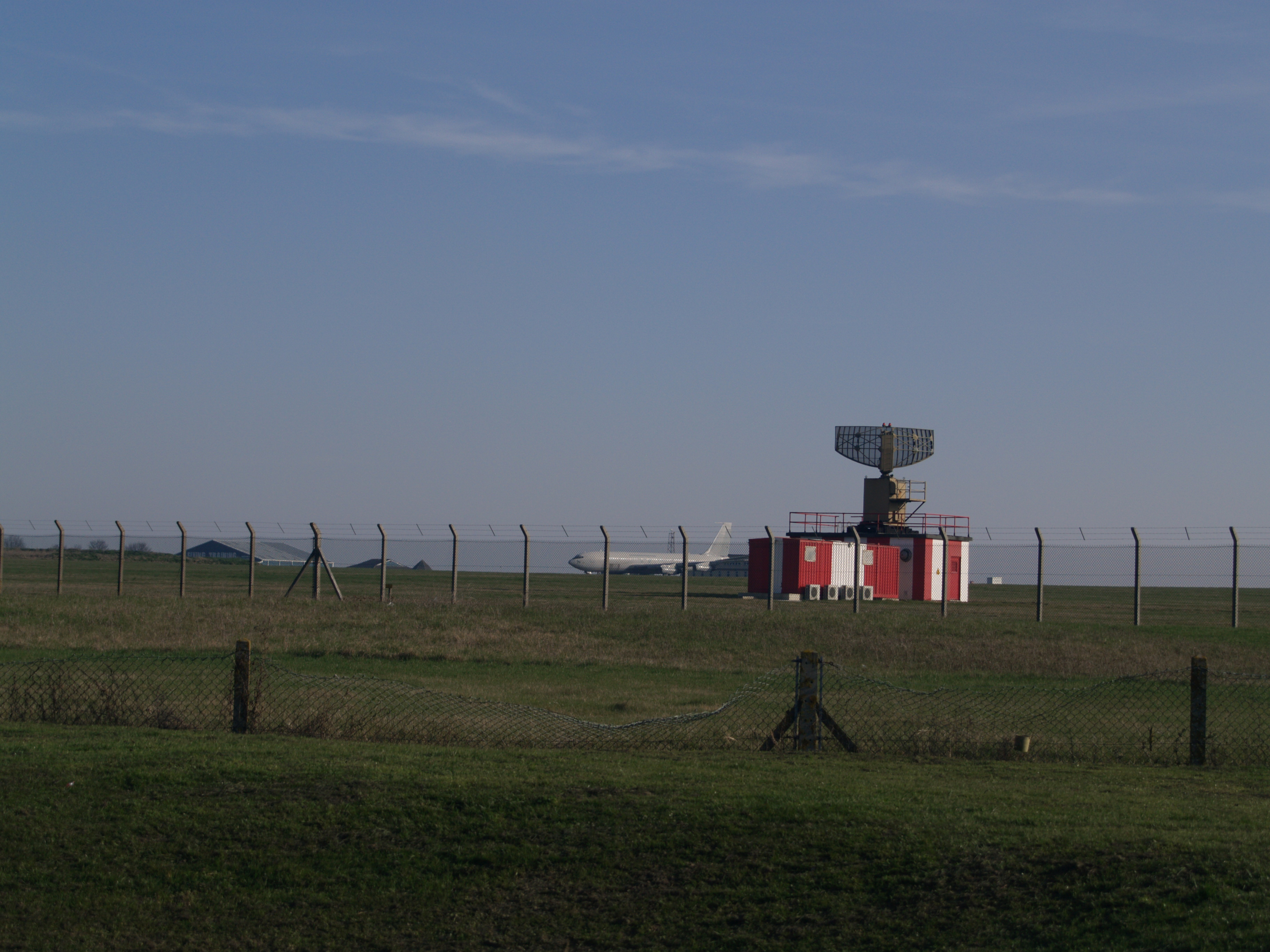
View across part of the airport

On 15 February 2010, former airport CEO Matt Clarke and Flybe head of PR Niall Duffy announced a daily service operated by Flybe from Manston to Edinburgh, Kirkwall, and Sumburgh, Belfast, and Manchester. The services were the first daily scheduled routes at Manston since the collapse of EUjet in 2005. Dash-8Q400 aircraft were used. Air Southwest announced seasonal charter services to Jersey every Saturday using Dash-8 aircraft. The Flybe services to Kirkwall and Sumburgh were operated by the once-daily flight to Edinburgh and then by Loganair to the onward destinations.

Departures were offered during summer 2011 to Funchal, Madeira with specialist operator Atlantic Holidays, operated by UK charter airline Monarch Airlines but then discontinued.

Newmarket Holidays continued to offer irregular charter flights during the summer months to Verona and Naples in Italy, as well as Porto in Portugal using the Lithuanian charter airline Small Planet Airlines for the summer 2013 season.

Iran Air used Manston as a fuel stop for flight 710 from Heathrow to Tehran due to fuel disputes in London, until 1 December 2011.

=== Decline ===
On 22 December 2011, Flybe spokesman Niall Duffy announced that all Flybe services would cease from Manston Airport by 25 March 2012.

On 8 March 2012, Infratil announced it would dispose of its European airport operations, placing Kent International and Glasgow-Prestwick airports up for sale. Manston and Prestwick had been running at a loss, and in May 2011 Infratil's annual report showed that losses from its European airports grew from £9 million to £11 million in 2010.

On 31 July 2012 a pressure group Why Not Manston? was formed, aiming to support greater use of Manston airport.

On 14 November 2012, KLM Royal Dutch Airlines announced twice daily flights from Manston to Amsterdam, with onward connections via the KLM network. The first flight was with a Fokker 70 on 2 April 2013.

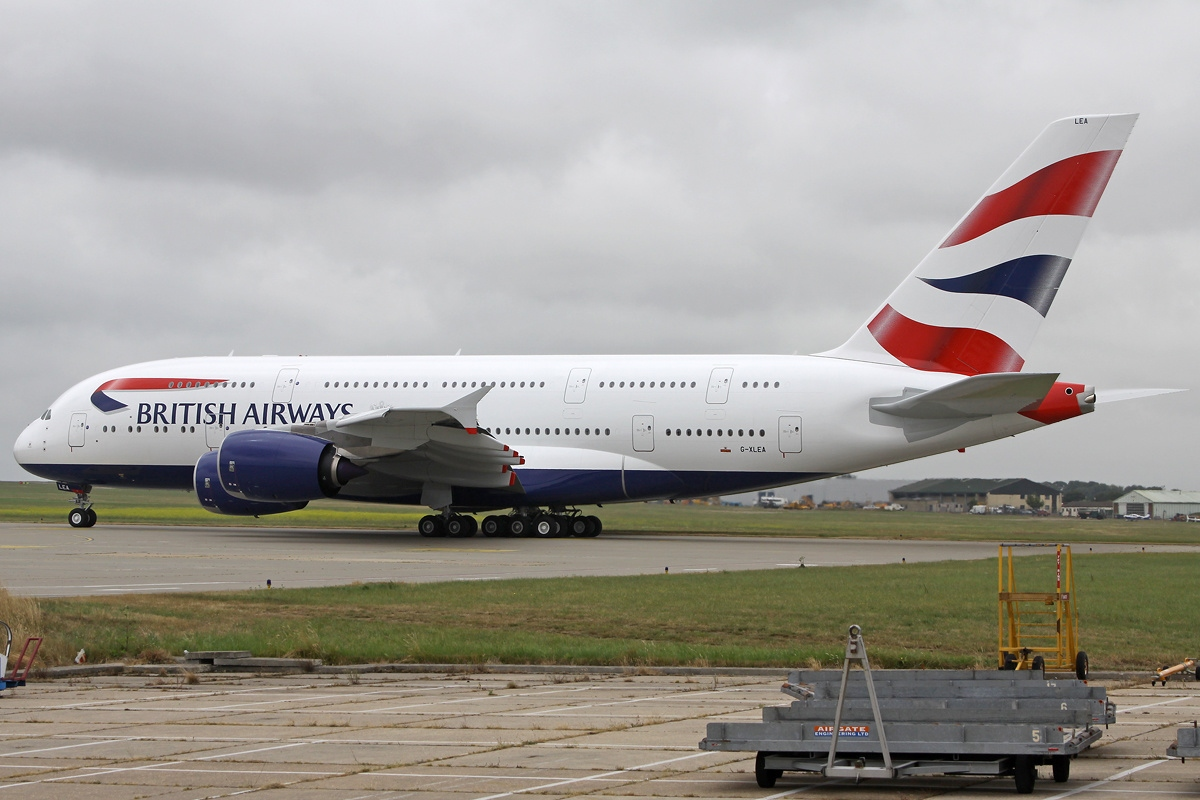
A British Airways Airbus A380 undergoing crew training at Manston

From July 2013, British Airways has operated test flights and crew training for the Airbus A380 from Manston, which was followed by a similar exercise for the Boeing 787 Dreamliner aircraft.

On 15 October 2013, Infratil announced it would sell the airport to a company wholly owned by Ann Gloag, co-founder of Stagecoach Group. Manston Skyport Ltd took over running the former airport on 29 November 2013.

=== Closure ===
On 19 March 2014, it was announced that a 45-day consultation period into the closure of the former airport had begun. Daily losses were said to be £10,000. The airport's chief executive announced that the airport could close on 9 April 2014, and on 25 March 2014 KLM Royal Dutch Airlines announced the end of its flights to Amsterdam by 10 April, and Manston's last scheduled flight departed for Amsterdam on 9 April 2014.

On 12 April 2014, Newmarket Holidays said its Verona and Naples seasonal charter flights would move to the expanding Lydd Airport.

The closure of the former airport was announced on 6 May 2014; this took place on 15 May 2014.

=== Lorry park ===
On 31 July 2015, it was announced that the site might be used to house overflow lorries from Operation Stack, an emergency procedure to be used when services across the English Channel, such as those through the Channel Tunnel or from the Port of Dover, were disrupted. To prevent lorries from parking on the motorway during busy periods, freight traffic bound for the Port of Dover might be diverted to the airfield and held until it can be directed to the ferry services.

On 26 October 2016, local newspaper the Thanet Extra reported that the owners of the site had received payments totalling £3.539 million from the Department for Transport to keep Manston Airport on standby as a lorry park for Operation Stack.

Manston was switched to Operation Brock, a plan for the event of a no-deal Brexit, when it superseded Operation Stack in 2019. In December 2020, the airport runway was used as a lorry park when the French border was closed to traffic from the UK due to a new strain of coronavirus being found there.

=== Future ===
In July 2019, it was announced the airport may restart operations by 2022, its new owner RiverOak Strategic Partners (RSP) had revealed. RSP, a London-based company incorporated in 2016 specifically to reopen the Kent airport, told the BBC it planned "short-haul and cargo flights" at the site. The company confirmed in a statement dated 3 July that it would purchase the airport from the then owners Stone Hill Park (SHP), which had originally planned to develop the area into housing, a business park, a country park, and sports village.

In August 2022 RSP announced that it had received the redetermined Development Consent Order, from the Department for Transport. Following proposed investment of £500 million it expected to restart flights in 2025. This was later revised to 2028, subject to funding.

== Redevelopment proposals ==
Following closure, a campaign was launched to reopen the airport, although the airport's owner stated its intention to redevelop the site.

In 2014, an American private equity group, RiverOak Investments, put forward a proposal to acquire the site and reopen it as an airport, with an initial emphasis on cargo and the recycling of aircraft. This would have required the local council to use a compulsory purchase order (CPO), with RiverOak as indemnity partner, covering the costs incurred. In a council cabinet meeting on 11 December 2014, the Labour-controlled cabinet decided not to proceed with a CPO at the present time, stating

"That no further action be taken at the present time on a CPO of Manston Airport, on the basis that the Council has not identified any suitable expressions of interest that fulfil the requirements of the Council for a CPO indemnity partner and that it does not have the financial resources to pursue a CPO in its own right".

RiverOak being the only candidate in the initial soft market testing, no further action was to be taken on the CPO until other suitable candidates had been sought through a further round of soft market testing. After a change in the control of the local council in the 2015 elections, the newly elected council decided to look again at using a CPO to re-open the former airport.

Subsequent to the DfT report commissioned from PwC, into the decision not to proceed, a second examination of RiverOak took place, following the suggestions made by PwC. RiverOak failed to provide the information required by the council to proceed with a CPO, leading TDC to decline to proceed with a CPO using RiverOak as indemnity partner for a second time.

In December 2015, it was announced that RiverOak would undertake a Development Consent Order (DCO) process to acquire permission from central government to reopen the airport. A pre-application enquiry was made to the Planning Inspectorate in January 2016.

In June 2016, the site owner submitted a planning application to Thanet District Council, seeking permission for 2,500 homes, commercial sectors and public parkland, under the name Stone Hill Park.

The Planning Inspectorate launched an inquiry into the proposed change of use of buildings on the site from aviation to non-aviation in July 2016. In August 2016, Thanet Council commissioned AviaSolutions, an aviation consulting firm, to conduct a study into the feasibility of the site reopening as an airport.

During August 2016, the developers of the proposed Stone Hill Park criticised RiverOak, stating a belief that the company would develop Manston into a "24/7 industrial scale cargo hub". This view was supported by a campaign group, No Night Flights, which also warned of daily and nightly flights to and from the airport. RiverOak subsequently made public a media statement discussing inaccuracies in the allegations by No Night Flights.

AviaSolutions released its findings in October 2016, stating that it did not believe an airport would be successful in the long-term on the site. RiverOak Strategic Partners responds to the Avia report saying that "basic factual errors and questionable methodology, together with a decision to ignore six respected and publicly available air freight studies, has led to a set of conclusions about Manston Airport that are unsafe for Thanet Council to rely on and therefore render the report unusable."

In November 2016, it was made public that Edi Truell, a leading city financier and previously the pensions and investments adviser to the then Mayor of London, Boris Johnson, was keen to acquire Manston and return it to an operational airport. That month, the date for the public inquiry was announced as 24 January 2017 after the previous meeting due 1 November 2016 was postponed.

In February 2017, it became public that Disruptive Capital, with Edi Truell as chairman was to commission a report on its plans for Manston Airport. After a response to the news by Stone Hill Park, Truell made public his team's investment in 14 airports around the world and $68 billion of long-term infrastructure investments.

In February 2017, RiverOak Strategic Partners spent its first day on site after gaining access to Manston Airport to carry out work as part of their development consent order (DCO).

In May 2017, it was announced that a new potential aviation investor was intending to approach Thanet District Council regarding a compulsory purchase order. Dale Crawford of DTD Consult is acting as spokesperson for the investment group, said to be a US logistics company with roots in Europe which already has plans to base 12 of its clients' aircraft at the site and able to invest over £100 million.

In July 2017 the Planning Inspectorate announced that, following its inquiry, it had thrown out the four applications for change of use of the Manston site to non-aviation uses.

In June and July 2017, almost 2,000 people attend statutory consultation meetings for RiverOak Strategic Partners' (RSP's) proposals for Manston Airport. A further round of statutory consultation events is held in January and February 2018

The Development Consent Order examination stage closed on 9 July 2019 and permission was given for the sale to go ahead. The Development Consent Order was granted by the Transport Secretary in July 2020 but quashed by the High Court in February 2021 due to insufficient explanation of reasons to go against a 2019 examining authority report.

In August 2022, the minister again approved the DCO to bring the airfield back into use. A spokesman from RSP stressed their aim was to build an airport which was net zero-carbon from the start, and that because of the great shortage of air-freight capacity locally, considering mixed mode operations as a whole, cargo flights to/from the airport would actually reduce CO_{2} emissions -- they claimed that most goods to/from SE England were trucked to French (and other nearby) airports for onward air freight. They said that once a plane was at its cruising altitude, it used less fuel than a set of trucks bearing the same goods by road, so if an item has to travel by air for some part of the journey, it is good to choose airports which minimise trucking distances.

In May 2024 a Judicial Review to challenge the reopening and redevelopment of Manston airport was rejected by the Court of Appeal in London which means that the DCO remains valid.

== Former airline operations ==
At the time of closure, (April 2014), there were various cargo services and one passenger service (KLM to Amsterdam) operating from Manston. Cargo flights before closure were operated by Cargolux to Johannesburg–OR Tambo, Luxembourg, Maastricht and Nairobi–Jomo Kenyatta; and by Saudia Cargo to Amsterdam, Dammam, Jeddah, Johannesburg–OR Tambo and Nairobi–Jomo Kenyatta.

== Non-passenger operations ==
Two museums, the RAF Manston History Museum and the Spitfire and Hurricane memorial, are located on the northern edge of the airfield.

Invicta International Airlines once had its head office on the airport property. The large hangar was originally built and used by Invicta; between 1987 and 2004 Modern Jet Support Centre Ltd used it for Boeing 707 and McDonnell Douglas DC-10 servicing, before entering administration; between 2006 and early 2009 it was used by airline DAS Air Cargo (which was taken over by Continental Aviation Services in November 2007) to maintain its aircraft as well as those of World Airways, Omni Air International, Gemini Air Cargo, and Avient Aviation, before entering administration. AvMan Engineering Ltd took over the hangar in 2009, and has CAA approval to work on BAe-146 and their ALF502 / LF507 engines.

A helicopter business (Helix Av) operates an FBO, maintenance and sales facility out of a hangar and associated building on the eastern portion of the airfield, also offering FBO services to fixed-wing aircraft.

A second helicopter business, Polar Helicopters, remains operational on the northern edge of airfield and provides a radio service for overflying aircraft.

== Search and rescue base ==
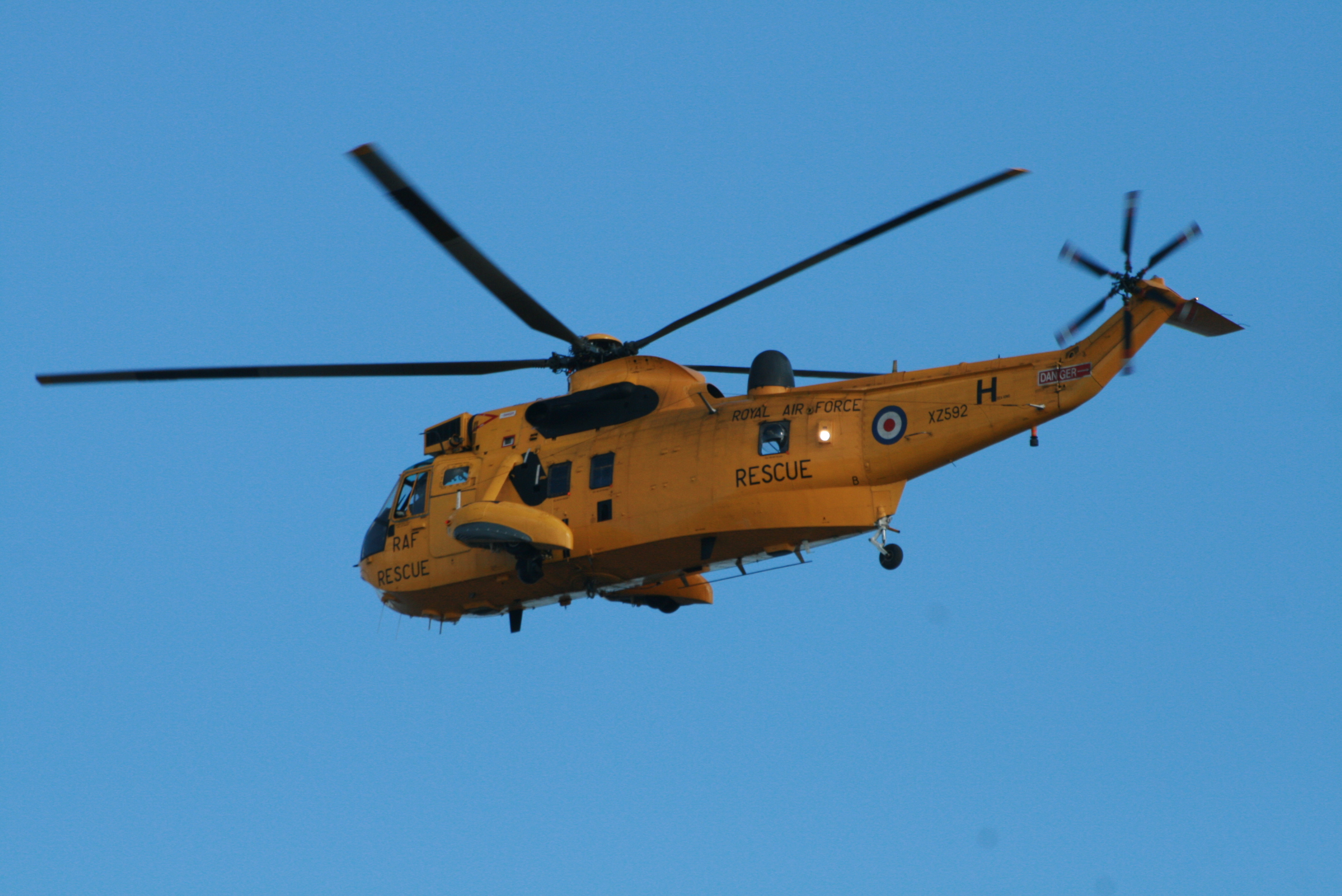
A Sea King HAR.3 of 202 RAF Squadron, who operated this type of aircraft from RAF Manston between 1988 and 1994

RAF Manston was home to a helicopter search and rescue (SAR) flight from No. 22 Squadron RAF from 1961, operating Westland Whirlwind HAR.2/HAR.10 aircraft. The flight was withdrawn in 1969, but an outcry led to the RAF contracting Bristow Helicopters from 1971 to 1974 to provide a continuing service (using Whirlwind Series 3s). In 1972, the Bristow crew was awarded the Wreck Shield for Most Meritorious Rescue in 1972 by the Department of Trade and Industry.

The RAF returned in 1974, with No. 72 Squadron RAF operating two Westland Wessex HC.2 aircraft to replace the Bristow operation. The flight was transferred back to No. 22 Squadron in June 1976. In 1988 No. 202 Squadron RAF moved to Manston with its Westland Sea King HAR.3, when the Wessex helicopters moved to RAF Coltishall. The Sea Kings remained at Manston until July 1994, when the SAR base closed, transferring SAR English Channel coverage to RAF Wattisham.

It was announced that Manston would be a location for the new 10-year SAR contract, operated by Bristow Helicopters on behalf of the Maritime and Coastguard Agency. Manston was intended to have a new £7 million, custom built facility operational from April 2015, hosting two new AgustaWestland AW189 helicopters. These plans were cancelled after the airport's closure was announced.

The Maritime and Coastguard Agency relocated SAR helicopter operations back to Manston from Lydd Airport in January 2026 in response to a dispute over fees with the operator of Lydd Airport. The unit operates two AgustaWestland AW139 helicopters from Hangar 3.

== Constraints ==
Manston's flight path passed over the town of Ramsgate, a seaside resort of some 40,000 residents, situated about 1 km (0.62 mi) from the eastern end of the runway. To one side of the runway lies the village of Cliffsend, whose housing is less than 200 m (660 ft) from it. Manston village stands to the northeast of the passenger terminal.

== Accidents and incidents ==
On 11 August 2010 a Douglas DC-8-63F YA-VIC of Afghanistan's Kam Air suffered a tailstrike on take-off, destroying an approach light. The aircraft was operating an international cargo flight from Manston to Buenos Aires via the Cape Verde Islands. The incident was caused by excess fuel, and an underestimation of the mass of the cargo, making the aircraft 25,700 pounds (11,700 kg) overweight. After being informed of the tailstrike, the crew continued the flight to the Cape Verde Islands. Inspection on arrival revealed that a tailstrike had indeed occurred, although the tailstrike indicator was within limits.

The incident was investigated by the Air Accidents Investigation Branch, which made four safety recommendations. As a direct result, Kam Air was banned from operating within the European Union. The three crew were dismissed, and Kam Air announced that it would withdraw its two DC-8s from service.

== See also ==
- Defence Fire Training and Development Centre
- List of Royal Air Force stations
- United States Air Force in the United Kingdom
- United States Air Forces in Europe
