= Linda Swain =

American television producer and host

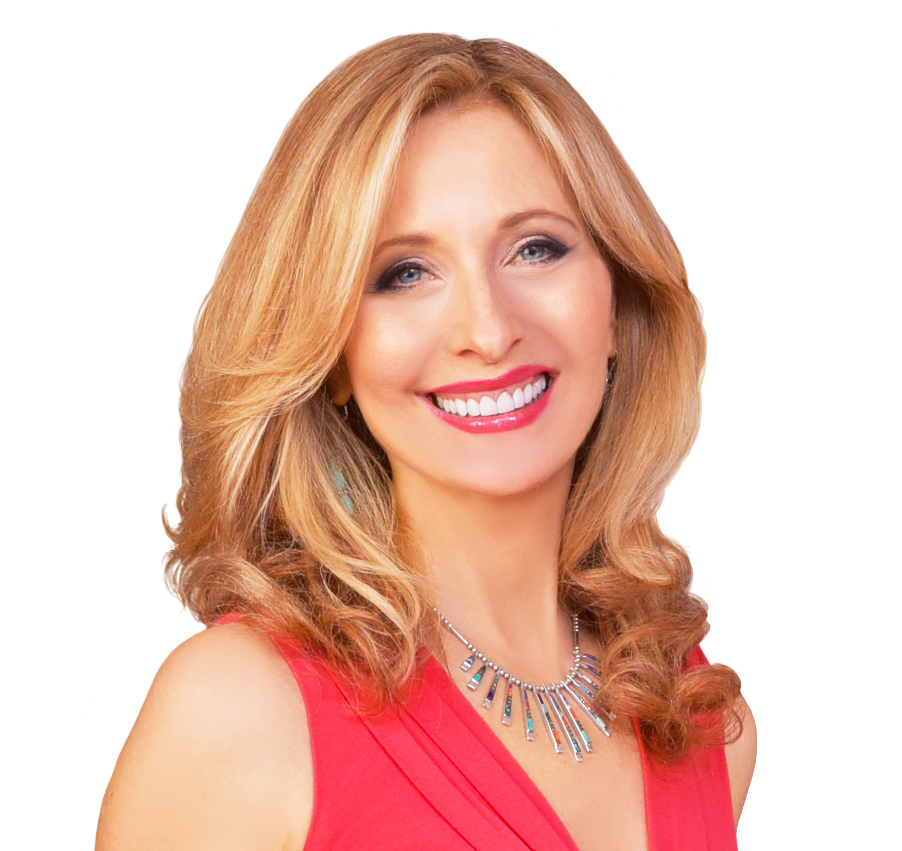
- Born: Linda Marie Prehatny; August 6, 1960 (age 65); Hampton, Virginia
- Education: Fordham University
- Occupations: Television Host and Producer, Songwriter
- Spouse: Ian Swain (1985 - present)
- Children: 6
- Parent: Dr. John R. Prehatny Helene Smith
- Website: www.lindaswain.com

Linda Swain (born August 6, 1960) is an American producer, television host and owner of Swain Entertainment, a creative content and production company. She is also co-founder of Swain Destinations, a travel company specializing in customized experiences to Australia, New Zealand, South Pacific, Africa and Asia which was established in 1987.

Her series, Tapping IN: The Happiest People and Places which explores the various ways people find happiness around the world was syndicated in over 80% of the U.S. television market on major network stations between 2015 and 2018 and received a Daytime Emmy Nomination for Outstanding Travel Program.

== Early life and education ==
Swain, the middle of five children, was born on Langley Air Force Base in Hampton, Virginia, to surgeon and professor of surgery, Dr. John R. Prehatny, and Helene Smith, a medical technician and homemaker. She was raised in the Philadelphia area for the majority of her childhood where she attended St. Margaret's and Archbishop John Carroll High School. From age 8-16, she studied classical piano with Dr. Andor Kiszely at the Main Line Conservatory of Music composed music and participated in piano recitals and Competitions.

Being a second generation American of Slovak and Tyrolian descent, her parents were active members of Holy Ghost Byzantine Catholic Church where she sang in the choir with her siblings, performed in the Church dance troupe and played the balalaika.

She is an alumna of Fordham University at Lincoln Center .

== Career ==
In 1987, Linda Swain co-founded Swain Destinations, a travel company specializing in customized travel to exotic locations, with her husband, Ian, who operate their family business to this day.

In 2002, Swain entered broadcasting with a series she created as a mother to six children for WCAU in Philadelphia called Moms on the Move . She featured stories of inspiring mothers on The 10! Show and Moms on the Move Half-Hour Specials until 2006 for which she received Emmy Awards for Outstanding Show Host and Producer.

Also, a musician and songwriter, Swain was the executive producer of the IMAX signature movie, Home of Freedom, which played before every IMAX feature movie at the Franklin Institute between 2002-2007. The movie was based on an anthem for the city Swain composed entitled, The Philadelphia Song. The composition was also used to promote tourism to the historic city and accompanied the city's New Year's Eve fireworks.

In 2006, Swain established Swain Entertainment and taped a series of half-hour Moms on the Move programs with a LIVE studio audience at QVC studios in West Chester, PA. They were syndicated nationally to 110 markets in the United States.

Leveraging her three decades of access to some of the most intriguing people and exotic places through Swain Destination, Swain went on to create a program that showcased how people find happiness around the world called, Tapping IN: The Happiest People and Places. The hour-long episodes launched in syndication in over 80% of the U.S. television market on major network stations in 2015. Her first show featuring Sydney, Australia and hometown, Philadelphia, earned a Daytime Emmy Nomination for Outstanding Travel Program. Swain signed an international distribution deal for Tapping IN in 2018.

== Awards ==
- Daytime Emmy Nomination for Outstanding Travel Program 2015 by the National Association of Television Artists
- Legacy Youth Tennis and Education Jerry Laroque Award 2012
- Visionary Award May 3, 2008 – Center for Advancement In Cancer Education
- Media Award Oct. 5, 2006 for Vision for Equality for raising awareness for people with disabilities and their families
- March of Dimes 2005 “Citizen of the Year”
- Emmy Award for Outstanding Show Host by the National Association of Television Artists of the Mid-Atlantic Region 2005-2006
- Emmy Award for Outstanding Program Feature 2005 by the National Association of Television Artists of the Mid-Atlantic Region in 2004-2005
- Pennsylvania's 50 Best Women in Business in 1997 by PA Business Journals
- Wharton School of Business' Top 100 Fastest Growing Companies 1995, 1996, 1997 by Philadelphia Business Journal

== Personal life ==
Linda met Australian native, Ian Swain, in New York City in 1984 and they were married in 1985 on the Gold Coast in Australia. Together they have six children, two from his previous marriage, and three grandchildren.

Swain has been an active in fundraising for children's charities and as a board member of Legacy Youth Tennis formerly Ashe Youth Tennis and Education since 1996.
