= Operation Brock =

Traffic management system to mitigate the effects of Brexit

Advanced warning traffic sign for Operation Brock.

Operation Brock is the traffic management system in Kent, England, used to supplement Operation Stack during cross-Channel traffic problems. It was originally developed for use in the event of a no-deal Brexit.

== Background ==
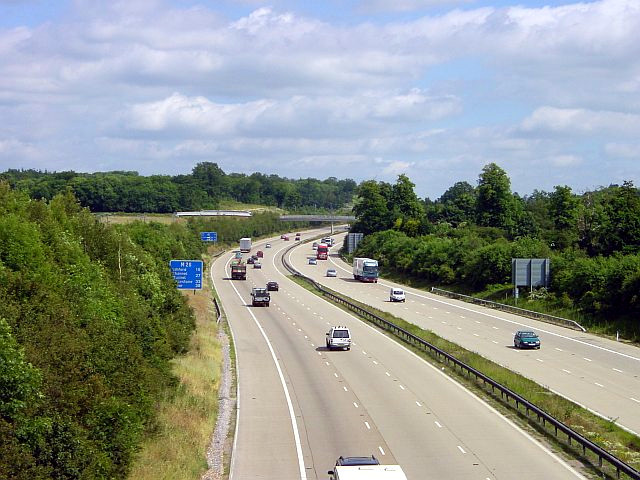
The M20 near Hollingbourne, within the Operation Brock area, in 2005.

The M20 runs between the M25 and Folkestone, with a section of the A20 dual carriageway making up the last few miles to Dover. Effectively the motorway has carried nearly all cross channel traffic to and from the Port of Dover and the Channel Tunnel since the late 1990s. When the ferries and/or shuttle trains were not running to schedule, lorries bound for the continent were parked on the motorway, under Operation Stack coupled with the more recent Dover Traffic Assessment Project (TAP), which meters or halts lorries but not other traffic on the A20 before they may enter the town. However, with the possibility of a higher administrative overhead at the Port of Dover post-Brexit and an increase in freight traffic, protocols needed to be strengthened and Operation Brock was formed.

Work began in May 2018 on this scheme managed by Highways England and in September 2018 they revealed in a Freedom of Information request that "£30m has been allocated to cover the design, build and initial operation of the scheme for up to six months." The works included strengthening the carriageways of the M26 and altering the carriageway of the M20 between Junctions 8 and 9. On the westbound carriageway of the M20, the hard shoulder was converted to a running lane, giving that carriageway a total of four lanes, all remarked with white lines. A steel barrier now separates these lanes, providing two in each direction.

Operation Brock was scheduled to be ready for activation no later than the date of the UK's exit from the European Union, 31 January 2020. Road marking reworkings began on or around the night of 26 October 2019.

== Phases ==
There are four phases of Operation Brock, each trying to cope with more traffic than the last.

=== Phase 1 ===
The initial phase only concerns heavy goods vehicles (HGVs) queuing for the Port of Dover. At this stage, Dover TAP is activated and all HGVs using the Port must use the A20 from Folkestone, queuing in the left hand lane. The road will be reduced to 40 mph and all other traffic will use the right hand lane. HGVs will be released in intervals at Western Heights Roundabout to the west of Dover, in order to avoid clogging up the only main road through the town.

=== Phase 2 ===
Phase 2 encompasses the contraflow between Junctions 8 and 9 on the M20 and now applies to HGVs for both the Port of Dover and Channel Tunnel. Both directions of motorway traffic are directed onto the westbound carriageway contraflow at a speed limit of 50 mph. The eastbound carriageway will then be closed and used for HGV queuing in two lanes (the hard shoulder and 3rd lane) with the other two lanes reserved for emergency vehicles, maintenance vehicles and amenities. This would be marked out with cones and subjected to a 30 mph speed limit. Due to the contraflow setup, non-HGV traffic cannot join the M20 eastbound at Junction 8.

=== Phase 3 ===
Phase 3 separates the HGVs for the Port of Dover and Channel Tunnel. All HGVs for the Channel Tunnel use the contraflow on the M20, whereas HGVs for the Port of Dover head to Manston Airport via the M2, A249 and A299 (advertised routes by Highways England). HGVs will queue here until space is made available on the A256, where the TAP256 will control HGVs in the same way the Dover TAP does on the A20.

=== Phase 4 ===
Phase 4 only affects HGVs for the Channel Tunnel. The M26 is now closed entirely and HGVs are parked on both carriageways until space at the contraflow on the M20 becomes available.

== Problems ==
In January 2019, a rehearsal for part of Operation Brock was carried out, using the former Manston Airport as a lorry park. It was criticised for being unrepresentative of the actual situation that would occur in reality. On the first day of the test, only 89 of the planned 150 lorries turned up for the rehearsal.

The contraflow has been the height of issues however. As Operation Brock was not used due to Brexit being delayed, the decision was made to partially revert the M20 back to its original state. This was done by reopening the eastbound carriageway fully, and keeping the steel barrier in the event that Operation Brock would have to be activated again in the following months due to the uncertainty of Brexit. The westbound carriageway has stayed at 50 mph. This has decreased safety to motorists travelling on the M20 whether Operation Brock is in force or not, as if they breakdown they are in a live lane and there are no warnings to other traffic like there are on Smart motorways. In the first few weeks of the contraflow being in force, many accidents happened on the stretch, and with no hard shoulder emergency vehicles found it hard to get to the scene.

== History ==
May 2018 – Highways England designed and built a temporary traffic management system that would implement a contraflow system using a rigid steel barrier separating traffic flows.

26 October 2019 – Barrier is installed.

January 2020 – The barrier is removed and works begin in designing a moveable barrier that can be implemented and removed at short notice.

September 2020 – Zipper barrier is installed.

11 December 2020 – Testing of the moveable barrier was carried out in preparation for 27/28 December 2020.

21 December 2020 – Barrier is moved into place and Operation Brock activated due to the French Border being closed as a result of Coronavirus. It was initially planned to move the barrier into place on 27/28 December.

25 April 2021 – Contraflow is removed and barrier is moved back to the shoulder.

28 January 2022 – Work, expected to take approximately 1 year, begins to move the barriers stored position from the hard shoulder to the central reservation. During this period lanes are closed in both directions on parts of the motorway between J8 and J9 but the contraflow is not normally used.

25 March 2022 – Operation Brock contraflow is activated after the P&O sacking of 800 staff incident as a precaution against disruption at Dover. Between 25 March and 6 April the coastbound M20 is completely closed with increasing frequency between J8 and J9, with the coastbound contraflow being used for HGV traffic management.

6 April 2022 – "Operation Brock Zero" is activated, extending the complete closure of the coastbound M20 to J11.

14 April 2022 – Operation Brock is scaled back, reopening M20 J10a to J11 and the coastbound contraflow to normal traffic.

6 June 2022 - Operation Brock is deactivated. Lane closures and speed limits are still in force between Junctions 8 and 9 to resume the previous works to move the barrier storage location.

== See also ==
- Operation Yellowhammer
- Operation Stack
