= Asprella =

Asprella may refer to two different genera:

- Asprella Schaufuss, 1869, a synonym for Conus, a genus of snails
- Asprella Schreb., a synonym for Leersia, a genus of grasses
