= ABTA (trade association) =

Travel and holiday companies of the United Kingdom

ABTA Limited
- ABTA – The Travel Association
- Abbreviation: ABTA
- Formation: June 1950; 76 years ago (original meeting); 30 June 1955; 71 years ago (legal incorporation)
- Legal status: Non-profit company
- Purpose: Travel agents and tour operators in the United Kingdom, UK-arranged foreign holidays, and consumer protection for package holidays
- Location: London, England
- Region served: UK
- Members: Around 1,200 companies with c. 5,000 travel agent branches and c. 900 tour operators
- Chief Executive: Mark Tanzer
- Main organ: ABTA Board of Directors (Chairman - Alistair Rowland) and ABTA Council of Regions
- Website: abta.com
- Formerly called: Association of British Travel Agents Limited

ABTA Limited (/ˈæbtə/, formerly the Association of British Travel Agents Limited) is a trade association for tour operators and travel agents in the United Kingdom.

== History ==
The organisation's first meeting was in June 1950, and was legally incorporated as the Association of British Travel Agents on 30 June 1955, by 22 leading travel companies. ABTA adopted its current name on 1 July 2007, reflecting its wider representation of the travel industry. On 1 July 2008 it merged with the Federation of Tour Operators (FTO).

In December 2022, ABTA announced a partnership with Eurochange to offer foreign exchange services under the ABTA brand.

== Function ==
ABTA has existed for over 70 years and is the UK's largest travel association, representing travel agents and tour operators that sell around £32 billion of holidays and other travel arrangements each year.

The main functions of ABTA are:

- Raising standards in the industry and by giving guidance on issues from sustainability to health and safety,
- Providing schemes of financial protection,
- Offering holidaymakers a course of redress if something goes wrong,

=== Code of conduct ===
ABTA maintains a code of conduct which governs the relationship between members and their customers, between members and ABTA, and between members and other members.

The code is essentially a guide to good practice, although some of what it contains is also required under UK and European law. Those booking travel arrangements with an ABTA member can expect to receive:

- Accurate information so holidaymakers can make informed choices
- Advice or assistance on passport, visa and health requirements
- An offer of a suitable alternative if there are building works that will seriously impair a holiday
- A refund of the holiday cost if there's a significant flight delay and the holidaymaker decides not to travel
- A response to any complaint raised within 28 days
- Resolution of complaints as quickly as possible and, if it can't be resolved amicably, the guaranteed option of arbitration to find a settlement.

All ABTA members have to abide by the code and those that breach it can face sanctions at ABTA's Code of Conduct Committee.

=== Consumer protection ===
==== ABTA ====
If a holidaymaker buys a land- or sea-based holiday such as coach, rail or cruise holiday from an ABTA member their monies will be protected by the ABTA scheme of financial protection. This means that if the travel company fails and the holiday can no longer go ahead the holidaymaker will be entitled to a refund if they are yet to travel and hotel costs and transport home if they are abroad.

In addition to financial protection, ABTA members are also bound to comply with the ABTA code of conduct, which ensures high service standards and fair terms of trading. Booking with an ABTA member also provides recourse should there be a problem or complaint with the travel company.

==== ATOL ====
ATOL stands for Air Travel Organisers’ Licence. It is a government-run financial protection scheme operated by the Civil Aviation Authority (CAA). All monies paid for package holidays involving flights and holidays including a flight plus accommodation and/or car hire, must be protected under an ATOL licence. Customers will receive an ATOL Certificate at the time of payment.

ATOL cover means that if a travel company fails and a holiday can no longer go ahead the customer will be entitled to a refund if they are yet to travel and hotel costs and flights home if they are abroad. Flights booked directly with an airline are not protected under the ATOL scheme.

ATOL is a financial protection scheme, it does not provide other assistance if there are other problems with a holiday.

When customers' money will be automatically protected:

- Packages. Packages offer the best form of protection. Not only are holidaymakers entitled to a refund or repatriation should their travel company go out of business, but they also benefit from additional legal protection should there be a problem with their holiday.
- Flight-Plus. This is where a flight is booked, along with accommodation and/or car hire to be used with it, from one company but they haven't packaged it together. These arrangements are financially protected, however, they do not provide the same legal protection as a package should there be a problem with the holiday.
- Charter flights.

== Structure ==
ABTA currently has around 1,200 members and represents over 5,000 retail outlets and offices. It is estimated that over £32 billion is spent on holiday arrangements with ABTA members every year, 90% of package holidays in the UK are sold through its members.

It has eleven regional divisions. The head office is situated near Vinopolis and Southwark Cathedral.

== Research ==
A 2018 report by ABTA claims that the majority of UK summer holidays abroad are to seven EU member states: Spain, France, Italy, Portugal, Greece, Cyprus and Malta. These seven countries generated 35 million visits by UK residents.

== See also ==
- International Air Transport Association (IATA)
- Association of Independent Tour Operators (AiTO)
- Confederation of Tourism and Hospitality
