= Association of Independent Tour Operators =

Travel trade association

AITO - The Specialist Travel Association
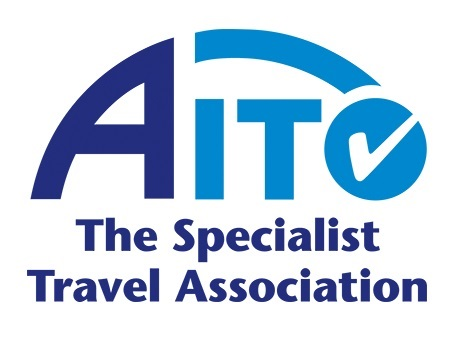
- Abbreviation: AITO
- Founded: 1976
- Location: Twickenham
- Region served: United Kingdom
- Website: www.aito.com

AITO – The Specialist Travel Association (formerly known as The Association of Independent Tour Operators), is a British-based travel industry trade association established in 1976 that represents around 120 specialist and independent tour operators. The current headquarters of the AITO are based in Twickenham, south-west London.

Members of AITO operate in over 170 countries, including the UK, with activities spanning a range of interests including adventure, city breaks, culture, fly drive, luxury, safaris and sports. The AITO also influences policy that affects consumers and travel industry; particularly initiatives related to independent tour operators.

== Membership ==
AITO members offer full protection of consumer holiday funds, a wide range of specialist holidays, quality customer service and a sustainable approach to travel. There are around 120 Tour Operator members, but around 250 members within the association including AITO Specialist Travel Agents, AITO Tourist Board Partners and AITO Business Partners.

To become a member, AITO tour operators must have consumer protection in place. Through this requirement, its Quality Charter and promotion of sustainable tourism and DEI initiatives, AITO upholds high standards within the travel industry.

== Quality Charter ==
As a requirement for membership, AITO Tour Operators must follow AITO's "Quality Charter". It covers the following measures of quality:

- Exclusive membership criteria
- Financially secure holidays
- Accurate brochures and web sites
- Professional service and continual improvements
- Monitoring standards
- Sustainable tourism
- Fair customer relations

== Sustainable Tourism ==
AITO has led several sustainable tourism (ST) initiatives in the past, notably a ST Star accreditation scheme which ceased in 2013.

In 2016 it revisited its Sustainable Tourism values and launched Project PROTECT. Standing for People, Resources, Outreach, Tourism, Environment, Conservation and Tomorrow. Project PROTECT was designed to protect the destinations members operate in. Each member of the association was required to make a pledge, which was reported at the end of the year. The 5-year programme was designed in partnership with the University of Surrey and Sustainable Tourism thought leader Professor Xavier Font. Progress and measurable change were monitored by AITO HQ, AITO Council, Prof Xavier Font and a PHD student from the University of Surrey. Project PROTECT concluded in 2020.

== AITO Awards ==
In February 2016, AITO launched its Gold, Silver and Bronze, Tour Operator of the Year Awards, awarded annually to those tour operators with the highest ratings on AITO's website. AITO also presents a series of travel writing awards annually, including Travel Writer of the Year (Under 1,500 Words), Travel Writer of the Year (Over 1,500 Words), Young Travel Writer of the Year and Blogger of the Year. The award winners are published at AITO Awards in October.

== 40th Anniversary ==
On Tuesday 23 February 2016, AITO celebrated its 40th anniversary at a special dinner at the Royal Horseguards Hotel in London. The special guest for the evening, Simon Reeve, the British author, television presenter and explorer gave the keynote speech and presented the annual awards.
