= United States Tour Operators Association =

- Industry: Travel
- Founded: 1972
- Headquarters: New York, New York
- Area served: North America
- Members: 143 (February 2024)
- Website: www.ustoa.com

United States Tour Operators Association (USTOA) is a 501(c) registered nonprofit professional association that represents the tour operator industry. Its members are made up of companies who provide services worldwide but who conduct business in the U.S.

== Overview ==
As a voice for the tour operator industry, USTOA represents this sector in matters pertaining to the travel industry as a whole, both in the U.S. and abroad. Among USTOA's goals are consumer protection and education, and its standards and work in this area have earned USTOA the endorsement of the United States Government's Consumer Action Handbook.

In 2022, USTOA, alongside other nonprofit associations within the travel industry such as ASTA and U.S. Travel, actively advocated for the elimination of the inbound pre-travel testing requirement imposed by the United States.

== Membership ==
USTOA's membership consists of companies that must meet a number of ethical and financial criteria, including participation in the USTOA $1 Million Travelers Assistance Program, which among other things protects consumer payments up to $1 million in case the company files for bankruptcy, insolvency or cessation of business. The association currently has a membership base of over 143 organizations, which encompasses a diverse range of companies such as Abercrombie & Kent, Adventures by Disney, The Travel Corporation USA, Viking Cruises, Windstar Cruises and WorldStrides.
