= Tour operator =

Economic activity

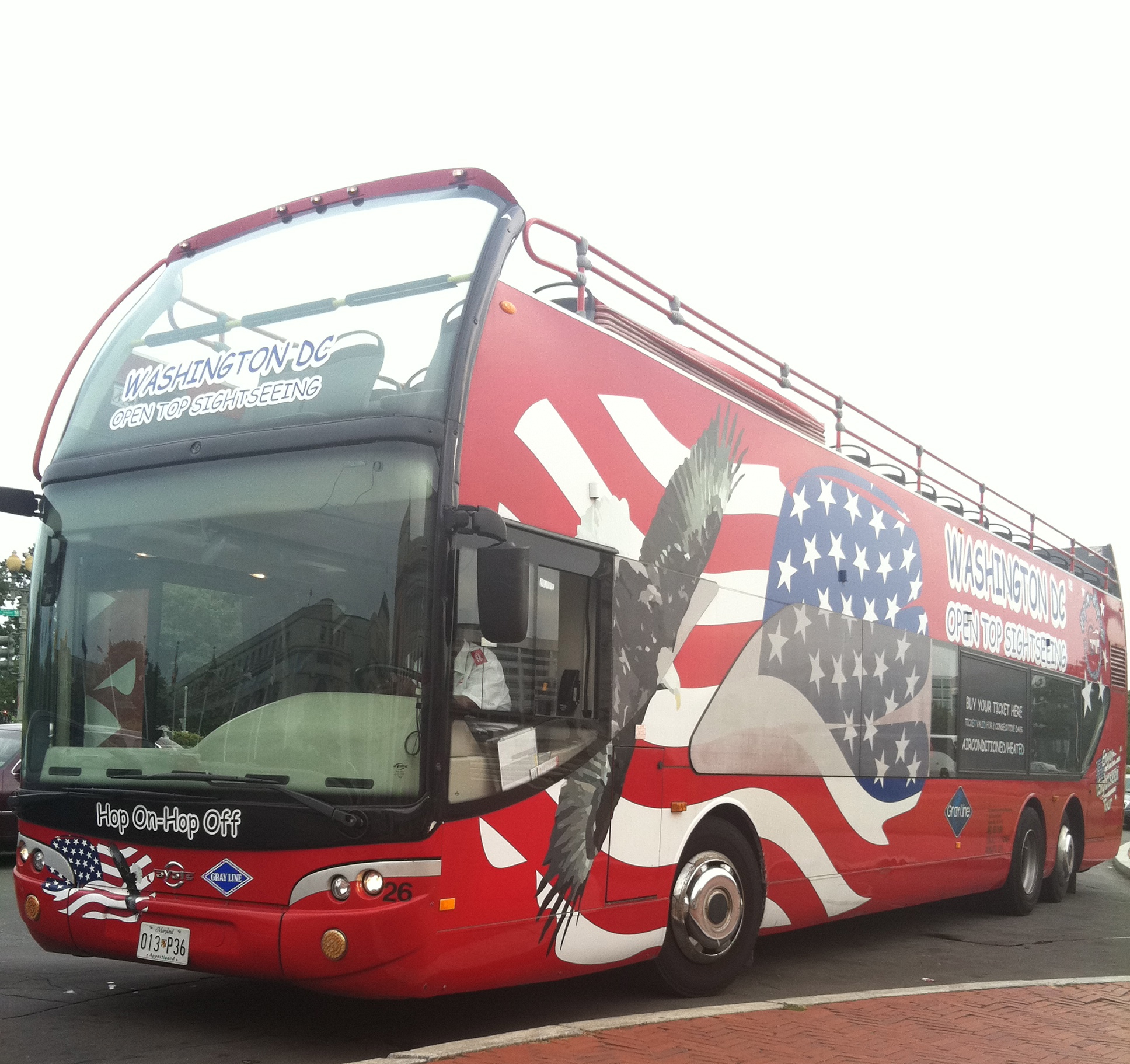
An open top double decker bus is used worldwide to provide sightseeing tours, such as this one in Washington, D. C., USA

A tour operator is a business that typically combines and organizes accommodations, meals, sightseeing and transportation components, in order to create a package tour. They advertise and produce brochures to promote their products, holidays and itineraries. Tour operators can sell directly to the public or sell through travel agents or a combination of both.

The most common example of a tour operator's product would be a flight on a charter airline, plus a transfer from the airport to a hotel and the services of a local representative, all for one price. Each tour operator may specialise in certain destinations, e.g. Italy, activities and experiences, e.g. skiing, or a combination thereof.

== Operations ==
The original raison d'être of tour operating was the difficulty for ordinary folk of making arrangements in far-flung places, with problems of language, currency and communication. The advent of the Internet has led to a rapid increase in self-packaging of holidays. However, tour operators still have their competence in arranging tours for those who do not have time to do DIY holidays, and specialize in large group events and meetings such as conferences or seminars. Also, tour operators still exercise contracting power with suppliers (airlines, hotels, other land arrangements, cruise companies and so on) and influence over other entities (tourism boards and other government authorities) in order to create packages and special group departures for destinations that might otherwise be difficult and expensive to visit.

== Trade associations ==
The three major tour operator associations in the U.S. are the National Tour Association (NTA), the United States Tour Operators Association (USTOA), and the American Bus Association (ABA). In Europe, there are the European Tour Operators Association (ETOA), and in the UK, the ABTA – The Travel Association and the Association of Independent Tour Operators (AITO). The primary association for receptive North American inbound tour operators is the International Inbound Travel Association.

== See also ==
- Tour guide
- Tourism
- Ecotourism
- Sustainable tourism
- Impacts of tourism
