= A25 road =

Road in southern England

Coordinates: 51.25102°N 0.0603°W

A25

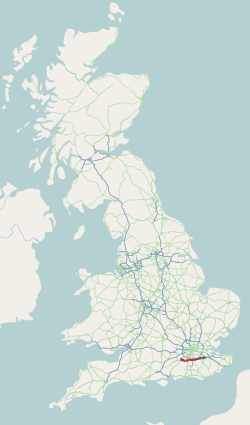

Route information
- Length: 46.5 mi (74.8 km)

Major junctions
- West end: A3 / A322 in Guildford
- A24 in Dorking A23 in Redhill; A22 near Godstone A21 near Riverhead
- East end: A20 in Wrotham Heath

Location
- Country: United Kingdom
- Counties: Surrey, Kent
- Primary destinations: Sevenoaks; Reigate; Dorking; Guildford

Road network
- Roads in the United Kingdom; Motorways; A and B road zones
← A24	→ A26

The A25 road is an east–west main road in the South-East of England. Its carries traffic east from Guildford, Surrey, eastward through Surrey and into mid-west Kent, to the town of Sevenoaks, and then on to Wrotham Heath where it connects with the A20.

The A25 exits east from Guildford, soon crossing southwards over the North Downs at Newlands Corner, to run eastward below the southern edge of the North Downs, with the road's route alternating between the Vale of Holmesdale and the Greensand Ridge, passing through Dorking, Reigate, Redhill, Nutfield, Bletchingley, Godstone, Oxted, Westerham, Brasted, Sevenoaks and Borough Green. It crosses over the River Wey at Guildford, the River Mole at Dorking, the River Eden at Oxted, and the River Darent at Westerham. The A25 has junctions with several major London to south coast roads: the A24 at Dorking; the A23 at Redhill; the A22 at Godstone; and the A21 at Sevenoaks.

A short distance east of Borough Green, at Wrotham Heath, the A25 ends at a junction with the A20, which continues eastward towards Maidstone, and then south-east to Ashford, Folkestone, and then Dover. At its west end in Guildford, the A25 connects with the A3 which takes traffic towards Portsmouth on the south coast. Before leaving Guildford, the A3 connects the A25 with the A31, which continues the westward route to Farnham, before tracking south-westward to Winchester and Bournemouth.

The M25 motorway parallels the A25 between Reigate and Sevenoaks, with connections at Reigate, Godstone, and Sevenoaks. The M26 motorway parallels the A25 between Sevenoaks and Wrotham Heath.

== Route ==
The east of the route the Victoria County History describes as a main road in 1911. Relatively briefly the modern road uses bypasses and straightened cuts. Many of the inns along its path were one time staging inns. One of the earliest sections of the M25 motorway runs parallel and to the north of the A25: hence the London Orbital Road was numbered M25.

As such, most of the route is a single carriageway and a very small minority of it is a dual carriageway: the junctions at Guildford and Redhill.

Its route is 1 mile (1.6 km) or less at all points south of the North Downs which has the Pilgrims' Way (here also known as the North Downs Way) and roughly follows an ancient trackway, which was longer and stretched to Salisbury, Wiltshire, the Harrow Way. The range is an intermittently broken by river valleys, variable width escarpment with a steep southern slope, often quarried away into vertical faces, it includes Botley Hill and Box Hill and this ridge is one of the two mentioned ranges of hills which form in the western half the Surrey Hills AONB.

The route has been included in the London-Surrey Cycle Classic alongside the entrances to Hatchlands Park and Clandon Park in Surrey. The east of the county has Reigate Castle along its route. Combe Bank Landscaped Grounds and Squerryes Court are along the route in west Kent, bringing the total of listed English gardens along the route to four.

== Junction list ==
County	Location	mi	km	Destinations	Notes
Surrey	Guildford	0.0	0.0	A3 south-west / A322 north to A31 / A3100 / A323 – Portsmouth, Petersfield, Bagshot, Farnham, Godalming, Aldershot	Western terminus; western terminus of A322 concurrency
Surrey	Guildford	0.4	0.64	Woodbridge Road (A322 south)	Eastern terminus of A322 concurrency
Surrey	Guildford	0.7	1.1	A320 (Woking Road / Stoke Road) to A3 / M25 – London, Esher, Leatherhead, Woking	To M25 and Leatherhead signed eastbound only
Surrey	Guildford	1.5	2.4	London Road (A3100) to A3 – London, Dorking, Leatherhead, Guildford	Information signed eastbound only
Surrey	Guildford	2.1	3.4	Epsom Road (A246 west) / Uplands Road – Guildford	Guildford signed eastbound only; western terminus of A246 concurrency
Surrey	West Clandon	4.1	6.6	A246 east / A247 north-west (The Street) – Leatherhead, Woking, East Clandon	A246, Leatherhead, and East Clandon signed westbound only; eastern terminus of A246 concurrency; south-eastern terminus of A247
Surrey	Albury	6.5	10.5	A248 west (Sherbourne) – Godalming, Albury	Eastern terminus of A248
Surrey	Dorking	13.4	21.6	A2003 north (Chalkpit Lane) to M25 / A24 – London, Leatherhead, Reigate	To A24 signed eastbound only; western terminus of A2003 concurrency
Surrey	Dorking	13.9	22.4	A2003 south (Horsham Road) to A24 – Horsham	Westbound access only; eastern terminus of A2003 concurrency
Surrey	Dorking	14.2	22.9	A24 (Deepdene Avenue) to M25 – London, Guildford, Leatherhead, Horsham	
Surrey	Reigate	19.7	31.7	A217 north (London Street / Bell Street) to M25 – London, Gatwick Airport, Brighton	
Surrey	Reigate	20.0	32.2	A242 north-east (Croydon Road) – Croydon	Information signed eastbound only; south-western terminus of A242
Surrey	Redhill	21.6	34.8	A23 north (London Road) – London, Croydon	Western terminus of A23 concurrency
Surrey	Redhill	21.8	35.1	A23 south (Marketfield Way) – Gatwick Airport, Brighton	Eastern terminus of A23 concurrency
Surrey	Godstone	27.6	44.4	A22 to M25 / M23 – London, Croydon, East Grinstead, Eastbourne, Caterham	
Kent	Westerham	34.1	54.9	A233 north (Beggars Lane) – Biggin Hill, Bromley	Southern terminus of A233
Kent	Chevening	36.9– 37.2	59.4– 59.9	A21 to M25 / M20 – Maidstone, Bromley, Hastings, Tonbridge	To M20 and Maidstone signed eastbound only, Tonbridge westbound only
Kent	Riverhead	38.0	61.2	A224 south (Amherst Hill) – Sevenoaks	Western terminus of A224 concurrency
Kent	Riverhead	38.1	61.3	A224 north (London Road) – Bromley, Dunton Green	Eastern terminus of A224 concurrency
Kent	Sevenoaks	39.2	63.1	A225 (Otford Road / St John's Hill) – Town centre, Otford	
Kent	Ightham	44.2	71.1	A227 south (Borough Green Road) – Tonbridge, Ightham	Western terminus of A227 concurrency
Kent	Borough Green	44.6	71.8	A227 north (Western Road) – Wrotham, Gravesend	Information signed eastbound only; eastern terminus of A227 concurrency
Kent	Wrotham Heath	46.5	74.8	A20 (London Road) / M26 / M25 / M20 – Maidstone, London, West Malling	Eastern terminus
1.000 mi = 1.609 km; 1.000 km = 0.621 mi: Incomplete access

== See also ==
- Great Britain road numbering scheme
- A roads in Zone 2 (Great Britain's roads)
