= Addington, Kent =

Village in Kent, England

Addington
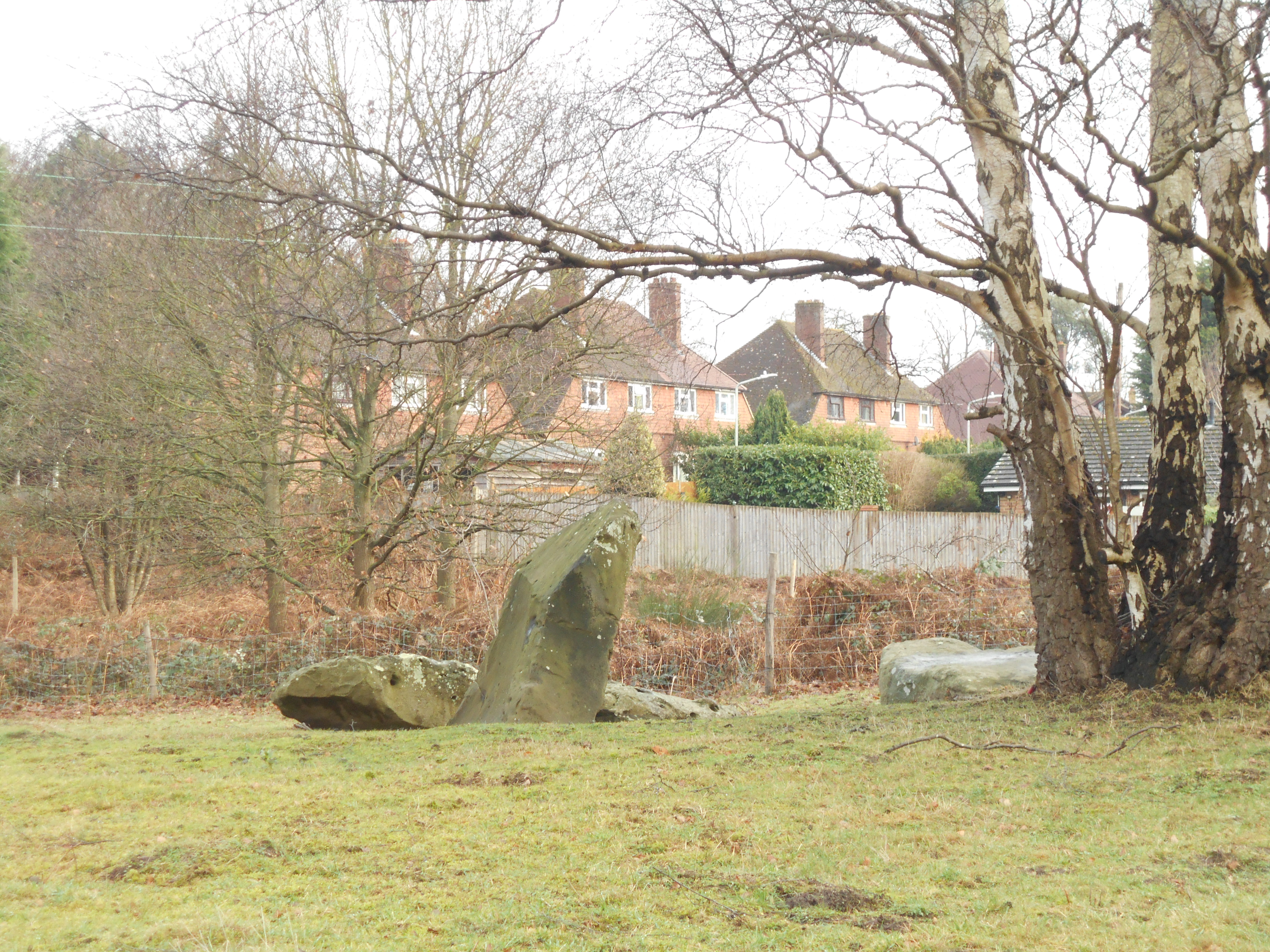

- Location within Kent
- Population: 769 (2011 Census)
- District: Tonbridge and Malling
- Shire county: Kent
- Region: South East
- Country: England
- Sovereign state: United Kingdom
- Post town: West Malling
- Postcode district: ME19
- Police: Kent
- Fire: Kent
- Ambulance: South East Coast
- UK Parliament: Tonbridge

Addington is a village in the English county of Kent. It is close to the M20 motorway, and between the villages of Wrotham Heath and West Malling. In the Domesday Book of 1086 it is called Eddintune. The meaning of the village's name is "Æddi's (or Eadda's) estate". The village is notable for the long barrows, Neolithic chamber tombs. Its parish covers a little under 700 acres (2.8 km^{2}), containing 291 houses. Addington Brook runs through the parish.

== History ==
Addington has been continuously inhabited for over 5,000 years. Many Neolithic artifacts have been extracted from the village, but much archaeological evidence has been lost to mechanical digging. Some sites were excavated during the building of the motorway. It had two mills at the time of the Domesday survey. There was a watermill powered by the Addington Brook (TQ 656 587 51°18′12″N 0°22′36″E), demolished in the nineteenth century; the site now lies within West Malling Golf Course. The remains of an old structure named the Addington Place were visible until the early 21st century, now beneath a golf course and stables.

During the Black Death, Addington was severely affected, and four of the church rectors succumbed to it.

== Features ==
The village has one pub, the Angel. There are rumours of a tunnel running from the pub's basement to the church, located 750 m (820 yd) away. Addington does not have a school, so children attend schools in nearby villages. Addington is divided by the M20 and M26 motorways. There are sandpits and quarries on both sides of the motorways, which are now almost entirely worked out.

The village is home to Addington Village Cricket Club, which has two Saturday teams and a 1st XI that plays in Division 2 of the Kent League (1st XI).

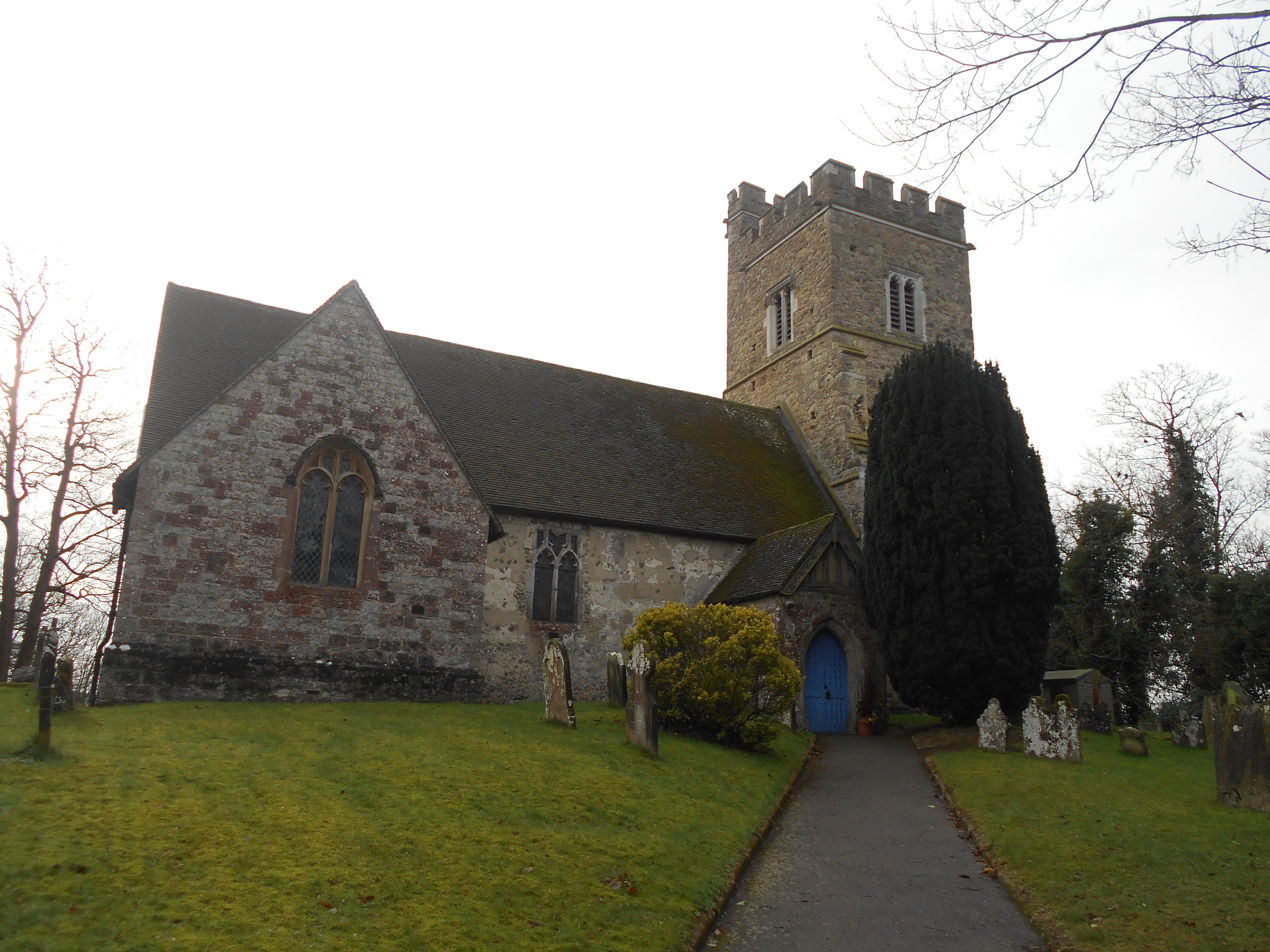
St Margaret's Church

The parish church is dedicated to St. Margaret, and dates back to 1403. It is part of a combined benefice with All Saints Birling, St. Martin Ryarsh and St. Peter & St. Paul Trottiscliffe.

Traces of the former gardens of Addington Park can still be seen. Rockeries, ponds and old tennis courts are easily discernible in the private grounds of the Seekers Trust between a church and the golf course.

== Long barrows ==
=== Chestnuts ===
The Chestnuts long barrow is the better preserved of the two long barrows. It was excavated in 1957, and artifacts from the dig are displayed in Maidstone Museum. It is believed to be on a Ley line.

=== Addington ===
Addington long barrow is not well-preserved. Its area has been plundered throughout the history of the village, and a road goes through it.

== See also ==
- Listed buildings in Addington, Kent
