= A21 road (England) =

Road in southern England

A21

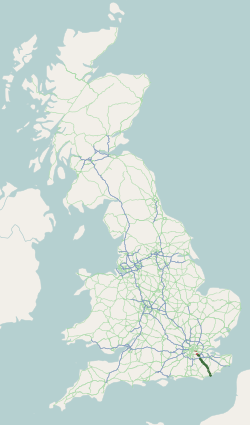

Route information
- Length: 58.6 mi (94.3 km)

Major junctions
- Southeast end: A259 in Hastings 50.8611°N 0.5582°E

- A229 near Hurst Green A228 / A264 near Pembury; A26 in Tonbridge; A25 near Sevenoaks M25 near Sevenoaks A205 in Catford
- Northwest end: A20 in Lewisham, London 51.4569°N 0.0135°W

Location
- Country: United Kingdom
- Constituent country: England
- Counties: East Sussex, Kent, Greater London
- Primary destinations: Bromley; Sevenoaks; Royal Tunbridge Wells

Road network
- Roads in the United Kingdom; Motorways; A and B road zones

The A21 is a trunk road in Southern England, one of several which connect London and various commuter towns to the south coast. It provides a link to Hastings, East Sussex and parts of Kent. Half of the distance covered is over gently undulating terrain, with some hills and bends. Traffic is often is slow-moving, particularly on weekdays on the short single carriageway stretches; and in summer with holiday traffic. Because of this, people have described the A21 as "a joke" and businesspeople have been reported to "hate coming down the A21". There have been many proposals to upgrade parts of the A21 in response to this.

Parts of the A21 follow the historic turnpike roads: for example the section from Sevenoaks to Tunbridge Wells, opened in 1710; other sections of the road were similarly dealt with later in the century. It is also the location of the first wildlife overbridge in the United Kingdom, near Lamberhurst. The road between the M25 and Hastings is designated a trunk road, and is maintained and managed by National Highways.

The A21 is used for the 55 miles (89 km) Maydayrun to Hastings in which motorcyclists ride from south London to the Hastings seafront. It claims to be the largest non-organised event in the UK, attracting over 20,000 bikers.

== History ==
=== Turnpikes ===
Parts of the A21 follow the turnpike roads: one being the section from Sevenoaks to Tunbridge Wells, opened in 1710; other sections of the road were similarly dealt with later in the century.

=== A2100 road ===
South of Johns Cross, the A21 originally followed the present day A2100 road passing Mountfield and heading through Battle and approaching Silverhill via Hollington. The A21 was later rerouted to the east along what was formerly the B2091, A229 and A28.

=== Upgraded dual-carriageway sections ===
Sections of the A21 were upgraded to a dual carriageway standard in stages in the 20th century.

==== Sevenoaks Bypass ====
The Sevenoaks Bypass opened in 1966.

==== Tonbridge Bypass ====
It was followed by the Tonbridge bypass and associated Medway Valley viaduct in July 1971.

==== Pembury Bypass ====
The Pembury bypass opened in 1988, followed by the Robertsbridge bypass in 1989.

==== Lamberhurst Bypass ====
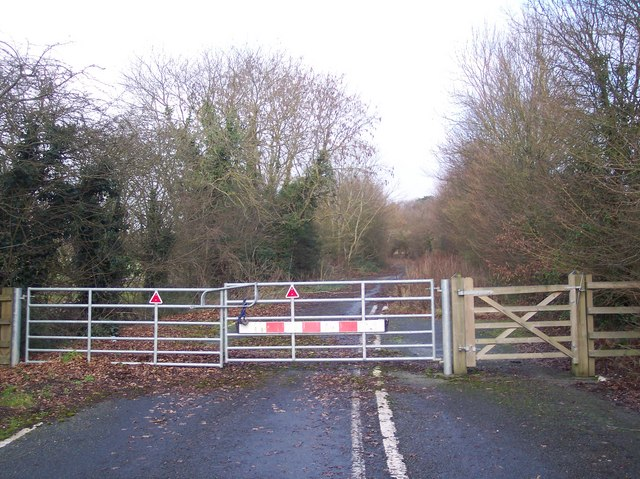
Abandoned section near Lamberhurst

The Lamberhurst Bypass was opened on 23 March 2005 to a cost of £18 million. The A21 used to have steep inclines into the village and the valley of the River Bewl. Included in the scheme is Britain's first land bridge at Scotney Castle which facilitates safe migration of wild animals over the road. The scheme was constructed by May Gurney who planted 50,000 trees on the new road.

=== Tonbridge and Pembury Bypass separation road width ===
Between 1988 and 2017, the Tonbridge bypass and the Pembury bypass were separated by a 1.7 miles (2.7 km) section of 7.3 m wide single carriageway with no footways or verges. Severe congestion was frequent as this stretch carried an average of 35,000 vehicles each day, significantly higher than its original capacity, and the number of accidents occurring on this road was above the national average. There were proposals to upgrade this section of A21 to a dual carriageway standard following the Pembury bypasses completion, however they were delayed multiple times. In the 2000s, an upgrade scheme was proposed by the Highways Agency, and in 2013, it underwent public enquiry. The scheme layout followed the existing carriageway and involved the construction of a pedestrian and cycle route along its whole length, as well as upgrading the Longfield Road roundabout into a grade-separated Roundabout interchange. £92 million of government money was made available to the scheme in July 2013. Preparatory works started in September 2014, which involved nine hectares of ancient woodland being removed. Trees and shrubs were relocated to adjacent land and nesting boxes were installed to protect endangered species such as the dormouse. As a result of the widening of the carriageway a number of buildings were demolished, including a Grade II listed 18th century barn. Completion of the scheme was delayed in late 2016 after the discovery of asbestos contamination. The improved road opened in September 2017.

== Modern route ==
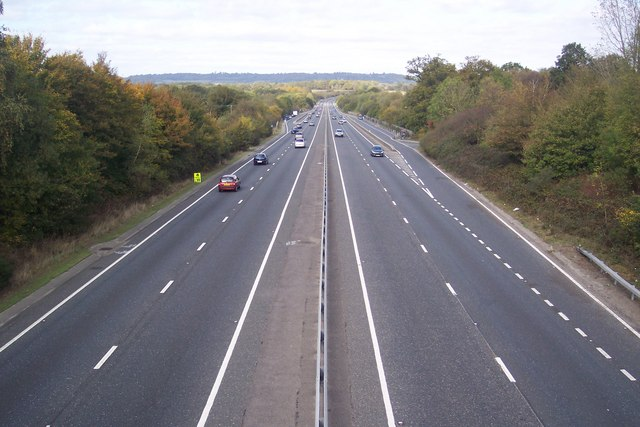
A21 near Leigh, Kent

=== Overview ===
The A21 begins in Lewisham, about 5.9 miles (9 km) southeast of the centre of London. Passing through Catford, Bromley and Farnborough, 20 miles (32 km) from the start of the journey, it reaches the Kent border and the open countryside. Shortly afterwards the M25 is reached, with which it multiplexes for about 5 miles (8.0 km). At this point, the road becomes a trunk road, a distinction it has held since April 1977. The continuation through Kent heads south east for around 26 miles (42 km). This section is mostly a dual carriageway; but there are a few short stretches of single carriageway, resulting in frequent congestion, especially in peak periods. Beyond the East Sussex border, the road is entirely single carriageway, sometimes with steep gradients. Another bypass takes the A21 around the narrow road through Salehurst and Robertsbridge. Immediately before Hastings is the final hill, almost 4 miles (6.4 km) in length.

=== London ===
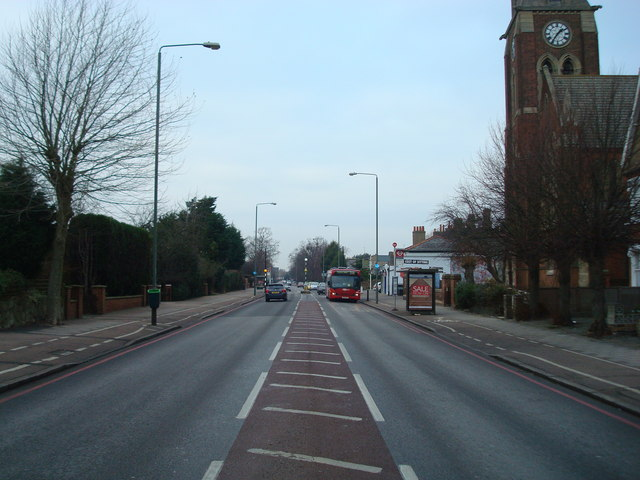
A21 in Bromley, London

The A21 starts in Lewisham in London at a junction with the A20 known as "Loampit Vale Junction". From there the road uses various roads in Catford, where the A205 (the South Circular Road) crosses the A21; it runs south east up Bromley Hill to enter the London Borough of Bromley, where there are sections of dual carriageway, on the town's gyratory system (part of which is called Kentish Way) .

Up Masons Hill the road reaches Bromley Common, the first large-scale open space negotiated; briefly, just before Farnborough, the road becomes Hastings Road. The original A21 went through the suburb, the High Street is now the B2158. Until now the road has been in a south-easterly direction, but after Green Street Green it turns eastwards towards the valley of the River Darent, and it is at this point that the road pattern makes a complete change from its original route.

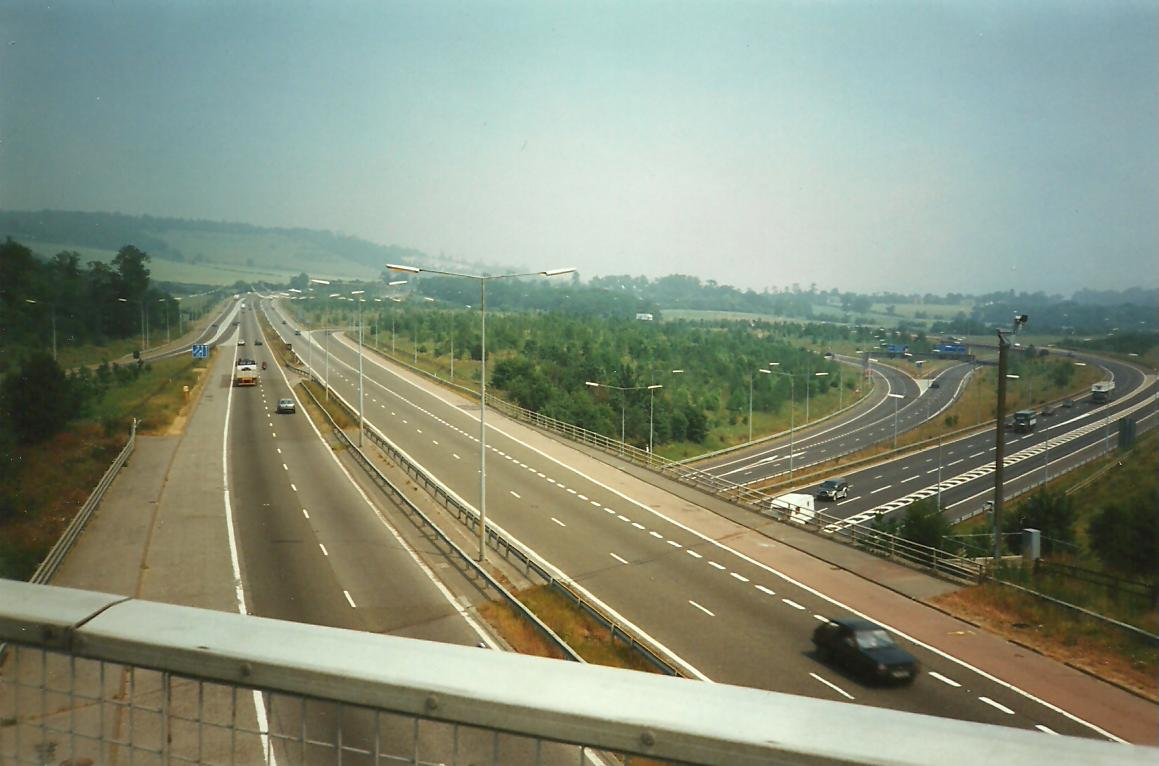
A21 through Chevening Interchange

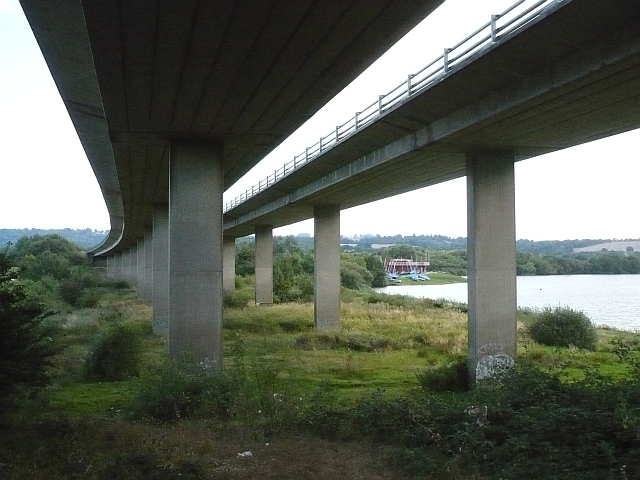
Viaducts crossing the Medway Valley near Haysden

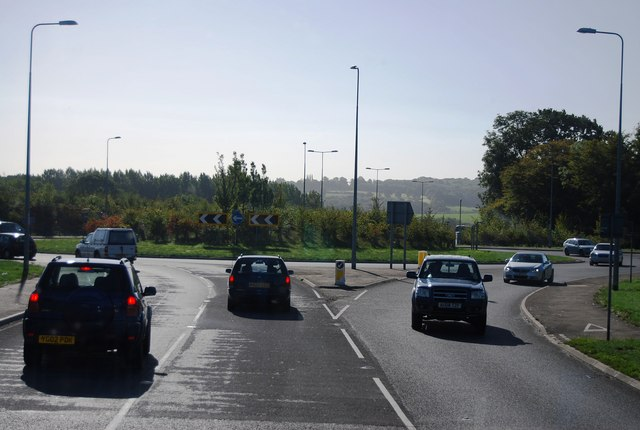
A21 at Forstal Farm Roundabout

The A21 originally entered Kent here and climbed to the scarp of the North Downs at Polhill, and then descended through Dunton Green and up the valley of the River Darent to Sevenoaks; through the town centre and then down into the Medway valley via Hildenborough to Tonbridge. The London Road at the north of the town is now the B245; it continued through the long High Street, over the many bridges of the river (during which time it was also part of the A26 from Maidstone ). As the road began to climb out of the valley it took a left fork; shortly after this the route of the modern A21 is rejoined.

=== Knockholt to Castle Hill ===
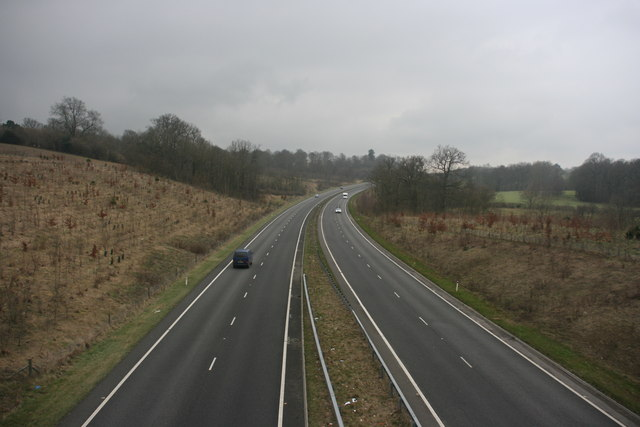
The Lamberhurst Bypass

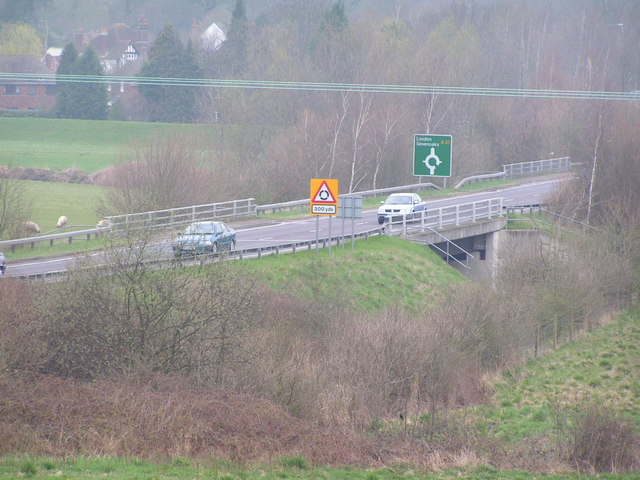
A21 near Robertsbridge

Where the new A21 begins, and also where the A224 joins from the north, the road is called the Sevenoaks Road; at Knockholt (Hewitts Roundabout), the road enters Kent near its junction with a spur from the M25 motorway. The A21 actually multiplexes with the M25 and descends the North Downs Scarp here. The M25 then has to use a slip road in the left lane and the A21 takes priority although is still technically a motorway until the junction with the A25 to Sevenoaks and the M26. The oddness of Junction 5 is due to the M26 once being part of the M25. Before the M25 was built, the A21 was the modern A224 near Polhill and then became the dual carriageway Sevenoaks bypass.

This section of the road is a grade separated dual carriageway with two lanes in each direction (aside from a three lane section northbound climbing Hubbards Hill). The road passes to the west of the town, running through a nearby valley until it meets the A225 and B245 at Morley's Interchange near Sevenoaks Weald. The next section bypasses the original route of the A21 along the B245 through Hildenborough, Tonbridge High Street, and Pembury Road to join the current route near the second A26 junction.

Between Leigh and Haysden the road crosses the River Medway by means of a two-span viaduct. Around this point, the road enters the High Weald Area of Outstanding Natural Beauty. The A21 then meets the two junctions with the A26, providing access to Tonbridge and Southborough.

=== Castle Hill to Lamberhurst ===
After the end of the Tonbridge bypass, the A21 climbs Castle Hill as the Pembury Bypass as it reaches the North Farm interchange with the flyover for non-stop traffic. The next junction is with the A264 road to Tunbridge Wells and the A228 to Maidstone. The road later meets the original alignment at an at-grade junction (leaving a brief gap in the central reservation) not long before it meets a double roundabout at Kippings Cross where another section of single carriageway starts. The next section of A21 is a major bottleneck, being a single carriageway with frequent bends. In October 2005 the "Preferred Route" to upgrade this 3 miles (4.8 km) section was announced. However, the scheme has since been suspended.

=== Lamberhurst to John's Cross ===
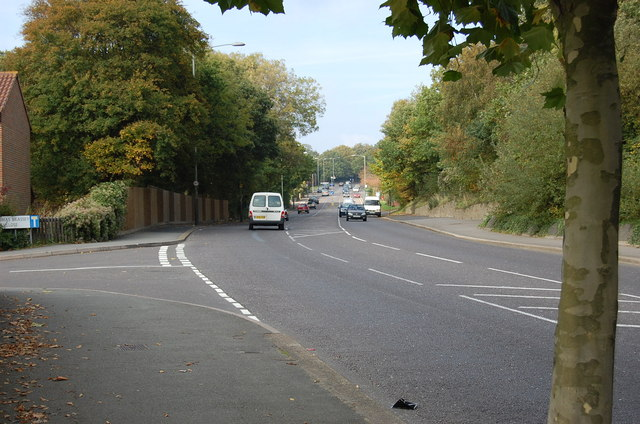
Sedlescombe Road North, Hastings

After a junction with the A262, the road returns to a dual carriageway standard along the 2-mile (3.2 km) Lamberhurst bypass where the A21 skirts to the east of the village on a road through various farms until eventually it gets to Scotney Castle where the dual carriageway ends at a roundabout.

The next section of road is a single carriageway which travels past Bewl Water and Kilndown until it once again becomes a dual carriageway for 1.2 miles (1.9 km). However it has been reduced to one lane in each direction to reduce speeding. As the dual Carriageway ends, the road enters East Sussex and meets the A268, taking traffic to/from Rye. The A21 then travels through numerous conjoined villages including Hurst Green where it meets the A265 from Heathfield. After a hill descent, the road reaches a roundabout where the Robertsbridge bypass begins, taking traffic away from the main street in the village. This is built to a single carriageway standard. The road then regains the original route before meeting the A2100 at a roundabout in the hamlet of Johns Cross.

=== Mountfield to Hastings ===
After Johns Cross roundabout, the A21 takes a relatively straight, though undulating, journey, through Whatlington and passes Sedlescombe before climbing a four-mile (6.4 km) long hill to enter Hastings where the first junction reached is the Baldslow Interchange where currently the A28, A2100 and B2093 roads all terminate. The A21 then heads through northern Hastings where the road is known as Sedlescombe road North with access to sub-urban streets until eventually it meets the A2101 which heads for the Town Centre. The A21 then enters Silverhill where it gets to a junction which is sometimes a major bottleneck. Afterwards the A2102 heads for St Leonards and the A21 becomes the high street of Bohemia where the road is narrow. The route then heads down with access to various emergency services and then enters the town centre. From here the original A21 cut through the town centre to meet the A259 at a roundabout near Pelham Crescent however since the town centre has been pedestrianised the A21 heads down on the sub-urban streets to the east. The next section of the A21 heads around partly on a one-way system near the railway station and the Priory Quarter business development. From here, the southbound stretch of A21 is reserved for buses only and terminates on the A259.

== Junctions ==
County	Location	mi	km	Destinations	Notes
East Sussex	Hastings	0.0	0.0	A259 (Denmark Place / Carlisle Place) – Folkestone, Brighton	Southeastern terminus
East Sussex	Hastings	1.5	2.4	A2102 south (St Matthew's Drive) – St Leonards	Northern terminus of A2102
East Sussex	Hastings	2.3	3.7	A2101 south-east (St Helen's Road) – Hastings	A2101 signed southbound only; north-western terminus of A2101
East Sussex	Hastings	3.5	5.6	A2100 to A259 – Battle, Folkestone	Information signed northbound only
East Sussex	Hastings	3.7	6.0	A28 north-east (Westfield Lane) – Ashford, Westfield, Tenterden	Tenterden signed southbound only; south-western terminus of A28
East Sussex	Mountfield	9.6	15.4	A2100 south-east (London Road) – Battle, Bexhill	Information signed northbound only; north-western terminus of A2100
East Sussex	Hurst Green	13.8	22.2	A265 west (Station Road) – Lewes	Eastern terminus of A265
East Sussex	Hurst Green	14.2	22.9	A229 north (Merriments Lane) – Hawkhurst, Maidstone	Southern terminus of A229
East Sussex	Flimwell	16.7	26.9	A268 east (Hawkhurst Road) / B2087 (High Street) – Hawkhurst, Ticehurst	Western terminus of A268
Kent	Lamberhurst	21.8	35.1	A262 east / B2162 – Goudhurst, Horsmonden, Lamberhurst	Western terminus of A262
Kent	Royal Tunbridge Wells–Pembury boundary			Begin freeway	
Kent	Royal Tunbridge Wells–Pembury boundary	26.9	43.3	A228 north / A264 west to B2161 – Tunbridge Wells, Pembury, Maidstone, Paddock Wood	Maidstone signed northbound only, To B2161 and Paddock Wood southbound only; southern terminus of A228; eastern terminus of A264
Kent	Royal Tunbridge Wells–Pembury boundary	27.6– 28.1	44.4– 45.2	Pembury	
Kent	Pembury–Capel boundary	28.3– 28.7	45.5– 46.2	Capel	
Kent	Capel–Tonbridge boundary	29.7– 30.2	47.8– 48.6	A26 north-east – Tonbridge	
Kent	Tonbridge	31.1	50.1	A26 – Southborough, Tubridge Wells	South-east exit and north-west entrance
Kent	Sevenoaks Weald	35.6– 36.2	57.3– 58.3	A225 north / B245 – Sevenoaks, Hildenborough, Sevenoaks Weald	B245 signed south-east only; southern terminus of A225
Kent	Chevening	39.9– 40.3	64.2– 64.9	A25 – Westerham, Sevenoaks, Riverhead	
Kent	Chevening	40.5– 41.7	65.2– 67.1	M25 west to M23 / M3 / M4 – Gatwick Airport, Heathrow Airport	To M3 signed north-west only; south-eastern terminus of M25 concurrency; M25 junction 5
Kent	Shoreham	44.5– 45.0	71.6– 72.4	M25 east to M20 / M11 / M1 – Stansted Airport, Central London, Maidstone	Stansted Airport and Central London signed north-west only, Maidstone southeast only; north-western terminus of M25 concurrency; M25 junction 4
Kent	Shoreham	45.0	72.4	End freeway	
Kent–Greater London boundary	Shoreham–Bromley boundary	45.8	73.7	A224 (Orpington By-Pass) / Hewitts Road / Wheatsheaf Hill – Dunton Green, Orpington, St Mary Cray, Badgers Mount, Chelsfield, Halstead, Well Hill	
Greater London	Bromley	48.1	77.4	A223 north (High Street) / Cudham Lane North – Orpington, Green Street Green, Cudham	Southern terminus of A223
Greater London	Bromley	50.4	81.1	A232 (Crofton Road / Croydon Road) – Orpington, Croydon, Locksbottom, Biggin Hill, West Wickham, Hayes	Biggin Hill, West Wickham, and Hayes signed north-west only
Greater London	Bromley	51.4	82.7	Oakley Road (A233 south)	Northern terminus of A233
Greater London	Bromley	53.6	86.3	A222 (Widmore Road) to A234 – Chislehurst, Sidcup, Elmstead, Beckenham, Croydon	Beckenham and Croydon signed south-east only
Greater London	Bromley	53.9	86.7	A2212 north (College Road) – Grove Park	Information signed south-east only; southern terminus of A2212
Greater London	Lewisham	55.7	89.6	Beckenham Hill Road (A2015 south-west)	North-eastern terminus of A2015
Greater London	Lewisham	55.9	90.0	Southend Lane (A2218 west) / Whitefoot Lane	Eastern terminus of A2218
Greater London	Lewisham	57.1	91.9	A205 (South Circular Road) – Clapham Junction, Woolwich	Brief concurrency
Greater London	Lewisham	58.6	94.3	A20 to A2211 – Central London, Peckham, New Cross, Woolwich, Lee Green, Greenwich	North-western terminus
1.000 mi = 1.609 km; 1.000 km = 0.621 mi: Concurrency terminus

== Improvement proposals ==
Large portions of the A21, through Kent mostly, are dual carriageway with intervening stretches of single carriageway. There have long been plans are to upgrade some of the remaining stretches of single carriageway to alleviate congestion, safety and accessibility problems in the villages along the route.

Safety is a particular concern because a 2002 report stated that a 14 mi (23 km) section of the A21 south of Flimwell was the most dangerous road in the south east outside London, and the 38th most dangerous in the country, however it has since been overtaken by the A259 between Pevensey and Bexhill-on-Sea.

=== Kippings Cross to Lamberhurst ===
When the Pembury bypass ends at Kippings Cross, the next section of A21 is a low quality single carriageway road with several steep gradients across the Weald. There are few major centres of habitation on the road and limited or no footpaths. There are many houses next to the route and the road has very frequent bends. The Kippings Cross to Lamberhurst section has a high accident rate and congestion occurs particularly at peak times.

It is proposed that this section should be turned into a two-lane dual carriageway with footpaths and is proposed to be completely off-line, although mainly following the existing route, and have improvements to the A262 roundabout. The Bypass is said to cost £40 million.

This scheme has since been suspended following the 2010 spending review.

=== Flimwell to Robertsbridge ===
Plans have been published for a new road between the southern end of the Flimwell bypass and the beginning of the Robertsbridge bypass. The 5.5-mile (8.9 km) improvement will bypass the villages of Flimwell, Hurst Green and Silver Hill. The improvement will commence at the B2079 junction (Lady Oak Lane) on the short section of existing dual carriageway north of Flimwell and terminate at the roundabout at the northern end of the Robertsbridge Bypass. Although part of the road will be brought up to a dual carriageway standard, parts will become a "wide single carriageway". This scheme has been postponed until 2015 at the earliest and currently route protection is being lifted.

=== Baldslow Interchange ===
Since the Hastings-Bexhill Link Road opened, more traffic has started to use the already congested road from the A2100/A28 to the A21 at Baldslow Interchange, Hastings. Construction is underway to build a short link road to the A21 south of the interchange and bring more of the A21, from there up past to a new roundabout in an area north of the interchange, to dual carriageway standard. Another option was to realign the A2100 north of the junction, but this option was less favourable due to environmental concerns.

=== Further upgrades ===
Schemes to upgrade the following sections have also been proposed:

Lamberhurst to Flimwell
Robertsbridge to Baldslow

== See also ==
- Great Britain road numbering scheme
