= A26 road =

Road in England

A26

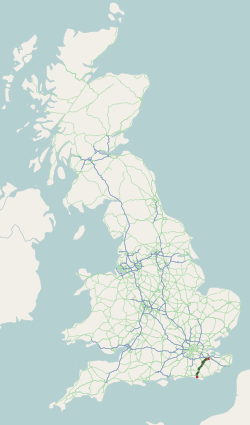

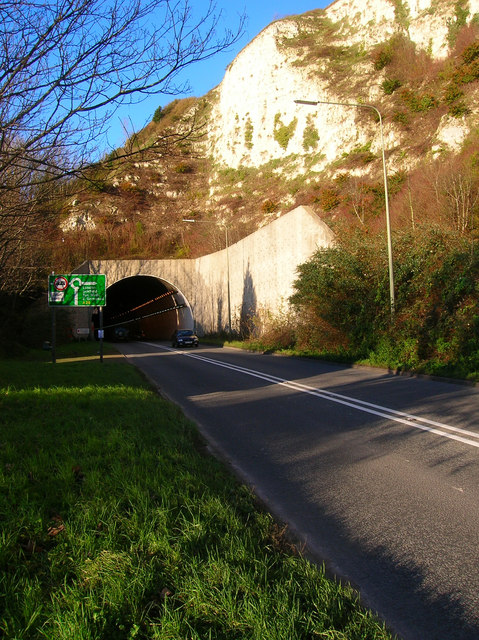
- A26 Cuilfail Tunnel in Lewes

Major junctions
- Northeast end: Maidstone
- A20; A228; A21; A272; A22; A27; A259
- Southwest end: Newhaven

Location
- Country: United Kingdom
- Primary destinations: Tunbridge Wells, Tonbridge, Maidstone, Lewes

Road network
- Roads in the United Kingdom; Motorways; A and B road zones
← A25	→ A27

The A26 road is a primary route in the southeast of England, going from Maidstone to Newhaven through the counties of Kent and East Sussex. The road is mostly single carriageway, with one lane in each direction, although parts of the road are three lanes, with the middle lane switching sides for overtaking and right turns.

The road runs for a total distance of some 50 miles (80 kilometres) and provides access to the North Kent area and its industrial base with the ferry port of Newhaven. Consequently, it has a large Heavy Goods Vehicle usage.

== History ==
The A26 was originally classified in 1922 due to the Ministry of Transport Act 1919, which in section 19 instructed the classification of all major roads. The original route went from Maidstone to Brighton, along part of what is now the A27. The part of the road going from Lewes was later reclassified to the A27 between 1947 and 1951. The road was later extended along the B2109 to Newhaven after 1969.

== Route Maidstone ==
=== Maidstone to Tonbridge ===
The road starts as a non-primary route at a gyratory with the A20, in Maidstone, and then heads west to the A228, through Barming, Barming Heath, Teston, Wateringbury, and Mereworth, where it becomes a primary route.

It then turns southwest towards Tonbridge and shares the route of the A228 until the next roundabout with Seven Mile Lane. The A26 passes through Hadlow and the edge of Tonbridge. Since 1970 it has formed an eastern bypass of Tonbridge town centre, which terminates at the Vauxhall roundabout, where there are slip roads to the A21 dual carriageway. From this roundabout, the A2014 Pembury Road runs into Tonbridge. The A26 route continues at the western end of Pembury Road, heading south as Quarry Hill and forming a grade-separated junction with the A21.

=== Tonbridge to Maresfield ===
South of Tonbridge the A26 passes through Bidborough, Southborough, Royal Tunbridge Wells, Eridge Green, and Boarshead. The road then passes through Crowborough, going past the B2100, and then goes towards Maresfield, where it is interrupted by the A22.

=== Ridgewood to Newhaven ===
Again heading south-west, the road meets with the A2029 in Lewes after passing Little Horsted and leaves Lewes heading south via Cuilfail Tunnel until it is interrupted again, this time by the A27.

After a short stretch of road where it is merged with the A27, it heads south, ending on the A259 in Newhaven, after passing Tarring Neville and South Heighton.

== Distinguishing features ==
Approaching Lewes from Uckfield, visitors are greeted by a view of the chalk cliffs at the edge of the South Downs. Continuing, you enter the Cuilfail Tunnel, constructed in 1983, which leaves at the roundabout, The Culfail Spiral, a sculpture created by Peter Randall-Page.

== Junctions ==
County	Location	mi	km	Coord	Destinations	Notes
Kent	Maidstone	0	0	(Note: 51.2705°N 0.5128°E)	A20 - Maidstone, Ditton	
Kent	—	3.4	5.4	(Note: 51.2545°N 0.4445°E)	B2163 - West Farleigh, Coxheath	
Kent	—	4.3	6.9	(Note: 51.2554°N 0.4231°E)	B2015 - East Peckham	
Kent	—	6.6	10.6	(Note: 51.2543°N 0.3779°E)	A228 - Kings Hill, East Peckham; B2016 - Wrotham Heath	
Kent	Tonbridge	14.4	23.2	(Note: 51.1855°N 0.2938°E)	B2017 - Tudeley	
Kent	Tonbridge	15	24	(Note: 51.1818°N 0.2828°E)	A21 - Hastings, Sevenoaks A2014 - Tonbridge	Continues as A2014
Kent	Tonbridge	concurrency with the A2014				
Kent	Tonbridge	15.7	25.3	(Note: 51.1898°N 0.2697°E)	A2014 - Junction with A21; B2260 - Tonbridge	Continues from A2014
Kent	Tonbridge	16.4	26.4	(Note: 51.1818°N 0.2630°E)	A21 - Sevenoaks, London	No eastbound entry to A21 or westbound exit from A21
Kent	Royal Tunbridge Wells	17.3	27.8	(Note: 51.1712°N 0.2534°E)	B2176 - Penshurst	
Kent	Royal Tunbridge Wells	20.1	32.3	(Note: 51.1324°N 0.2588°E)	A264 - Langton Green, Pembury	
Kent	Royal Tunbridge Wells	20.5	33.0	(Note: 51.1274°N 0.2598°E)	B2023 - Royal Tunbridge Wells	
Kent	Royal Tunbridge Wells	25.6	33.1	(Note: 51.1268°N 0.2590°E)	A267 - Frant	
East Sussex	Crowborough	27.2	43.7	(Note: 51.0605°N 0.1616°E)	B2100 - Rotherfield	
East Sussex	—	33.4	53.8	(Note: 50.9922°N 0.0945°E)	A272 - Buxted	
East Sussex	—	33.8	54.4	(Note: 50.9880°N 0.0906°E)	A22 - East Grinstead	Continues as A22
East Sussex	Uckfield	concurrency with the A22				
East Sussex	Uckfield	36.6	58.9	(Note: 50.9516°N 0.0955°E)	A22 - Hailsham	Continues from A22
East Sussex	Lewes	42.5	68.4	(Note: 50.8843°N 0.0214°E)	B2192 - Rotherfield	
East Sussex	Lewes	43.2	69.5	(Note: 50.8759°N 0.0196°E)	A2029 - Lewes	
East Sussex	Lewes	44.0	70.9	(Note: 50.8646°N 0.0248°E)	A27 - Brighton, Worthing	Continues as A27
East Sussex	—	concurrency with the A27				
East Sussex	—	45.5	73.2	(Note: 50.8538°N 0.0527°E)	A27 - Eastbourne	Continues from A27
East Sussex	Newhaven	49.9	80.3	(Note: 50.8048°N 0.0531°E)	B2109 - Newhaven	
East Sussex	Newhaven	50.6	81.4	(Note: 50.7959°N 0.0557°E)	A259 - Peacehaven, Seaford	
1.000 mi = 1.609 km; 1.000 km = 0.621 mi: Concurrency terminus; Incomplete access

*Ceremonial Counties

Coordinate list
