= A2020 road =

Road in Kent, England

Coordinates: 51.2714°N 0.5420°E

A2020

Route information
- Existed: 1961–1977

Major junctions
- Aylesford end: West
- A26 A229 A249
- Bearsted end: East

Location
- Country: United Kingdom
- Constituent country: England

Road network
- Roads in the United Kingdom; Motorways; A and B road zones

The A2020 is a previous road in Kent but has been renumbered to A20 following the construction of the M20 motorway.

== History ==
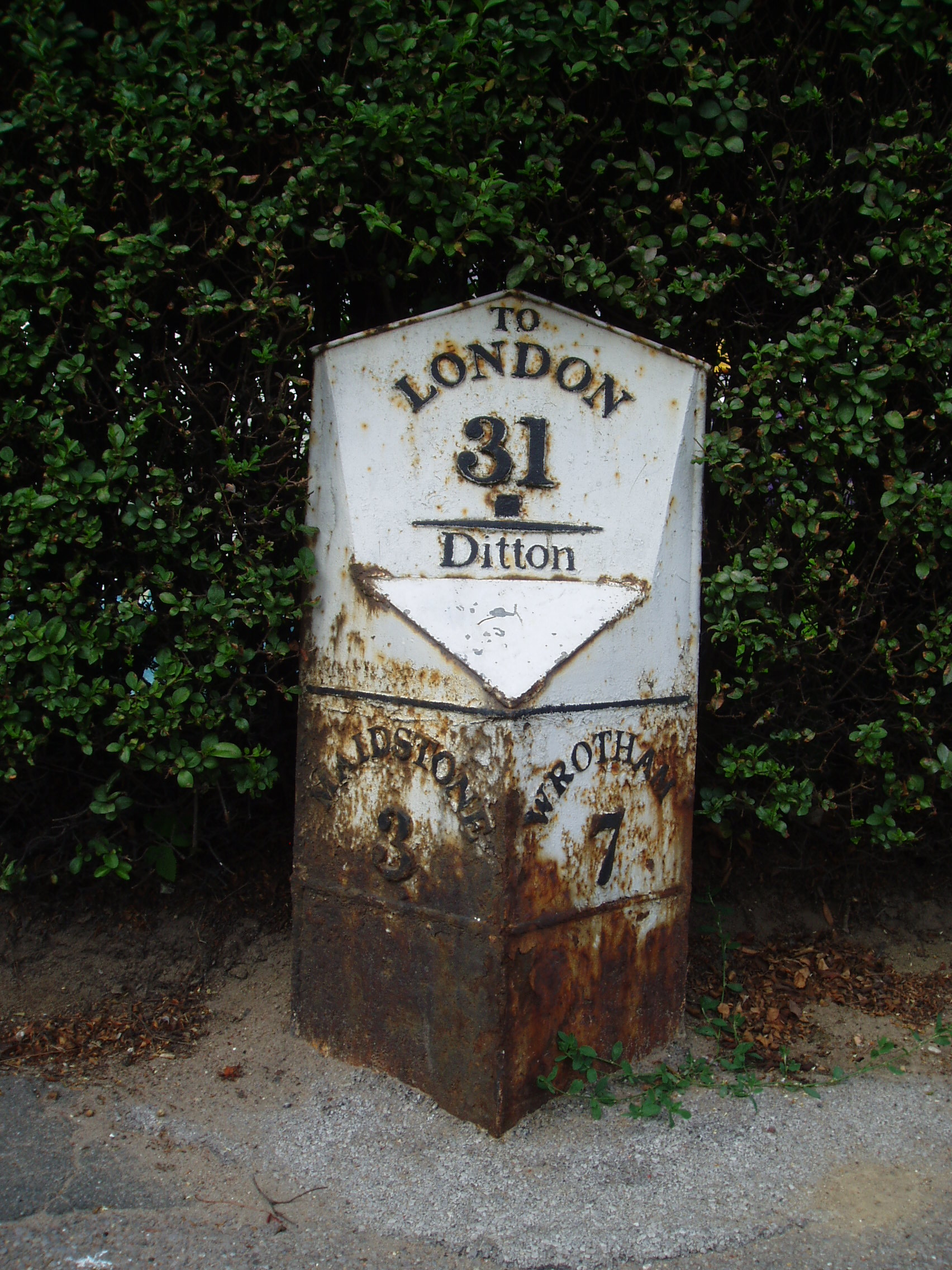
The A2020 may change its name, but the milestone stays the same

Between 1960 and 1961, two sections of (what is now known as) the M20 motorway were built between junctions 5 and 8. This was known as the Maidstone Bypass and was renumbered the A20(M) as it bypassed the stretch of the A20 through Maidstone. The A20 road was then renumbered as the A2020, which is the source of the name of the 20/20 Business Park, situated close to junction 5 of the present M20.

However, during 1971 and later in 1977, the A20(M) was extended westwards towards London and was renamed the M20 motorway, and as a result the A2020 reverted to being the A20. The 20/20 Business Park has kept its name, however.
