= Newingreen =

Village in Kent, England

Coordinates: 51.0846°N 1.0346°E

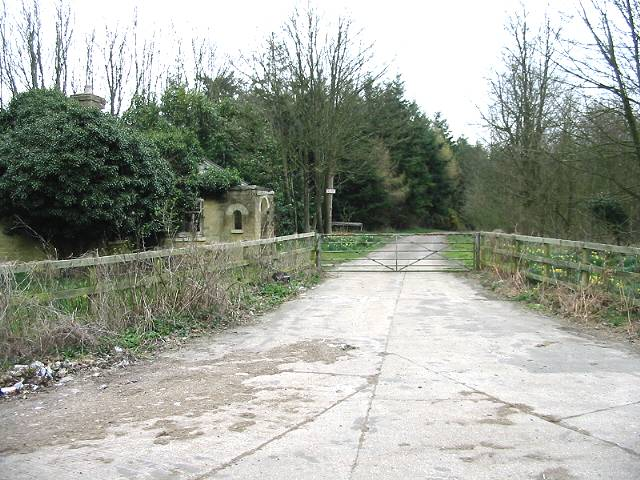
- Folks Wood, Newingreen

- Location within Kent
- Civil parish: Stanford
- District: Folkestone and Hythe
- Shire county: Kent
- Region: South East
- Country: England
- Sovereign state: United Kingdom
- Post town: HYTHE
- Postcode district: CT21
- Dialling code: 01303
- Police: Kent
- Fire: Kent
- Ambulance: South East Coast
- UK Parliament: Folkestone and Hythe

Newingreen is a village in the civil parish of Stanford, in the Folkestone and Hythe district, in Kent, England, near Folkestone. It is situated on the junction of the A20 and the historic Stone Street between Lympne and Canterbury. The village is near Junction 11 of the M20.

== Transport ==
=== Rail ===
The railway station at Westenhanger is just over half a mile away from the village centre, offering direct links to London Charing Cross via Tonbridge. Until 2020, passengers were able to change at Ashford International for services to Paris Gare du Nord (with a typical total journey time of a little over an hour off peak during the week), but, as Eurostar trains no longer stop at Ashford, it is now necessary to travel up to London St Pancras International.

=== Bus ===
The route 10 bus operated by Stagecoach East Kent passes through the village between Folkestone and Ashford, typically with an hourly service.

=== Coach ===
The National Express service SH021 offers a direct link to London Victoria coach station and Dover from designated stops either side of the A20 in the village centre. The route passes through Ashford and Maidstone on the way towards London, and through Folkestone coastbound.
