= Listed buildings in Addington, Kent =

Civil Parish in Kent, England

Addington is a village and civil parish in Kent, England. It contains 17 listed buildings that are recorded in the National Heritage List for England. Of these one grade I, one is grade II* and 15 are grade II.

This list is based on the information retrieved online from Historic England.

== Key ==
Grade	Criteria
I	Buildings that are of exceptional interest
II*	Particularly important buildings of more than special interest
II	Buildings that are of special interest

== Listing ==
Name	Grade	Location	Type	Completed (Note: The date given is the date used by Historic England as significant for the initial building or that of an important part in the structure's description.)	Date designated	Grid ref. (Note: The grid reference is based on the British national grid reference system, sometimes known as OSGB36, used by the Ordnance Survey.) Geo-coordinates	Notes	Entry number (Note: The "List Entry Number" is a unique number assigned to each listed building and scheduled monument by Historic England.)	Image	Wikidata
East Street Farmhouse	II	East Street			25 February 1987	TQ6600659181; 51°18′27″N 0°22′49″E		1070565	Upload Photo	
Bumblebee Barn	II	East Street			14 August 1984	TQ6601659207; 51°18′28″N 0°22′49″E		1070564	Upload Photo	
Old Cardicote White Cottage	II	East Street			25 February 1987	TQ6599059111; 51°18′25″N 0°22′48″E		1070563	Upload Photo	
Wall 40 Yards to the North East of Ford Place, That Part in Wrotham	II	Ford Lane			1 August 1952	TQ6366558625; 51°18′12″N 0°20′47″E		1236359	Upload Photo	
Wall 10 Yards to the North East of Ford Place	II	Ford Lane			1 August 1952	TQ6367458600; 51°18′11″N 0°20′48″E		1236357	Upload Photo	
Ford Place and Wall to North	II*	Ford Lane			1 August 1952	TQ6365058575; 51°18′10″N 0°20′46″E		1236317	Upload Photo	
Church of St Margaret	I	Park Road			25 August 1959	TQ6538558879; 51°18′18″N 0°22′16″E	Early Norman, W tower perpendicular, octagonal font, reredos 1881, brasses of Richard Charlis +1378, William Snayth +1409, armoured figure c. 1415, armoured figure c. 1445, Thomas Charworth +1446, monument to William Watton +1651, Lucy Locker +1780	1070567	Church of St Margaret More images	Q17530219
Chest Tomb 20 Yards to East of Addington Church	II	Park Road			25 February 1987	TQ6541158880; 51°18′18″N 0°22′18″E		1123708	Upload Photo	
Obelisk 20 Yards to East of Addington Church	II	Park Road			25 February 1987	TQ6541158877; 51°18′18″N 0°22′18″E		1363080	Obelisk 20 Yards to East of Addington Church More images	
Hedgehogs	II	St Vincent's Lane			25 February 1987	TQ6414458658; 51°18′12″N 0°21′12″E		1070568	Upload Photo	
Westfield Farmhouse	II	St Vincent's Lane			23 September 1985	TQ6447358942; 51°18′21″N 0°21′29″E		1337464	Upload Photo	
St Vincent's	II	St Vincent's Lane			1 August 1952	TQ6426958576; 51°18′09″N 0°21′18″E		1337427	Upload Photo	
Stables to the north east of the Angel Inn	II	The Green			7 August 1978	TQ6560959069; 51°18′24″N 0°22′28″E		1070566	Upload Photo	
Woodgate Cottages	II	Woodgate Road			25 February 1987	TQ6574359622; 51°18′42″N 0°22′36″E		1110844	Upload Photo	
Woodgate Farmhouse	II	Woodgate Road			25 February 1987	TQ6555859628; 51°18′42″N 0°22′27″E		1363081	Upload Photo	
The Angel Inn	II	The Green			7 August 1978	TQ6560159057; 51°18′24″N 0°22′28″E		1363078	Upload Photo	
1 and 2 The Laurels	II	1 and 2 The Laurels			5 August 1977	TQ6561259114; 51°18′25″N 0°22′28″E		1123702	Upload Photo	

== See also ==
- Grade I listed buildings in Kent
- Grade II* listed buildings in Kent

== Sources ==
- Newman, John (2012) [1969], Kent: West and the Weald, The Buildings of England, New Haven and London: Yale University Press, ISBN 978-0-300-18509-6
