= A20 road (England) =

Road in England

A20

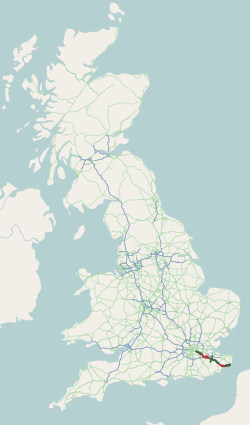

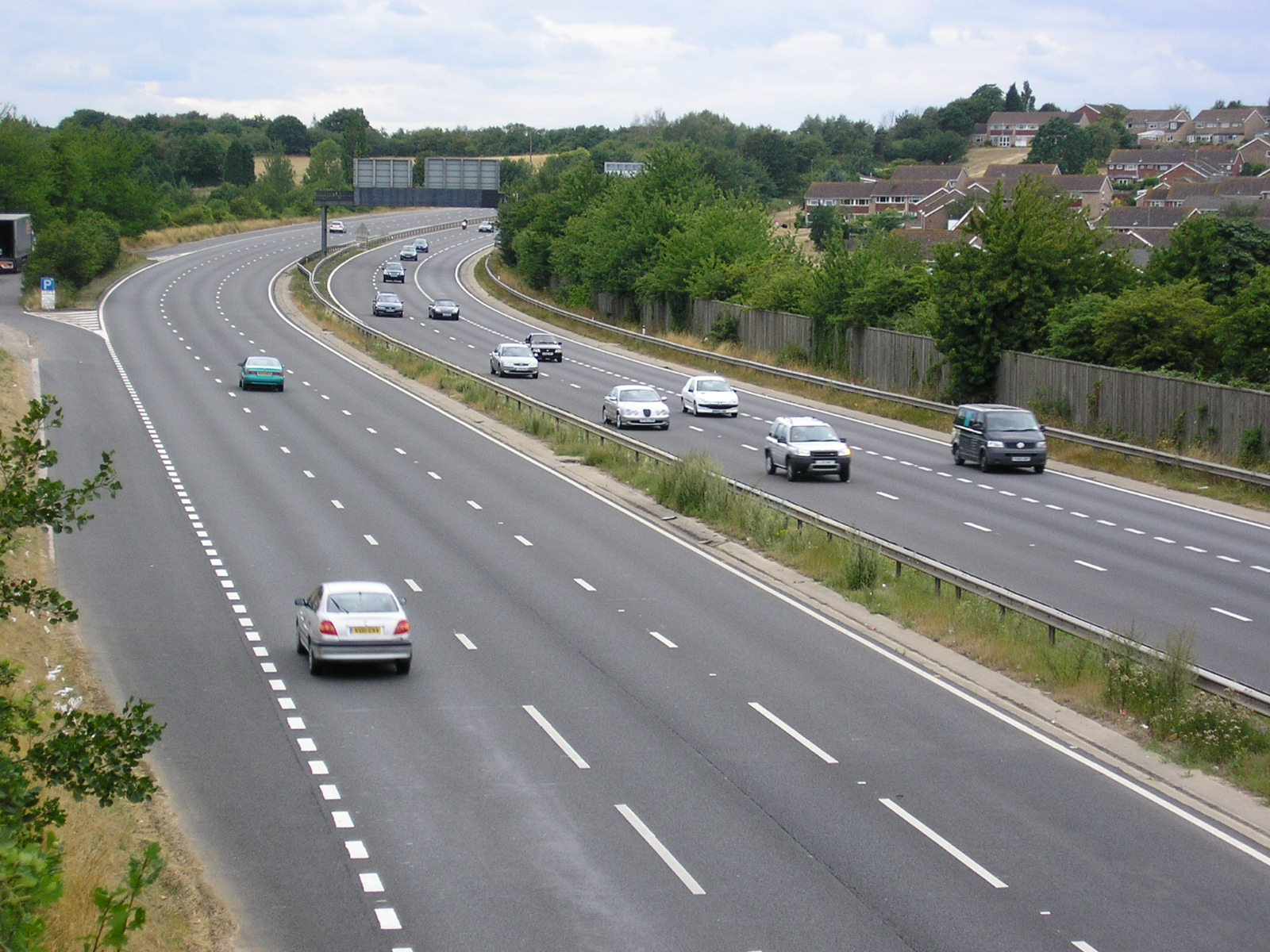
- The A20 near Swanley heading Westbound (London bound).

Route information
- Length: 74.4 mi (119.7 km)

Major junctions
- West end: A2 in New Cross, London 51.473°N 0.033°W)
- A205 in London M25 / M20 in Swanley M20 west in Wrotham M26 in Wrotham Heath; A25 in Wrotham Heath M20 near Maidstone; A28 in Ashford M20 in Ashford M20 in Folkestone
- East end: A2 in Dover (51.126°N 1.327°E)

Location
- Country: United Kingdom
- Constituent country: England
- Counties: Greater London, Kent
- Primary destinations: Swanley; Maidstone; Ashford; Folkestone

Road network
- Roads in the United Kingdom; Motorways; A and B road zones

The A20 is a major road in south-east England, carrying traffic from London to Dover in Kent. Parts of the route date back to turnpikes established in the early part of the 18th century. The line of the road throughout Kent runs closely in parallel with the M20 motorway.

== Route ==
=== From London to the M25 ===
Traffic leaving London at first takes the A2 road. At New Cross in the London Borough of Lewisham the A20 begins and heads in a south-easterly direction, becoming Lewisham Way and Loampit Vale. The latter road forms a large junction, where the A21 separates for Bromley. The road now runs through Lee High Road into Eltham Road. The junction with the A210 has an unusually long 41 metre yellow box junction. and continues as the Sidcup Bypass, crossing the A222 at Frognal Corner and the A224 at Crittall's Corner. Entering Kent, it widens from two lanes to three lanes near Swanley and continues onto the M20 motorway.

==== Junctions ====
The main junctions on the London to M25 section are:

- New Cross one-way system (the road starts here and branches from the A2)
- Lewisham Gateway (with the A21, A2210 and A2211)
- Sutcliffe Park (with the A210 to Eltham) – the road becomes a dual carriageway east of this junction
- Clifton's Roundabout (with the A205 South Circular)
- Fiveways, New Eltham (with the B263); this is the last at-grade junction heading out of London
- Frognal Corner (with the A222)
- Crittall's Corner (with the A223 and A224)
- Swanley Interchange (M25 Junction 3 / M20 Junction 1)

=== The M25 to Dover ===
The A20 then passes the racing circuit at Brands Hatch before descending steeply from the North Downs escarpment past Wrotham then West Malling and on to the county town of Maidstone. The route beyond Maidstone travels East, through the villages of Bearsted, Harrietsham, Lenham and Charing to Ashford.

The A292 takes over the former A20 through Ashford itself, then the road emerges as it heads through Willesborough and Sellindge in the direction of Hythe. It takes a sharp turn left at Newingreen (the site of the UK's first motel) before entering Folkestone via Cheriton, passing the vehicular entrance to the Channel Tunnel, forming part of the town's original bypass as the trunk road from the M20. The route then follows the coastline, tunnelling through the hills and descending to the docks in Dover, where it meets the A2 again coming down from Canterbury.

== History ==
Part of the route now followed by the modern road, particularly the western section, was opened as various turnpikes in the 18th century in an effort to improve coaching links between London and the Kent towns.

In the early days of the Great Britain road numbering scheme the A20 ran through Eltham, London. 0.7 miles (1.1 km) along Eltham Road the Sidcup Arterial Road begins, opened in 1923, which carries traffic south of the two towns instead, leaving the A210 and A211 roads following the original route. The nearby town of Swanley was bypassed in 1968, and the short link between the two bypasses was constructed in 1988 (to the south of the Ruxley Corner roundabout).

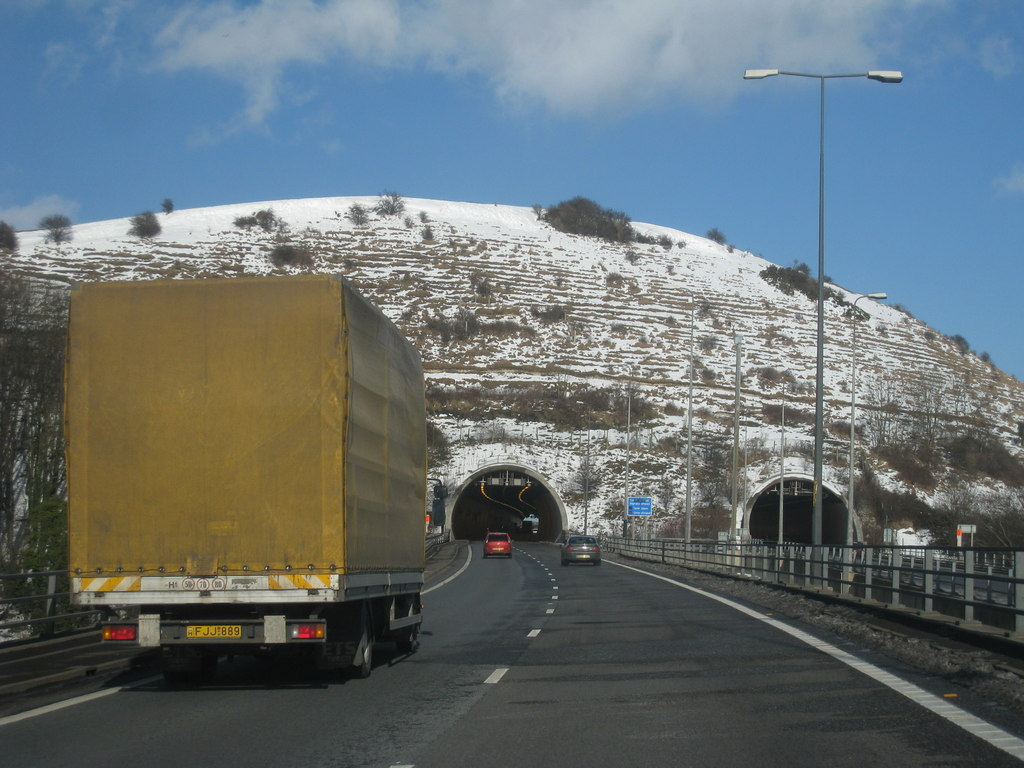
The western portals of the Roundhill Tunnel

A section of the A20 in Ashford formed part of the Ashford By-Pass, a dual carriageway opened in 1957, which used to run from what is now the roundabout with Simone Weil Avenue to the Willesborough roundabout. Simone Weil Avenue is the original A20 bypass, but has been diverted to curtail at Canterbury Road. The eastern end of the old by-pass is now the M20.

The section between Maidstone and Ashford was the only link between the two separate sections of the M20 for 10 years during the 1980s, until the 14-mile (23 km) missing link of the motorway was completed in May 1991.

North of Folkestone the A20 becomes a dual carriageway and enters the Roundhill Tunnel before crossing over and dropping down into Dover. This part of the A20 was completed in 1993 as a project included in the Parliamentary Bill for the Channel Tunnel. During 2011, structural failures in and around the Roundhill Tunnel have caused the A20 to be closed in this area numerous times.

== Junction list ==
=== A20 ===
County	Location	mi	km	Destinations	Notes
Greater London	Lewisham	0.0	0.0	A2 to A202 – Central London, Dover, Peckham	Western terminus
Greater London	Lewisham	1.1– 1.2	1.8– 1.9	A2210 north (Jerrard Street) – Deptford	Southern terminus of A2210
Greater London	Lewisham	1.3	2.1	A21 south-east – Bromley, Catford	North-western terminus of A21
Greater London	Lewisham	1.4	2.3	A2211 north – Greenwich	Southern terminus of A2211
Greater London	London Borough of Lewisham–Greenwich boundary	2.6	4.2	A2212 south (Burnt Ash Road) / B212 (Lee High Road) – Grove Park, Blackheath	B212 and Blackheath signed westbound only; northern terminus of A2212
Greater London	Greenwich	3.2	5.1	A210 east (Eltham Road) / A2213 north (Kidbrooke Park Road) to A205 north / A102 – Eltham, Kidbrooke, Docklands, Woolwich	To A205, A102, Docklands, and Woolwich signed eastbound only; western terminus of A210; southern terminus of A2213
Greater London	Greenwich	3.5	5.6	A205 (South Circular) / A21 / A23 / A102 / A2	To A102, A2, and Docklands signed westbound only
Greater London	Greenwich	4.8	7.7	A208 (Court Road) – Mottingham, Eltham	
Greater London	Bexley–Bromley boundary	7.2– 7.7	11.6– 12.4	A222 – Bromley, Chislehurst, Sidcup	Grade–separated junction
Greater London	Bexley–Bromley boundary	7.9– 8.5	12.7– 13.7	A224 / A223 north-east to B2173 – Orpington, Foots Cray, Bexley, Swanley	To B2173 and Swanley signed eastbound only; grade-separated junction; south-western terminus of A223
Kent	Swanley–Farningham boundary	12.0– 12.6	19.3– 20.3	M25 / M20 east / B2173 – Gatwick Airport, Maidstone	Dover signed eastbound only; western terminus of M20; M25 junction 3; M20 junction 1
Kent	Farningham	13.9	22.4	A225 north / Dartford Road – Dartford, Farningham, Sutton-at-Hone	Sutton-at-Hone signed westbound only; western terminus of A225 concurrency
Kent	Farningham	14.3	23.0	A225 south (Eynsford Road) – Eynsford, Otford, Sevenoaks	A225 and Sevenoaks signed westbound only; eastern terminus of A225 concurrency
Kent	Wrotham	20.6	33.2	A227 north (Gravesend Road) / Pilgrims Way – Gravesend, Meopham, Vigo	Western terminus of A227 concurrency
Kent	Wrotham	20.9	33.6	M20 west / A227 south to M25 – London, Swanley, Tonbridge, Borough Green	Eastern terminus of A227 concurrency
Kent	Wrotham	21.8	35.1	M26 to M20 / M25 / M23 / M4 – Maidstone, Dover, Gatwick Airport, Redhill	M26 junction 2a
Kent	Wrotham Heath	22.2	35.7	A25 west (Maidstone Road) – Sevenoaks, Platt, Borough Green	Eastern terminus of A25
Kent	Leybourne	25.7	41.4	Ashton Way / Castle Way / Oxley Shaw Lane / A228 / M20 / A26 – Rochester, Tonbridge, Kings Hill, Leybourne	
Kent	Aylesford	28.7	46.2	Coldharbour Lane to M20 / A229 – Chatham	To A229 and Chatham signed eastbound only
Kent	Maidstone	30.6– 30.8	49.2– 49.6	A26 south-west (Tonbridge Road) – Tonbridge, Barming	North-eastern terminus of A26
Kent	Maidstone	30.9– 31.0	49.7– 49.9	A229 north to M20 – Chatham	Western terminus of A229 concurrency
Kent	Maidstone	31.5	50.7	A229 south (Upper Stone Street) – Hastings, Shepway, Loose, Tovil	Shepway and Loose signed eastbound only, Tovil westbound only; eastern terminus of A229 concurrency; western terminus of A249 concurrency; southern terminus of A249
Kent	Maidstone	31.8	51.2	A249 north to M20 / A229 – Sheerness, Chatham	Eastern terminus of A249 concurrency
Kent	Hollingbourne	35.6	57.3	M20 – London, Ashford	Destinations signed westbound only; M20 junction 8
Kent	Charing	44.3	71.3	A252 east / School Road to A28 – Canterbury, Chilham, Challock	Challock signed eastbound only; western terminus of A252
Kent	Ashford	49.4	79.5	A28 (Templer Way / Simone Weil Avenue) / A292 (Maidstone Road) – Canterbury, Tenterden, Ashford, Great Chart	North-western terminus of A292
Kent	Ashford	49.8– 50.2	80.1– 80.8	M20 west / A251 north – London, Maidstone, Faversham, Kennington	Kennington signed eastbound only; western terminus of M20 concurrency; southern terminus of A251; M20 junction 9
Kent	Willesborough	52.4– 53.0	84.3– 85.3	M20 east / A2070 / A292 north-west to A28 – Dover, Folkstone, Ashford, Hastings, Canterbury	Eastern terminus of M20 concurrency; south-eastern terminus of A292; M20 junctions 10-10A
Kent	Newingreen	59.4	95.6	A261 south-east (Hythe Road) to A259 – Hythe, Hastings	North-western terminus of A261
Kent	Postling	60.5	97.4	M20 / B2068 – Ashford, London, Folkestone, Dover, Canterbury, Stanford (north)	Direct access eastbound only; M20 junction 11
Kent	Newington	63.2	101.7	Channel Tunnel	No access eastbound
Kent	Folkestone	64.7	104.1	M20 west / Cheriton High Street – Ashford, London, Cheriton, Folkestone	Folkestone signed westbound only; western terminus of M20 concurrency; M20 junction 12
Kent	Folkestone	65.5– 66.1	105.4– 106.4	Folkestone	Eastern terminus of M20 concurrency; eastern terminus of M20; M20 junction 13
Kent	Folkestone	66.4	106.9	Roundhill Tunnel	
Kent	Hawkinge	66.7– 67.2	107.3– 108.1	A260 – Canterbury, Folkestone	Grade–separated junction; Folkestone signed westbound only
Kent	Hougham Without	69.8– 70.4	112.3– 113.3	B2011 – Capel-le-Ferne, West Hougham	Grade–separated junction
Kent	Dover	73.8– 74.0	118.8– 119.1	A256 north (York Street) – Town centre	A256 signed westbound only, Town centre eastbound only; southern terminus of A256
Kent	Dover	74.4	119.7	A2 west / Port of Dover – Canterbury, Deal, Ramsgate, Sandwich	Eastern terminus; eastern terminus of A2
1.000 mi = 1.609 km; 1.000 km = 0.621 mi
