= Listed buildings in Wrotham =

Civil Parish in Kent, England

Wrotham is a village and civil parish in the Tonbridge and Malling district of Kent, England. It contains 64 listed buildings that are recorded in the National Heritage List for England. Of these one is grade I, four are grade II* and 59 are grade II.

This list is based on the information retrieved online from Historic England.

== Key ==
Grade	Criteria
I	Buildings that are of exceptional interest
II*	Particularly important buildings of more than special interest
II	Buildings that are of special interest

== Listing ==
Name	Grade	Location	Type	Completed (Note: The date given is the date used by Historic England as significant for the initial building or that of an important part in the structure's description.)	Date designated	Grid ref. (Note: The grid reference is based on the British national grid reference system, sometimes known as OSGB36, used by the Ordnance Survey.) Geo-coordinates	Notes	Entry number (Note: The "List Entry Number" is a unique number assigned to each listed building and scheduled monument by Historic England.)	Image	Wikidata
Malt House	II	Borough Green Road, TN15 7RA			30 May 1984	TQ6102659024; 51°18′27″N 0°18′32″E		1236290	Upload Photo	Q26529531
Stable 15 Yards to North of the Elms	II	Borough Green Road			30 May 1984	TQ6101759046; 51°18′28″N 0°18′31″E		1236295	Upload Photo	Q26529535
The Hollies	II	Borough Green Road			30 May 1984	TQ6104958745; 51°18′18″N 0°18′32″E		1236288	Upload Photo	Q26529529
The Old Vicarage	II	Borough Green Road			30 May 1984	TQ6102659060; 51°18′28″N 0°18′32″E		1236298	Upload Photo	Q26529538
The Bull Hotel	II	Bull Lane	hotel		1 August 1952	TQ6121559126; 51°18′30″N 0°18′42″E		1264650	The Bull Hotel More images	Q26555326
The Old Palace	II*	Bull Lane			1 August 1952	TQ6128359159; 51°18′31″N 0°18′45″E		1236308	Upload Photo	Q17546965
Stable 30 Yards to the North of Ford Place	II	Ford Lane			1 August 1952	TQ6364758606; 51°18′11″N 0°20′46″E		1236360	Upload Photo	Q26529593
Wall 40 Yards to the North West of Ford Place	II	Ford Lane			1 August 1952	TQ6363458615; 51°18′11″N 0°20′46″E		1264630	Upload Photo	Q26555309
Barn 100 Yards West of Margaret Mcmillan House	II	Graves End Road			30 May 1984	TQ6214160397; 51°19′10″N 0°19′31″E		1236362	Upload Photo	Q26529595
1-3, High Street	II	1-3, High Street			30 May 1984	TQ6104959118; 51°18′30″N 0°18′33″E		1236385	Upload Photo	Q26529618
Bank House Bank House, Old Bank House and Premises Adjoining to East Old Bank House and Premises Adjoining to East	II	High Street			1 August 1952	TQ6113259106; 51°18′30″N 0°18′37″E		1264586	Upload Photo	Q26555272
Dovecote 30 Yards South East of Wrotham Place	II	High Street			1 August 1952	TQ6120659061; 51°18′28″N 0°18′41″E		1236447	Upload Photo	Q26529674
House Immediately to West of the Wrotham Shop	II	High Street			30 May 1984	TQ6112359126; 51°18′30″N 0°18′37″E		1236373	Upload Photo	Q26529606
Sandstone Cottage the Bower House	II	High Street			30 May 1984	TQ6109959122; 51°18′30″N 0°18′36″E		1264608	Upload Photo	Q26555289
Stable Building 10 Yards to the North of Wrotham Place	II	High Street			1 August 1952	TQ6116159114; 51°18′30″N 0°18′39″E		1274852	Upload Photo	Q26564481
Stable Building 80 Yards North East of Wrotham Place	II	High Street			1 August 1952	TQ6121459098; 51°18′29″N 0°18′42″E		1264600	Upload Photo	Q26555283
The George and Dragon Public House	II	High Street	pub		30 May 1984	TQ6106359120; 51°18′30″N 0°18′34″E		1264609	The George and Dragon Public House More images	Q26555290
The Post Office	II	High Street			30 May 1984	TQ6106059102; 51°18′30″N 0°18′34″E		1236401	Upload Photo	Q26529632
The Weavers and Shop Premises to Right	II	High Street			30 May 1984	TQ6108059104; 51°18′30″N 0°18′35″E		1236410	Upload Photo	Q26529641
The Wrotham Shop	II	High Street			30 May 1984	TQ6114159132; 51°18′31″N 0°18′38″E		1264641	Upload Photo	Q26555317
Wall 100 Yards North of Bull Hotel	II	High Street			30 May 1984	TQ6123859230; 51°18′34″N 0°18′43″E		1264639	Upload Photo	Q26555315
Wall, Gate and Gatepiers 20 Yards to North of Wrotham Place	II	Gate And Gatepiers 20 Yards To North Of Wrotham Place, High Street			1 August 1952	TQ6119859115; 51°18′30″N 0°18′41″E		1274854	Upload Photo	Q26564483
West House	II*	High Street			1 August 1952	TQ6103359117; 51°18′30″N 0°18′32″E		1264616	Upload Photo	Q17547019
Wrotham Place	II*	High Street			1 August 1952	TQ6116659083; 51°18′29″N 0°18′39″E		1264591	Upload Photo	Q17547014
Newhouse Farmhouse	II	Kemsing Road, Newhouse Farmhouse			30 May 1984	TQ5997059182; 51°18′33″N 0°17′37″E		1236473	Upload Photo	Q26529700
Town House and East Lodge	II	Kemsing Road			22 June 1988	TQ6096159070; 51°18′29″N 0°18′28″E		1236684	Upload Photo	Q26529896
Yaldham Manor	II	Kemsing Road			1 August 1952	TQ5869658758; 51°18′21″N 0°16′31″E		1236457	Upload Photo	Q26529684
Moat Cottage	II	London Road			30 May 1984	TQ6257758857; 51°18′20″N 0°19′51″E		1236482	Upload Photo	Q26529708
Moat Restaurant	II	London Road	restaurant		30 May 1984	TQ6246158895; 51°18′22″N 0°19′46″E		1236475	Moat Restaurant More images	Q26529701
Court Lodge	II	Old London Road			1 August 1952	TQ6105559288; 51°18′36″N 0°18′34″E		1236483	Upload Photo	Q26529709
Donkey Wheel House 70 Yards to the South of Court Lodge	II	Old London Road			30 May 1984	TQ6110259233; 51°18′34″N 0°18′36″E		1264585	Upload Photo	Q26555271
Hognore Farm House	II	Pilgrim's Way, Hognore			30 May 1984	TQ6248559873; 51°18′53″N 0°19′48″E		1236510	Upload Photo	Q26529736
2, St Mary's Lane	II	2, St Mary's Lane			30 May 1984	TQ6109059058; 51°18′28″N 0°18′35″E		1236511	Upload Photo	Q26529737
Cedar House	II	St Mary's Lane			1 August 1952	TQ6109758735; 51°18′18″N 0°18′35″E		1264539	Upload Photo	Q26555228
Cottage Row Comprising Angel Cottage and 3 to Right	II	St Mary's Lane			30 May 1984	TQ6109959042; 51°18′28″N 0°18′35″E		1264562	Upload Photo	Q26555250
Ivy Hall Farmhouse	II	St Mary's Lane, Ivy Hall Farm			30 May 1984	TQ6107658664; 51°18′16″N 0°18′34″E		1236558	Upload Photo	Q26529779
Normey Cottage	II	St Mary's Lane			30 May 1984	TQ6114558913; 51°18′23″N 0°18′38″E		1236552	Upload Photo	Q26529773
The Almshouses	II	1-4, St Mary's Lane			30 May 1984	TQ6110259025; 51°18′27″N 0°18′36″E		1236528	Upload Photo	Q26529751
The Butchers Shop	II	St Mary's Lane			30 May 1984	TQ6111859003; 51°18′26″N 0°18′36″E		1236550	Upload Photo	Q26529771
The Old Farmhouse	II	St Mary's Lane			30 May 1984	TQ6113158884; 51°18′23″N 0°18′37″E		1236554	Upload Photo	Q26529775
Oak Cottage	II	St Marys Road			2 July 2001	TQ6110359009; 51°18′27″N 0°18′36″E		1245946	Upload Photo	Q26538411
Sycamore Barn	II	St Marys Road, Sevenoaks, TN15 7AJ			30 May 1984	TQ6111458659; 51°18′15″N 0°18′36″E		1236559	Upload Photo	Q26529780
Wall 40 Yards to the North East of Ford Place, That Part in Addington Cp	II	That Part In Addington Cp, Ford Lane			25 February 1987	TQ6366458633; 51°18′12″N 0°20′47″E		1363079	Upload Photo	Q26644927
Bishop's Lodge	II	The Square			1 August 1952	TQ6118759146; 51°18′31″N 0°18′40″E		1236561	Upload Photo	Q26529782
Boundary Wall to South and South-east of Bishop's Lodge	II	The Square			30 May 1984	TQ6118359129; 51°18′30″N 0°18′40″E		1264543	Upload Photo	Q26555232
Chest Tomb 10 Yards East of Church of St George	II	The Square			30 May 1984	TQ6121759186; 51°18′32″N 0°18′42″E		1236609	Upload Photo	Q26529825
Chest Tomb 20 Yards South-east of Church of St George	II	The Square			30 May 1984	TQ6122359174; 51°18′32″N 0°18′42″E		1264525	Upload Photo	Q26555215
Chest Tomb 25 Yards South-east of Church of St George	II	The Square			30 May 1984	TQ6122559165; 51°18′32″N 0°18′42″E		1236605	Upload Photo	Q26529822
Chest Tomb with Panelled Sides 5 Yards South of Church of St George	II	The Square			30 May 1984	TQ6119459173; 51°18′32″N 0°18′41″E		1236591	Upload Photo	Q26529808
Chest Tomb with Reeded Corners 7 Yards South of Church of St George	II	The Square			30 May 1984	TQ6119359169; 51°18′32″N 0°18′41″E		1236600	Upload Photo	Q26529817
Church of St George	I	The Square	church building		25 August 1959	TQ6118359189; 51°18′32″N 0°18′40″E		1236562	Church of St George More images	Q17530269
Green Hill House	II	1 and 2, The Square			30 May 1984	TQ6118159265; 51°18′35″N 0°18′40″E		1236631	Upload Photo	Q26529843
Low Chest Tomb 10 Yards South of Church of St George South Porch	II	The Square			30 May 1984	TQ6119059166; 51°18′32″N 0°18′40″E		1236583	Upload Photo	Q26529801
Low Chest Tomb 10 Yards South of Church of St George South Porch	II	The Square			30 May 1984	TQ6119359165; 51°18′32″N 0°18′41″E		1236587	Upload Photo	Q26680570
Monument 20 Yards South-east of Church of St George	II	The Square			30 May 1984	TQ6121759169; 51°18′32″N 0°18′42″E		1236603	Upload Photo	Q26529820
National Westminster Bank and 2 Premises Adjoining to North	II	The Square			30 May 1984	TQ6114759136; 51°18′31″N 0°18′38″E		1236655	Upload Photo	Q26529868
Pedestal and Shrouded Urn 15 Yards North-east of Church of St George	II	The Square			30 May 1984	TQ6121859198; 51°18′33″N 0°18′42″E		1236628	Upload Photo	Q26529840
The Three Post Boys Public House	II	The Square	pub		30 May 1984	TQ6115459163; 51°18′32″N 0°18′39″E		1236633	The Three Post Boys Public House More images	Q26529845
Wall to South-west of Church of St George	II	The Square			30 May 1984	TQ6117159161; 51°18′31″N 0°18′39″E		1264510	Upload Photo	Q26555200
Railings 10 Yards to the North of Sudbury House	II	West Street, TN15 7AR			30 May 1984	TQ6104359184; 51°18′32″N 0°18′33″E		1236675	Upload Photo	Q26529887
Sudbury House	II	West Street, TN15 7AR			30 May 1984	TQ6104759171; 51°18′32″N 0°18′33″E		1236670	Upload Photo	Q26529882
Wrotham Water Farmhouse	II	Wrotham Water Road			30 May 1984	TQ6296359779; 51°18′50″N 0°20′13″E		1264482	Upload Photo	Q26555174

== See also ==
- Grade I listed buildings in Kent
- Grade II* listed buildings in Kent

== Sources ==
- Newman, John (2012) [1969], Kent: West and the Weald, The Buildings of England, New Haven and London: Yale University Press, ISBN 978-0-300-18509-6
