= M26 motorway =

Motorway in England

M26
- M26 highlighted in blue
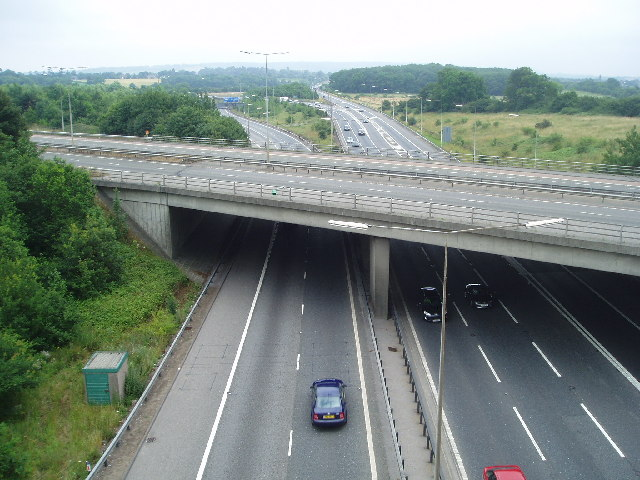
- The M26 as it joins the M25 in 2005. The A21 is crossing above on the bridge.

Route information
- Maintained by National Highways
- Length: 9.9 mi (15.9 km)
- Existed: 1980–present

Major junctions
- West end: Chevening
- M25 motorway Junction 5 M20 motorway Junction 3
- East end: Addington

Location
- Country: United Kingdom
- Primary destinations: Sevenoaks

Road network
- Roads in the United Kingdom; Motorways; A and B road zones
← M25	→ M27

The M26 is a motorway in Kent, England. It is a short link between the M25 at Sevenoaks and the M20 near West Malling, which provides connectivity between southern England and the Channel ports in Kent.

== Route ==
The motorway starts at junction 3 of the M20 and heads west, encountering almost immediately the single junction along its length where it has an interchange with the A20. This junction is numbered 2a to reflect its proximity to the M20's nearby junction 2 (also connecting with the A20) a short distance to the north-west.

8 miles (13 km) to the west the M26 merges with the M25 at junction 5. There is no exit from the M26 at junction 5 and all traffic must join the clockwise (westbound) M25. The next M25 junction, number 6, is 10 miles (16 km) west at Godstone so traffic joining the M26 at junction 2a cannot leave the motorway for 18 miles (29 km), the longest distance between motorway exits in the UK.

On the anti-clockwise direction of the M25, the main carriageway continues directly onto the M26 at junction 5. To remain on the M25, traffic must turn on to the slip road which connects to the M25 spur coming north from Sevenoaks, which is multiplexed with the A21. The awkwardness of junction 5 is a result of the history of the two motorways' planning and construction.

== History ==
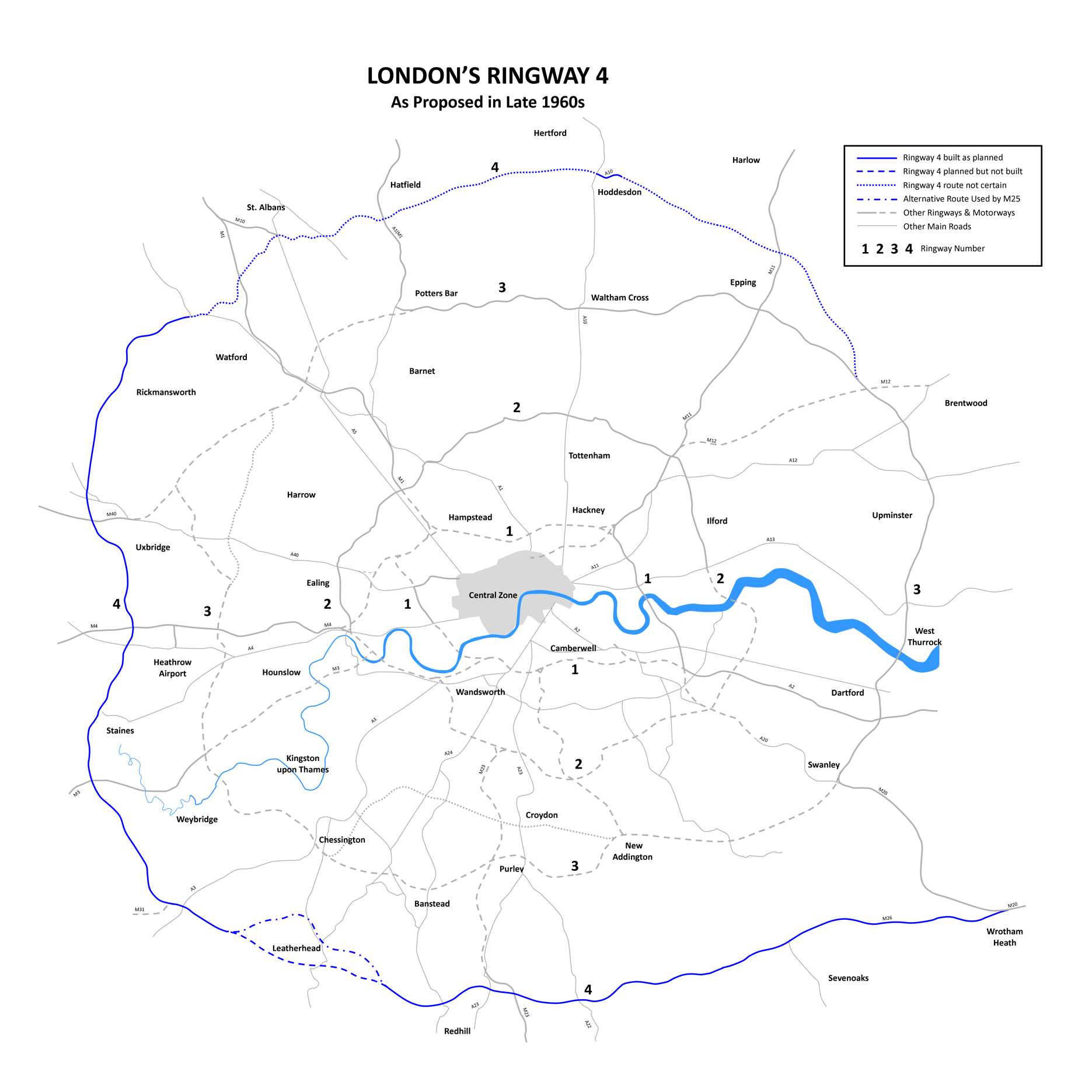
Map of Ringway 4 showing M26 as part of a single route with the M25

Construction of the first part of the M25 began in 1972 but before it opened, plans for the London Orbital motorway were modified to combine the southern and western part of Ringway 4 with the northern and eastern part of Ringway 3. To connect the two separate routes, which together were numbered as the M25, an additional section of road needed to be planned and the M25 route was diverted northwards from junction 5 to meet Ringway 3 at Swanley (M25 junction 3).

The remaining section of Ringway 4 became the M26. Until February 1986, the anticlockwise M25 simply became the M26 at junction 5, as the M25 between junction 5 and junction 3 was not opened until then.

A few hundred metres of the eastern end is the former A20(M).

=== Construction ===
Construction of the M26 began in October 1977, although a route on a similar alignment was originally proposed in the Greater London Plan in 1944 as part of proposed post war improvements to London area transport network. Those proposals were developed further in the 1960s as part of the London Ringways plan and the route of the M26 at that time formed part of Ringway 4 and would have been designated as part of the M25. Construction was slowed down by three wet summers and Gault clay.

It was built by Cementation Ltd, with chief engineer was Ian Watts. It cost £18m. There were 300 people on the project; John Oldham was project manager for the Dunton Green to Wrotham section. There was good weather in 1979. The nearby M20, the West Kingsdown to Addington section, was being built at the same time, by Dowsett. But it would be many years before the nearby M25 was built.

=== Opening ===
It was opened on Tuesday 18 November 1980 at 11am at Wrotham by Norman Fowler, Baron Fowler and Mark Wolfson.

== Proposed developments ==
=== New junction ===
Kent County Council has been in talks with the Highways Agency over a possible new junction with the A225, allowing direct access to Sevenoaks – or access to the A21 at the M25 junction.

=== Brexit contingency planning ===
Plans to modify the M26 to hold large numbers of lorries in the event of a no-deal Brexit were publicly revealed in October 2018.

== Junctions ==
County	Location	mi	km	Junction	Destinations	Notes
Kent	Sevenoaks	0.0	0.0	— (Note: 51.29145°N 0.14282°E)	M25 - Gatwick, Heathrow, Redhill, Bromley A21 - Sevenoaks, Hastings	No access to M25 Anticlockwise or A21 Southbound. No access from A21 Northbound or M25 Clockwise
Kent	Wrotham Heath	8.6; 9.3	13.9; 15.0	2a (Note: 51.30207°N 0.33508°E)	A20 - Wrotham B2016 - Paddock Wood	
Kent	Wrotham Heath	10.3	16.6	— (Note: 51.30733°N 0.35877°E)	M20 - Maidstone, Channel Tunnel, Dover	No access to M20 Northwestbound, no exit from M20 Southeastbound
1.000 mi = 1.609 km; 1.000 km = 0.621 mi

Notes

- Distances in kilometres and carriageway identifiers are obtained from driver location signs/location marker posts. Where a junction spans several hundred metres and the data is available, both the start and finish values for the junction are shown.
- Coordinate data from ACME Mapper.

Coordinate list

== See also ==
- List of motorways in the United Kingdom
