= Wrotham =

Village in Kent, England

Coordinates: 51.30825°N 0.30846°E

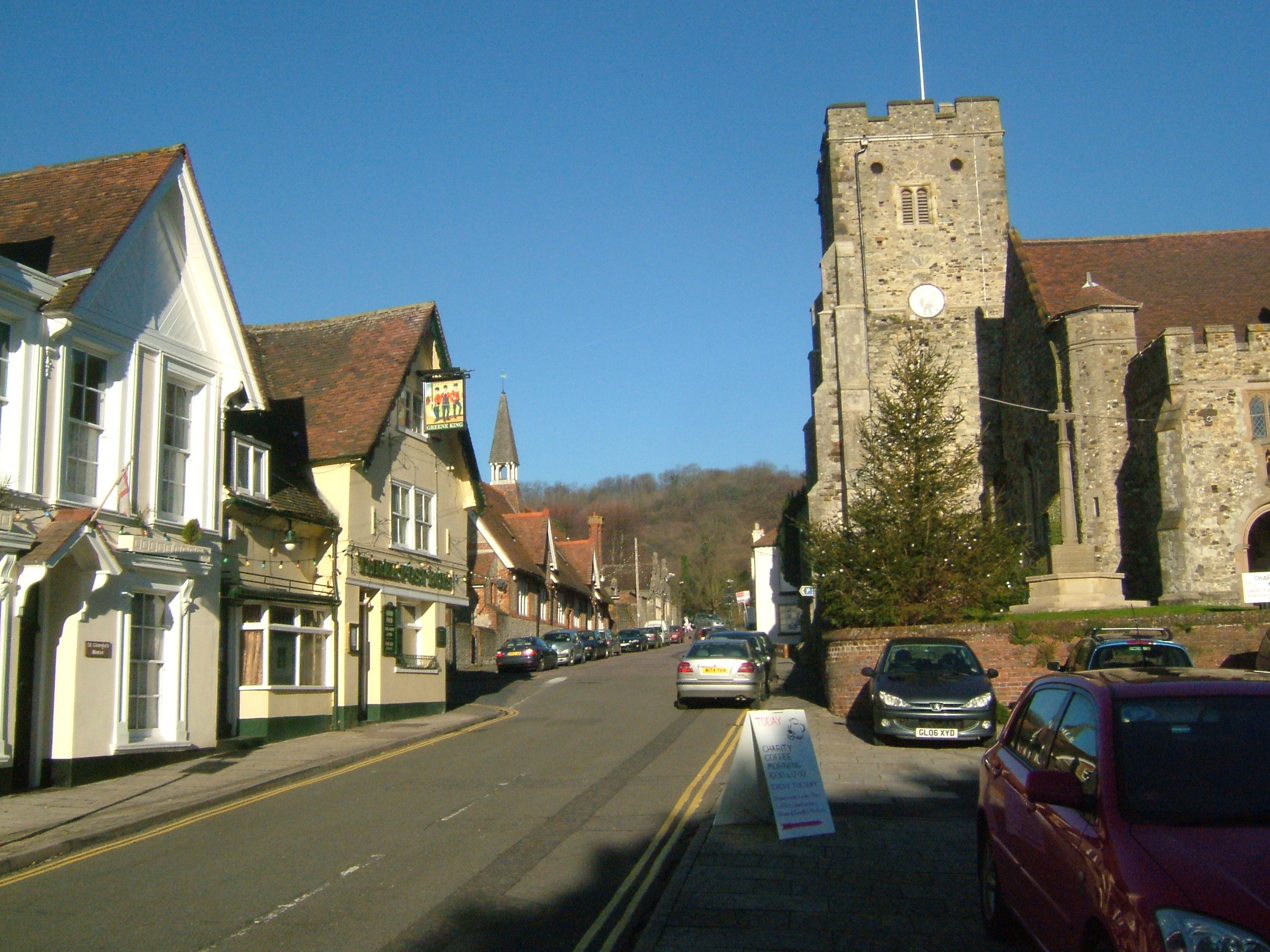
- High Street, Wrotham, showing St George’s Church at right

- Location within Kent
- Population: 1,815 (2001); 1,921 (2011)
- OS grid reference: TQ610591
- District: Tonbridge and Malling
- Shire county: Kent
- Region: South East
- Country: England
- Sovereign state: United Kingdom
- Post town: SEVENOAKS
- Postcode district: TN15
- Dialling code: 01732
- Police: Kent
- Fire: Kent
- Ambulance: South East Coast
- UK Parliament: Tonbridge
- Website: Wrotham Parish Council

Wrotham (/ˈruːtəm/ ROO-təm) is a village on the Pilgrims' Way in Kent, England, at the foot of the North Downs. It is 1 mile (1.6 km) north of Borough Green and approximately 5 miles (8 km) east of Sevenoaks. It is between the M20 and M26 motorways.

== History ==
The name first occurs as Uurotaham in the year 788, meaning 'homestead of a man called Wrōta'. The offshoot village on Wrotham Heath at the heart of the heath of the same name, once an area of wholly common land, is 1 1/2 miles (2.4 km) to the south-east.

Wrotham shows extensive signs of occupation by the Romans and it is posited that the Wrotham Pinot, a disease-resistant variety of the Pinot noir grape found in Wrotham churchyard, is descended from vines brought by the Romans.

The church of St George is Early English and later; nearby is the site of a palace of the Archbishop of Canterbury, maintained until the time of Archbishop Simon Islip (c. 1350).

Wrotham Hill to the north was a main measuring point for the 18th-century trigonometric survey linking the Greenwich Royal Observatory with the Paris Observatory. This Anglo-French Survey (1784–1790) was led by General William Roy.

Close by is the Wrotham transmitting station which was the first transmitter in the UK to broadcast FM radio in 1955 and now carries the main FM and DAB radio services for most of London and Kent.

=== Hundred of Wrotham ===
The parish of Wrotham formed a major part of the Hundred of Wrotham, forming 58% of its area and 61% of its population (1891) The area and population of each parish and the totals for the Hundred were as follows:

Parish	Area (acres)	Pop. 1891
Ightham (/ˈaɪtəm/)	2611	1258
Shipbourne	1922	531
Stansted	1974	372
Wrotham	8883	3437
TOTAL	15390	37220

The Hundred of Wrotham was one of the hundreds of the Lathe of Aylesford.

== Governance ==
Wrotham is a civil parish within the local government district of Tonbridge and Malling, a part of the County of Kent. The parish has 8 councillors elected at-large. Tonbridge & Malling Council is responsible for running local services, such as recreation, refuse collection and council housing; while Kent County Council is responsible for education, social services and trading standards. Both councils are involved in town planning and road maintenance. Wrotham is part of the Electoral Division of Malling West of Kent County Council.

A 2008 report showed that Wrotham experienced one of the greatest deteriorations of basic services, losing the most amenities in the previous four years.

Wrotham is in the parliamentary constituency of Tonbridge and is represented by the Conservative Tom Tugendhat.

=== Administrative history ===
Wrotham was an ancient parish, and was formerly significantly larger than it is today, also including Borough Green, Platt, Plaxtol and Stansted. Stansted became a separate civil parish sometime before the nineteenth century. In 1863 the parish of Wrotham was made a local government district, governed by a local board. Such districts were reconstituted as urban districts in 1894.

Although named after Wrotham, the urban district council was always based in Borough Green, which was growing to become the largest settlement in the parish following the opening of Wrotham railway station there in 1874 (renamed Borough Green and Wrotham in 1962). The council met at the Railway Hotel until 1902, then at a converted house it leased at 2 Sevenoaks Road from 1902 until 1924, before building its own headquarters at 16–18 Maidstone Road in 1924. Wrotham Urban District was abolished in 1934, with the area being absorbed into Malling Rural District and divided into the parishes of Borough Green (which also took some territory from Ightham), Platt, Plaxtol and Wrotham. Malling Rural District in turn was abolished in 1974 to become part of Tonbridge and Malling.

== Demography ==
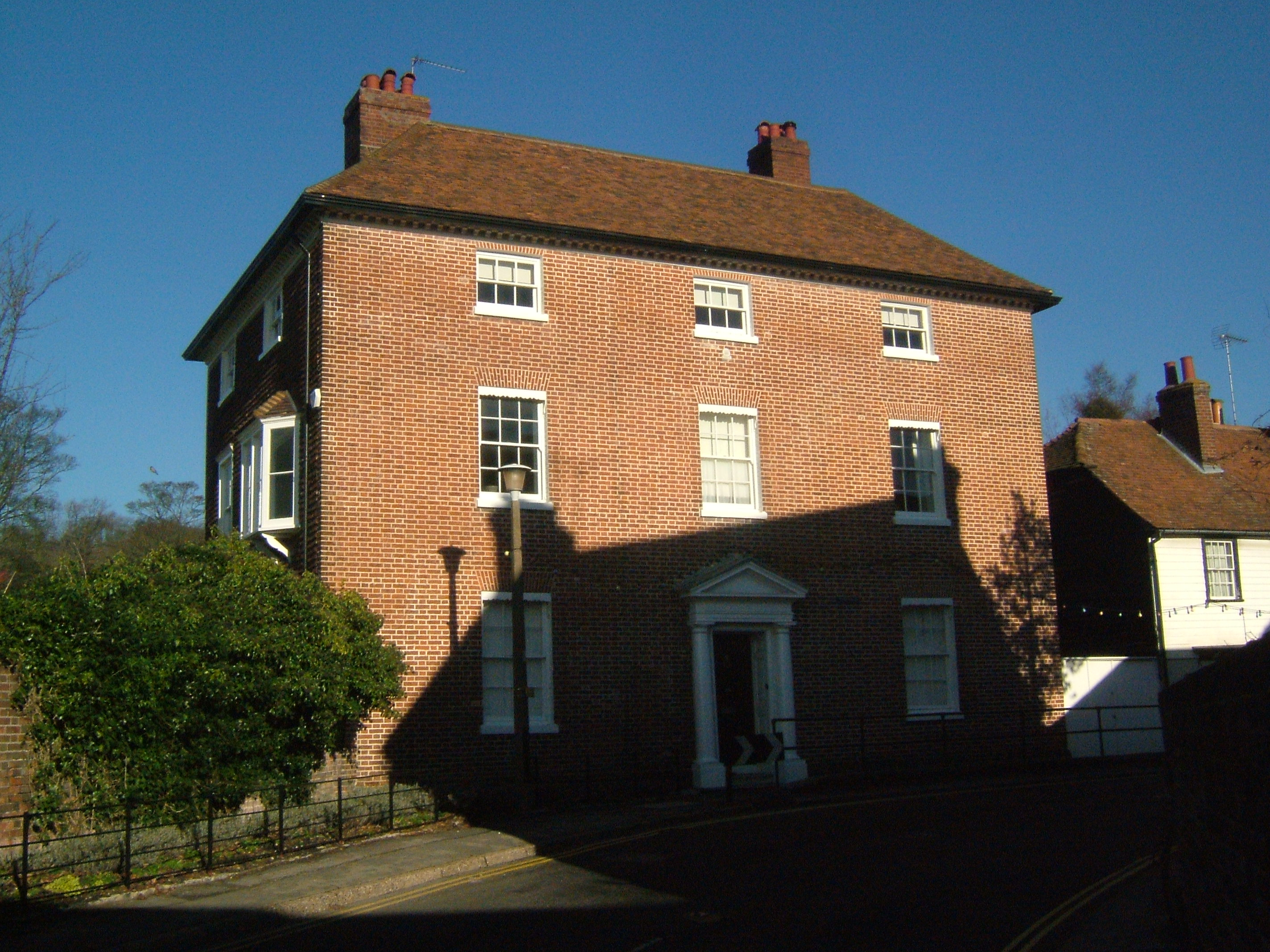
A substantial village house

Wrotham compared
	Wrotham	Tonbridge & Malling district	England
Population	1,815	107,561	49,138,831
UK born	95.9%	95.4%	91.8%
White	99%	98%	91%
Asian	0.0%	0.5%	4.6%
Black	0.16%	0.14%	2.3%
Christian	75%	76%	72%
Muslim	0.2%	0.3%	3.1%
Hindu	0.0%	0.2%	1.1%
Source: 2001 UK census

At the 2001 UK census, the Wrotham ward had a population of 1,815. The village had 759 households; of which, 42% were married couples, 29% were individuals, 9% were cohabiting couples, and 6% were lone parent families. 20% of households had someone at pensionable age living alone.

The ethnicity of the village was given as 99.2% white, 0.66% mixed race, and 0.16% Black. The place of birth of the town's residents was 95.9% United Kingdom (92.0% England), 0.4% Republic of Ireland, 0.8% other Western Europe, 0.4% Eastern Europe, 1.0% Africa, 0.8% Asia, 0.4% North America and 0.3% elsewhere.

Religion was recorded as 74.81% Christian, 0.44% Jewish, 0.22% Buddhist, 0.17% Muslim and 0.17% Sikh. 15.46% were recorded as having no religion, 0.33% had an alternative religion, and 8.42% did not state their religion.

== Economy ==
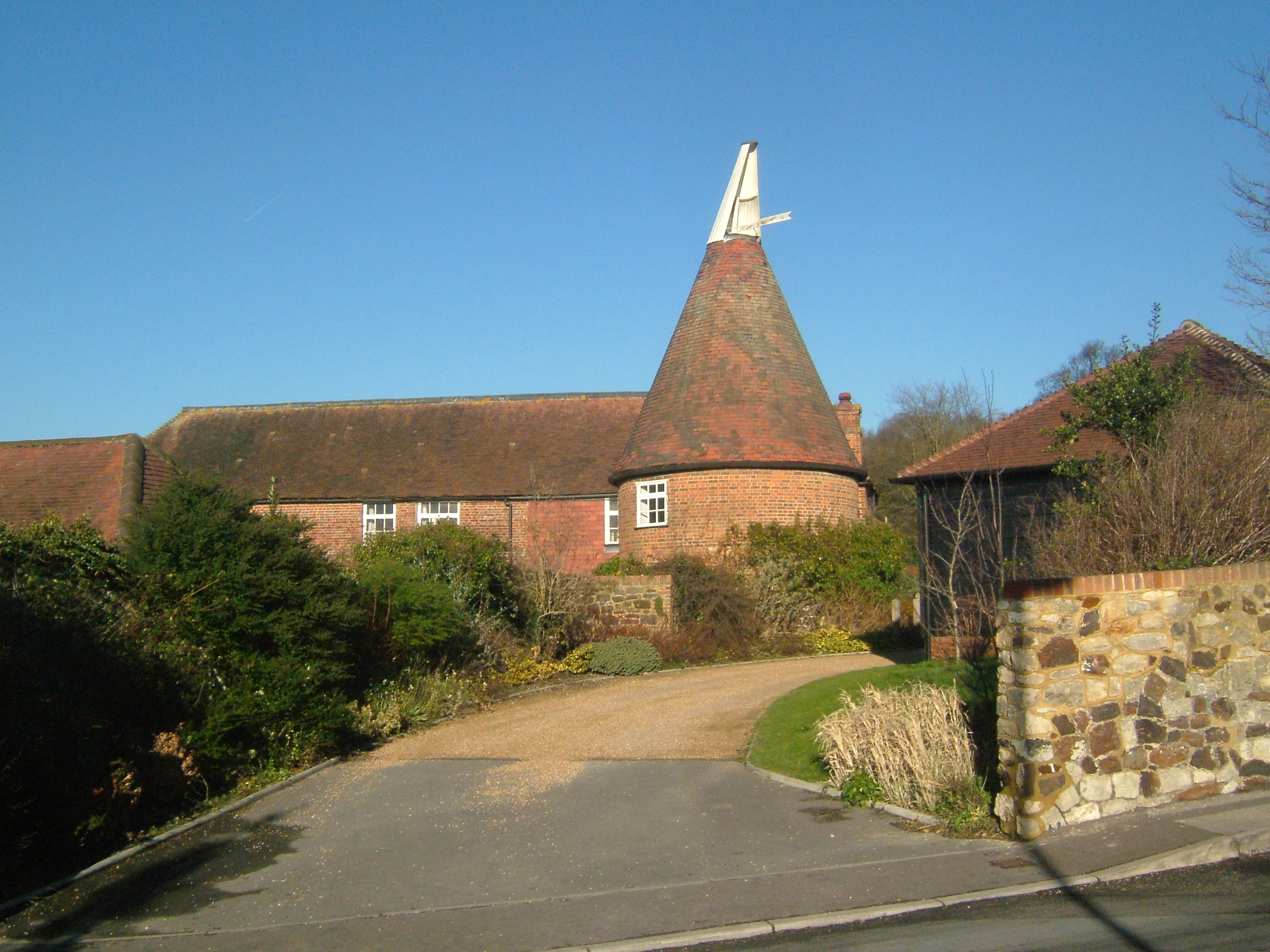
A converted oast house, showing the transition from agricultural to residential

At the 2001 UK census, 39.5% of the village's residents aged 16–74 were employed full-time, 12.9% employed part-time, 14.1% self-employed and 1.6% unemployed, while 1.9% were students with jobs, 3.4% students without jobs, 14.3% retired, 8.0% looking after home or family, 2.5% permanently sick or disabled and 1.9% economically inactive for other reasons. Compared to national figures, the village had a low rate of unemployment, and a high proportion of self-employed workers.

Employment by industry was 16% retail; 14% real estate; 13% manufacturing; 10% construction; 8% health and social work; 8% education; 7% transport and communications; 5% finance; 5% hotels and restaurants; 3% public administration; 3% agriculture; 1% energy and water supply; and 6% other. Compared to national figures, Wrotham had a high percentage of workers in agriculture; energy and water supply; hotels and restaurants; and construction. It had a low percentage in health and social work; and public administration.

According to Office for National Statistics estimates, the average gross income of households in Wrotham between April 2001 and March 2002 was £770 per week (£40,000 per year).

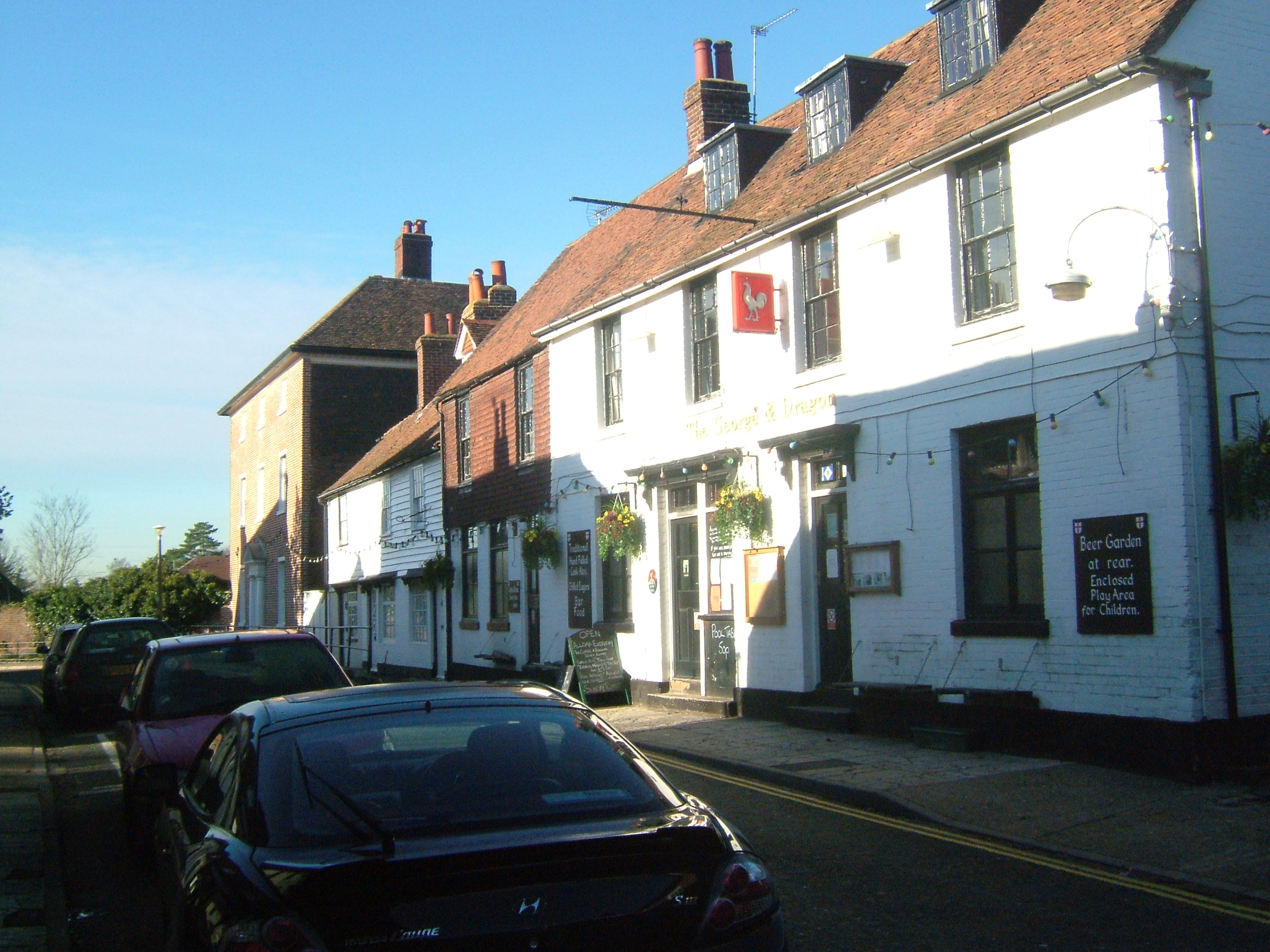
The George and Dragon pub, on the High Street

== Notable people ==
- Peaches Geldof, English journalist, television presenter and model, lived in Wrotham. She died at her home in 2014
- Field Marshal Henry Hardinge, 1st Viscount Hardinge (1785–1856), British Army officer and politician, was born in the village
- Lieutenant Colonel Alfred Wintle (1897–1966), British Army officer and noted eccentric, died in the village

== See also ==
- Listed buildings in Wrotham
