= Wrotham Heath =

Coordinates: 51.29765°N 0.34379°E

- Location within Kent
- OS grid reference: TQ635580
- Civil parish: Wrotham
- District: Tonbridge and Malling
- Shire county: Kent
- Region: South East
- Country: England
- Sovereign state: United Kingdom
- Post town: SEVENOAKS
- Postcode district: TN15
- Dialling code: 01732
- Police: Kent
- Fire: Kent
- Ambulance: South East Coast
- UK Parliament: Tonbridge

Wrotham Heath /ˈruːtəmˈhiːθ/ is a settlement in the borough of Tonbridge and Malling in Kent, England. It is part of the civil parish of Wrotham, and is approximately 2 miles (3.2 km) south-east of the village of Wrotham, 7 miles (11 km) east of Sevenoaks, and 7 miles (11 km) west of Maidstone. It is located on the A20 road, close to the junction between the M20 and M26 motorways. Wrotham Heath Golf Club was founded in 1906.
