= M20 motorway =

Motorway in Kent, England

M20
- M20 highlighted in blue
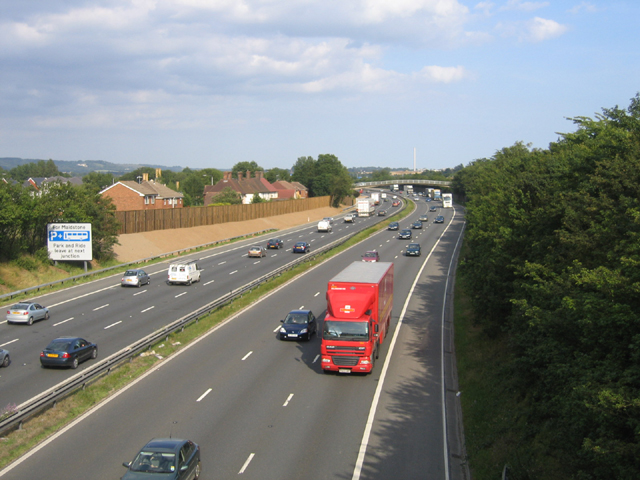
- Looking east near Aylesford, 2006

Route information
- Part of E15
- Maintained by National Highways
- Length: 50.6 mi (81.4 km)
- Existed: 1971–present
- History: Opened: 1960 (as A20(M)); Renumbered: 1971; Completed: 1991

Major junctions
- West end: Swanley
- J1 → M25 motorway J3 → M26 motorway
- East end: Folkestone

Location
- Country: United Kingdom
- Counties: Kent
- Primary destinations: London; Maidstone; Ashford; Channel Tunnel; Folkestone

Road network
- Roads in the United Kingdom; Motorways; A and B road zones
← M18	→ M23

The M20 is a motorway in Kent, England. It follows on from the A20 at Swanley, meeting the M25, and continuing on to Folkestone, providing a link to the Channel Tunnel and the ports at Dover. It is 50.6 miles (81.4 km) long. Although not signposted in England, this road is part of the European route E15. It is also used as a holding area for goods traffic when traffic across the English Channel is disrupted, such as Operation Stack and Operation Brock.

== Route ==
The road starts at its junction with the M25 motorway and A20 road just east of Swanley, then continues south east across the River Darent, north of Farningham through the North Downs, past West Kingsdown and Wrotham where the M26 merges with it. It then strikes east, running north of Addington. After it reaches junction 4 it passes south of New Hythe and runs parallel to the Medway Valley railway line before crossing it close to junction 5. This next section was the old Maidstone bypass. The High Speed 1 (HS1) railway line then runs parallel to the motorway as it continues to the north of Bearsted, crosses the Swanley to Ashford (via Maidstone East) line then out into the countryside north of Leeds Castle. Proceeding south of Lenham and Charing it is crossed by the Ashford and HS1 railway lines before becoming the Ashford bypass. Travelling past Brabourne Lees it is once again joined by HS1 and the East Stour.

Just north of Saltwood it reaches the Channel Tunnel terminal and is crossed by HS1 for the last time. The final section runs along the northern suburbs of Folkestone, giving access to the A20 to Dover.

== History ==
=== Construction ===
The M20 was, in common with many United Kingdom motorways, opened in stages:

Junctions 5 to 7 (the old Maidstone By-Pass) first opened in 1960. The road was then being extended east, to the site of the 'Old England' pub on the A20 at Hollingbourne Corner, which became junction 8, a temporary terminus until 1992. It would cost £1.5 million for the eastern section 5.25 miles (8.4 km) to open by the end of March 1960, built by Costain, designed by Scott Wilson. Work was initiated on the Bearsted by-pass section from Hollingbourne on Monday 5 May 1958 by Richard Nugent, Baron Nugent of Guildford, this was only five weeks after the M1 had started. It was one of three main motorway / by-pass projects started in 1958. The section was intended to open on 27 March 1960, but was late. On Wednesday 1 June 1960, 5 miles (8.0 km) was opened at Forstal (A229) (junction 5) by Sir Leslie Doubleday, chairman of Kent County Council. Maidstone already had a narrow by-pass road, no more than a rural lane crossing the Medway by the medieval bridge at Aylesford – then numbered the A2011, which largely followed the line of the A20(M) bypass. There followed a short section of the A20(M) west of the A229 with a temporary terminus on the A2011 at the A20 near Preston Hall (British Legion Village).

Junctions 7 to 8 fully opened in 1961. It was 1.5 miles (2.4 km), to take 15 months, planned for October 1960. The contract of £822,928 in March 1959 was given to Sir Robert McAlpine. Piles were constructed by West's Piling & Construction, of Harmondsworth. Work was started on Monday 13 April 1959 by Harold Watkinson near Cobtree Manor. The bridge across the Medway cost £200,000. The section opened on 3 December 1960. Coldharbour Lane temporary junction was widened to 33 feet (10 m), with a roundabout on the A20, with a terminus of the A20(M) 0.5 miles (0.80 km) north along Coldharbour Lane (junction 5). It was the south of England's first motorway.

Junctions 3 to 5, the 6.5-mile Ditton, Kent bypass, costing £4.4m, began construction in January 1970 by Costain. The Ditton bypass opened on Tuesday December 7 1971.

These sections of the M20 were known as the 'Maidstone Bypass'. This road was then numbered as the A20(M) as it bypassed the stretch of A20 through Maidstone town centre which was renumbered A2020. This was the first stretch of motorway to open south of London. Plans for a bypass of Maidstone had existed since the 1930s, originally as an all-purpose project, before being upgraded to motorway standard in the 1950s. When the motorway was extended westwards towards London in the 1970s, it was renamed M20 and the A2020 reverted to A20.

- Junctions 3 to 5 were opened in 1971
- Junctions 1 to 2 were opened in 1977, the West Kingsdown to Addington section 7 miles (11 km). It was constructed by Dowsett, with project manager Keith Haddock. The good weather in 1976 had helped

This section ended at a temporary junction near West Kingsdown.

- Temporary terminus to junction 3 in 1980 – this section of the route was difficult to construct due to its steep descent down the North Downs escarpment.
- Sellindge to junction 13 in 1981 – constructed by McAlpines
- Junction 9 to Sellindge in 1981 – constructed by Dowsett

The section around Ashford (junctions 9–10) was originally the A20 Ashford Bypass with actual construction having started before World War 2 – although the route itself was not opened until 19 July 1957. The bypass started at Willesborough near the current location of junction 10 and terminated south of the existing junction 9 at the current Drover's Roundabout. A section of the old bypass is still visible now named Simone Weil Avenue. The original bridge that brought Canterbury Road over the bypass is still visible as the bridge was not reconstructed when the motorway was constructed. This section of motorway has no hard shoulder indicating the smaller width of the old bypass.

This left the motorway in two sections, with the 14-mile (23 km) gap running via the A20 – this was referred to locally as 'The Missing Link'. The level of traffic was not considered necessary to complete the route. Most of the traffic for the Channel ports was using the A2/M2 route. When the Channel Tunnel was ready for construction, it was decided to complete the M20 between junctions 8 and 9 and this opened in 1991. Concurrent to this was the extension to Dover as part of the A20 which opened in 1993. A new junction 11A was also constructed to serve the Channel Tunnel.

=== Operation ===
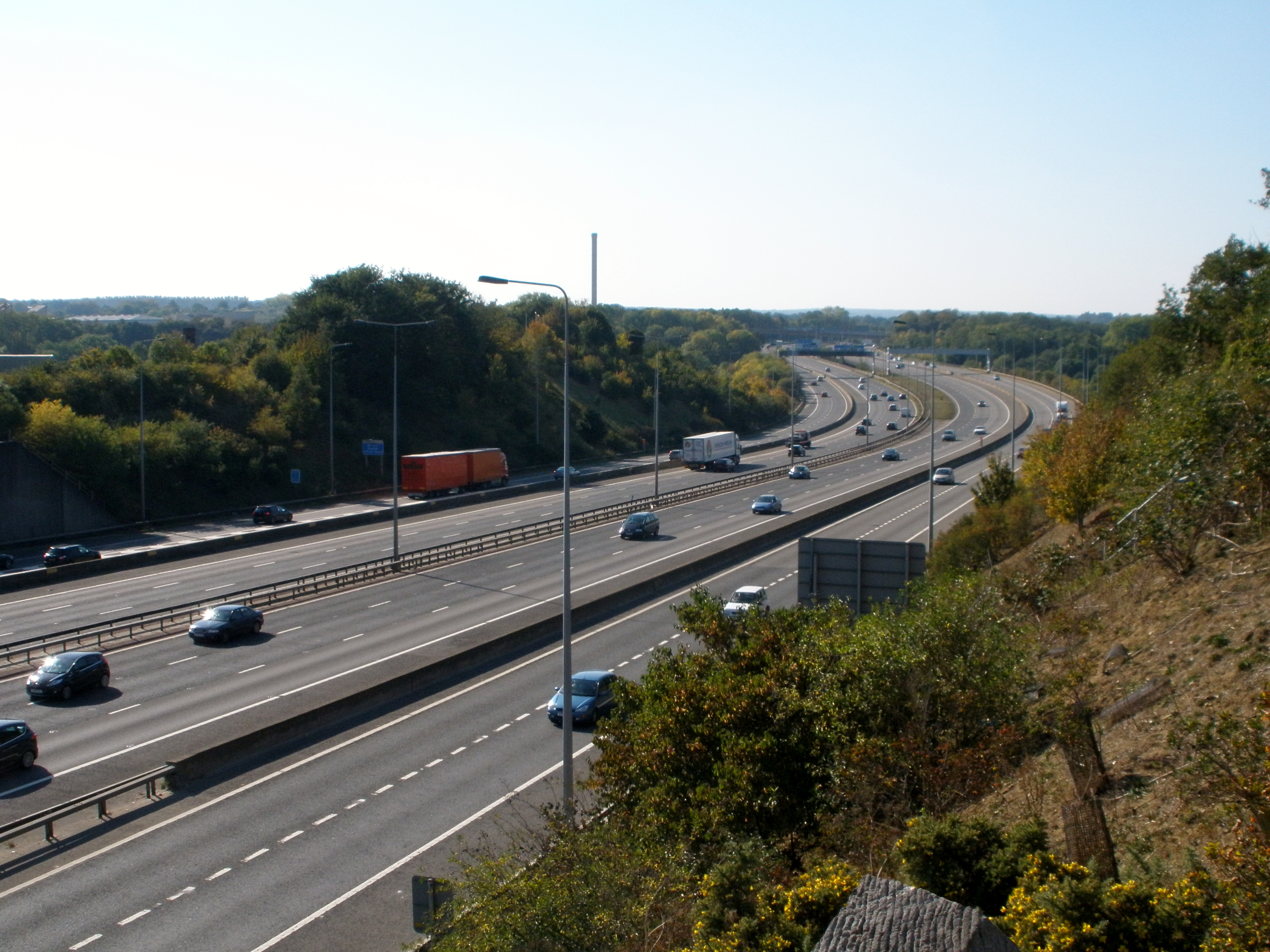
M20 near Maidstone showing separated distributor roads

Following completion of the junction 8 to 9 section, the M20 was three lanes either side of the original A20(M) section. This was a bottleneck, so it was decided to widen this section of motorway. The road here was increased to a dual three- or four-lane road with two-lane distributor roads either side. This section was opened in 1995.

To the north of Maidstone, there is an overlap between the slip roads for junctions 5 (A20) and 6 (A229).

Between 2006 and 2007, junction 10 near Ashford was remodelled to increase capacity when the bridges across the motorway were modified to provide three lanes of traffic at the roundabout, and local approach roads were widened, with new traffic lights to control traffic flows at the junction between the A292 Hythe Road and the London-bound M20 entry slip road. A new footbridge was also constructed across the motorway. The cost was £4.9 million.

A Controlled motorway scheme was introduced in West Kent between junctions 4 and 7, with variable speed limits.

In August 2016, part of a pedestrian footbridge connecting areas of Ryarsh divided by the motorway was brought down – initially suspected to be the result of an impact by a digger from nearby works to widen the southbound bridge at junction 4 being carried on a low-loader that was moving along the hard shoulder. In the incident, the southern section of the bridge – which rested on a plinth south of the motorway and the cantilevered northern section – was dislodged and fell onto the carriageway below, landing on the trailer of a passing HGV and being narrowly avoided by a motorcyclist who suffered broken ribs taking avoiding action. Both carriageways of the motorway were closed to enable the removal of the broken section. The motorway reopened with the Highways Agency having declared that the northern part of the bridge was structurally intact. However this section of the motorway was again closed on the weekend of 3 and 4 September 2016 for the demolition and clearance of the northern bridge element. A replacement pedestrian and cycle bridge was opened in March 2021 at a cost of around £1.5 million.

The Highways Agency proposed a new M20 junction 10a and link road to the A2070 at Ashford in Kent, east of junction 10, to support the development of South Ashford which has been identified as a growth area in the South East. In May 2012, it was announced that the scheme would be postponed for the short-term future. Planning recommenced in 2016. Work started on building the scheme in January 2018, with works planned to complete in May 2020. The coast-facing sliproads at the existing junction 10 were closed to allow the final works on the London-facing sliproads at junction 10a and the new junction opened on 31 October 2019.

== Operation Stack and Operation Brock ==
Since the opening of the Channel Tunnel, sections of the M20 have been used occasionally for the implementation of Operation Stack, should the ferries and/or Channel Tunnel stop running. This closes that part of the motorway and uses the area as a lorry park until the ferries and/or Channel Tunnel are fully running again.

Operation Brock was the replacement for Stack, to be used in the event of no-deal Brexit.

In July 2020, the government announced that it had bought a site beside junction 10A to build the Sevington customs clearance facility and lorry park.

== Junctions ==
Data from driver location signs are used to provide distance in kilometres and carriageway identifier information. Where a junction spans several hundred metres and start and end points are available, both are cited.

M20 motorway junctions
mile (km)	Westbound exits (B carriageway)	Junction	Eastbound exits (A carriageway)
	Road continues as A20 London (SE), Lewisham A20	J1	Dartford Crossing, Gatwick M25; West Kingsdown A20; Swanley B2173; Non-motorway traffic
17.8 (28.7)	Dartford Crossing M25; Central London (A2); Swanley B2173	J1	Start of motorway
26.2 (42.2); 26.3 (42.4)	No access	J2	Paddock Wood A20 (B2016); Gravesend, Tonbridge (A227); Wrotham
28.1 (45.3); 28.5 (45.8)	M26 (M25 (CW)); Heathrow, Gatwick; Sevenoaks (A25)	J3	No access
30.9 (49.7); 31.3 (50.3)	West Malling, Rochester, Tonbridge A228	J4	West Malling, Rochester, New Hythe A228
33.6 (54.1); 34.1 (54.8)	Aylesford A20	J5	Maidstone, Aylesford A20
35.4 (56.9)	Maidstone, Chatham A229	J6	Maidstone, Chatham A229
36.8 (59.2); 37.2 (59.8)	Maidstone, Sittingbourne, Sheerness A249	J7	Maidstone, Sheerness A249
40.2 (64.7); 40.5 (65.1)	Maidstone (East) A20	J8	Lenham A20
53.6 (86.3); 54.1 (87.0)	Ashford A20; Tenterden, Canterbury A28; Faversham A251	J9	Ashford A20; Faversham A251
56.2 (90.5); 56.5 (91.0)	No access	J10	Ashford A292
	Ashford A292; Hastings A2070	J10a	Hastings A2070
63.1 (101.5); 63.5 (102.2)	Canterbury B2068; Hythe (A261)	J11	Canterbury B2068; Hythe (A261)
65.7 (105.8)	No access	J11a	Channel Tunnel (Local access to Lyminge)
66.8 (107.5); 67.0 (107.8)	Cheriton, Channel Tunnel A20	J12	Cheriton, Channel Tunnel A20
68.0 (109.4); 68.1 (109.6)	Start of motorway	J13	Folkestone A20
	Folkestone A20	J13	Road continues as A20 to Dover

== See also ==
- List of motorways in the United Kingdom
- Great Britain road numbering scheme
- Category:M20 motorway service stations
