= Borough Green =

Civil parish in Kent, England

Coordinates: 51.291300°N 0.306200°E

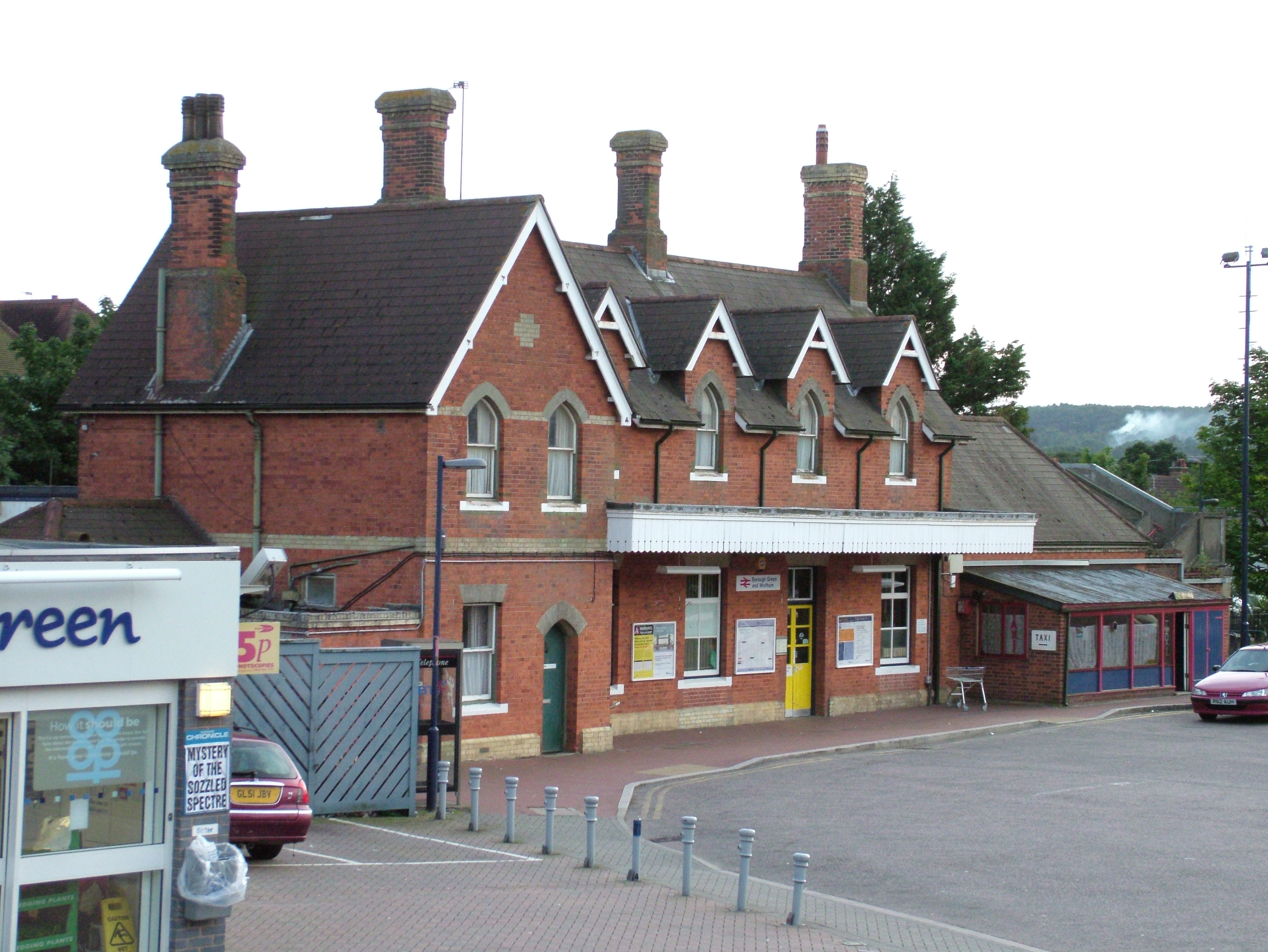
- Borough Green & Wrotham railway station

- Location within Kent
- Population: 4,554 (2011 Census)
- OS grid reference: TQ605575
- District: Tonbridge and Malling
- Shire county: Kent
- Region: South East
- Country: England
- Sovereign state: United Kingdom
- Post town: SEVENOAKS
- Postcode district: TN15
- Dialling code: 01732
- Police: Kent
- Fire: Kent
- Ambulance: South East Coast
- UK Parliament: Tonbridge

Borough Green is a civil parish in the borough of Tonbridge and Malling in Kent, England. The central area is situated on the A25 road between Maidstone and Sevenoaks, with the M26 motorway running through the centre dividing Wrotham and Borough Green.

== History ==
=== Pre-Roman ===
Two Paleolithic rock shelters were found at Oldbury Hill some two miles west of Borough Green with flint tools from about 50,000 years BCE.

=== Roman remains ===
Roman cinerary urns were first found in Barrow Field off Staley's Road in 1839 but were reburied and lost to history. In the 1880s there was a more important find on location north of the railway station where sand was being excavated. In 1898 a local archaeologist Benjamin Harrison of Ightham persuaded the owners to stop destroying them. He called in George Payne who identified them as Roman. There was a Roman cemetery consisting of rows of cinerary urns six feet apart and two feet deep. The burials date from around the year 100 CE.

=== Historical inns ===
The first record of this name was in 1575, when it appears as Borrowe Grene. Middle English grene means village green The name itself is much older. It is not known if this from Old English burh 'manor, borough' or from beorg 'hill, mound'.

The name of the community describes what it originally was – a green to which the people of the area went for sports and games. There is also a view that "borough", which predates any borough council in the area, relates to the word barrow, possibly referring to the Roman remains near the station site.

Its location at a crossroads with the old route from Gravesend to Hastings meant that inns were gradually opened. The Red Lion, originally the "White Bear", first mentioned in 1586, is now closed. The 1592 Black Bull became the Black Horse, then The Black Horse and Hooden, and recently The Black Horse again. The Bull of 1753 survives, but the "Red Lion", Fox and Hounds (1837) and The Rock (1860) have been turned into private housing. The Red Lion building still exists as part of the Red Lion Square housing development. The Fox and Hounds and the Rock were demolished to make way for Foxlea and Tavern Close respectively. The 1878 Railway Hotel, later The Henry Simmonds, is now a Sainsbury's Local food store.

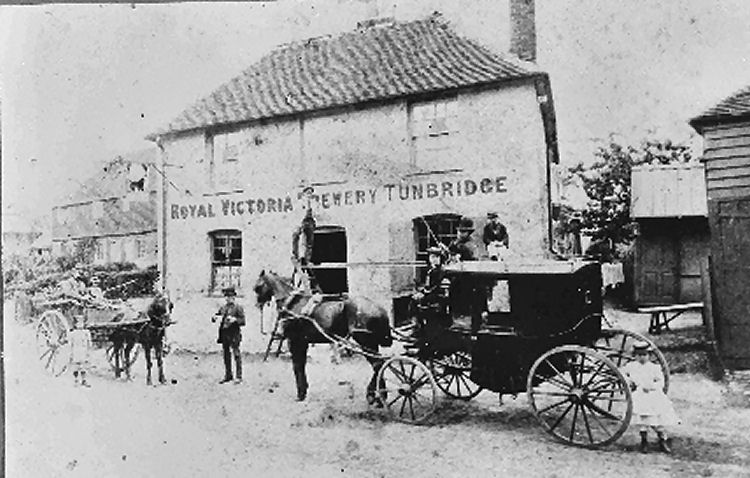
The Red Lion, once the White Bear, dates back to 1576. This front section is 19th Century. It closed in 2007 and the building and its garden and car park were later transformed into housing - Red Lion Square

=== Nineteenth century ===
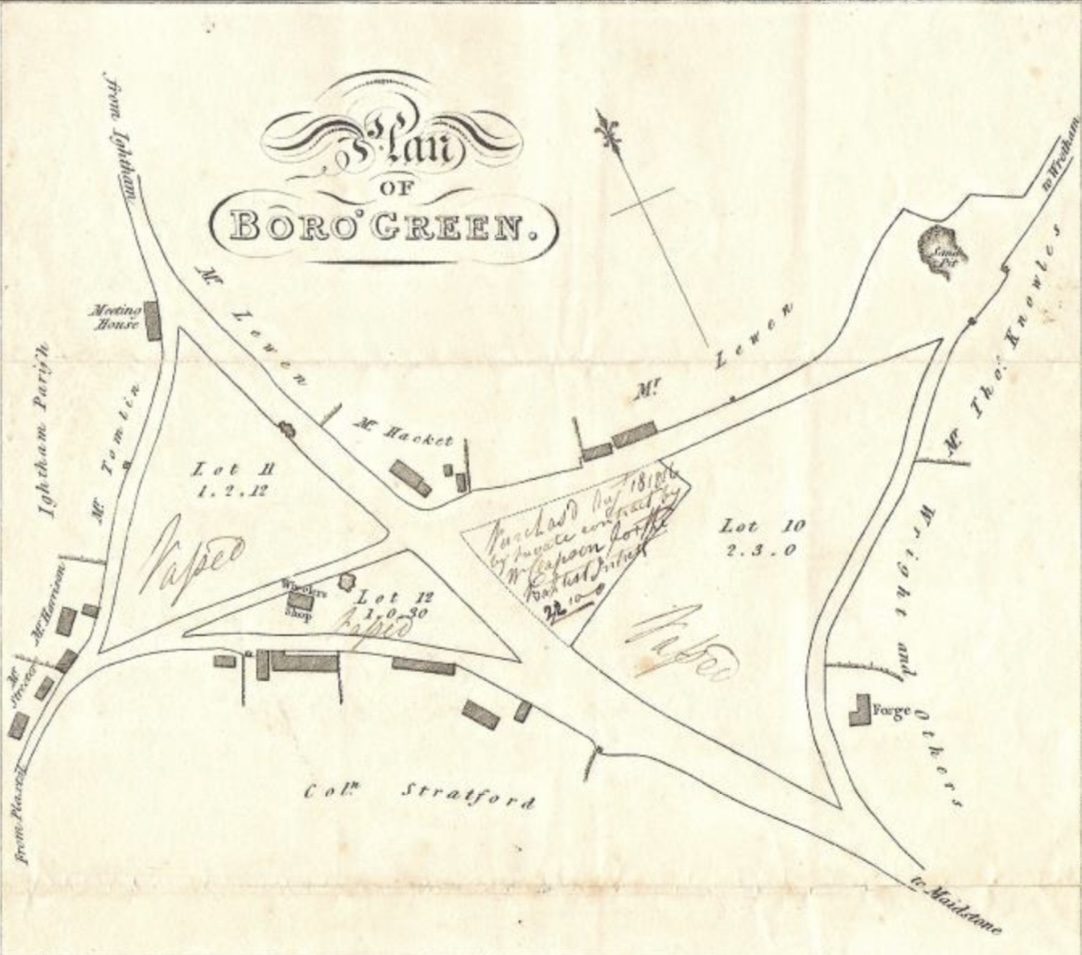
Early 19th Century map of Borough Green showing the purchase of the future Baptist plot in 1816

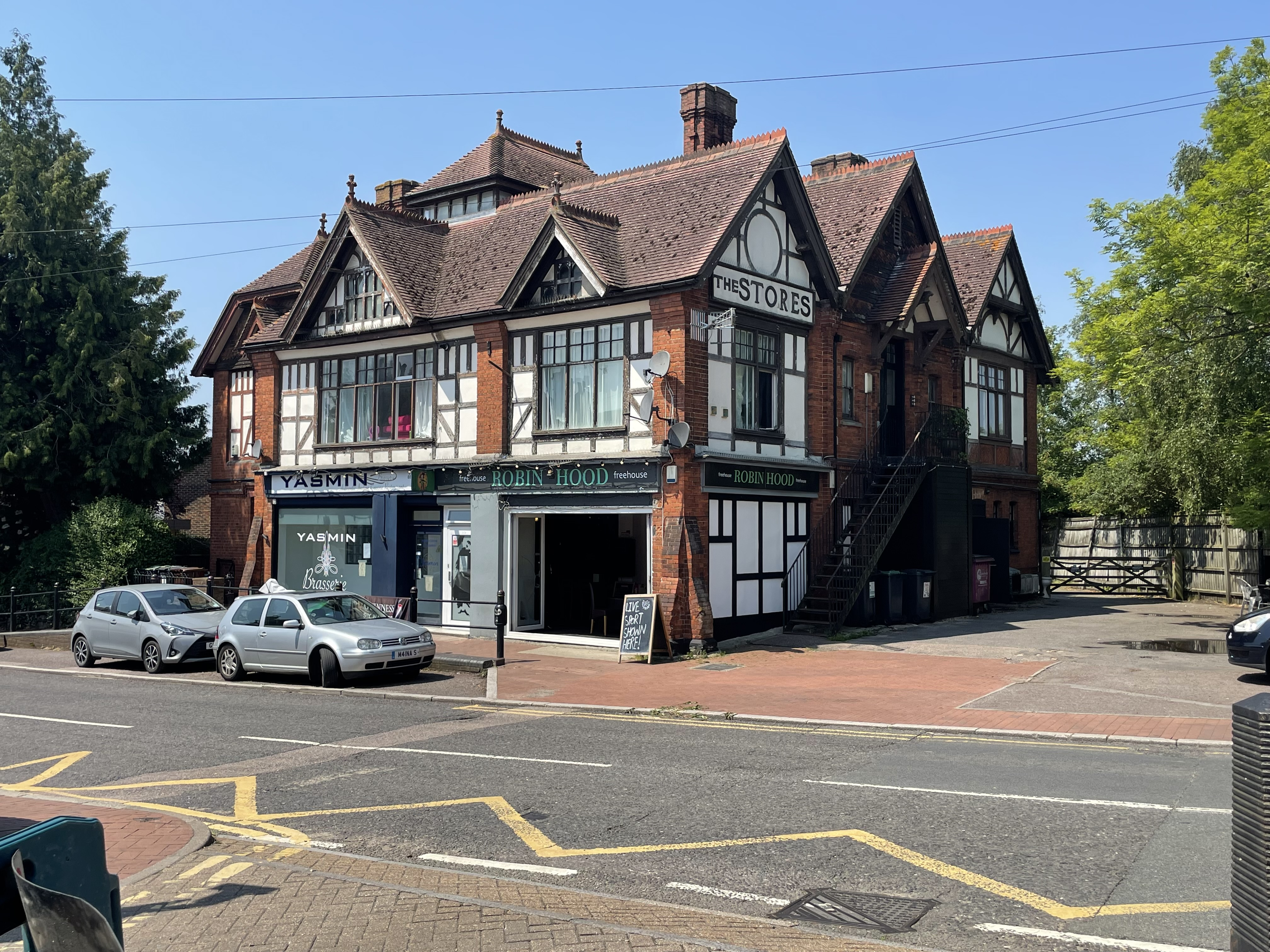
Bridge House, later Clokes department store, was built circa 1887/1889 by Joseph Walls, whose firm bought most of Yew Tree Farm. There is currently one of Borough Green's two pubs and a takeaway (presently closed) on the site

In Borough Green there were 360 residents in 1841, 241 in 1861, 232 in 1871. The village expanded after the railway opened and in 1891 there were 682 inhabitants.

The London, Chatham and Dover Railway opened a line to Maidstone on 1 June 1874, and a station named Wrotham and Borough Green was built. Later the names were reversed to Borough Green and Wrotham, in line with the position of the station within Borough Green, and the fact that Borough Green had outgrown Wrotham.

An infant school was built on the direction of the local school board in 1875 to the design of architect Robert Wheeler.

Western Road was planned in 1877 after the sale of 56 acres of land by the Tomlyn family between the High Street and Fairfield. Town gas was provided by the Wrotham and Borough Green Gas Co from 1880 and in 1904 was taken over by the Mid Kent Gas Light and Coke Company.

The River Bourne flows through the southern part of the parish. It once powered a paper mill at Basted.

=== Recent history ===
Piped water came from the Mid Kent Water Company in 1900. Kent Electric Power Company brought electricity in 1930.

During the Battle of Britain, Polish Air Force flying ace Ludwik Paszkiewicz was killed when his Hurricane fighter was shot down by a Luftwaffe Bf 109 on 27 September 1940. A memorial stone dedicated to Paszkiewicz was unveiled in 2018, at Crowhurst Farm in Borough Green, close to where he was shot down.

== Basted Mills Public Open Space ==
This area of 18.33 acres is a mile south from the centre of the town and is on the border of 4 parishes: Borough Green, Ightham, Platt and Plaxtol. It includes the old mill pond, two meadows and woodland with picnic areas and woodland walks. There is no parking area. The site of Basted Paper Mill, the mill records go back to 1438 when it was probably a water mill for grinding corn. Walter Monckton bought the mill in 1857, a grandfather of Viscount Monckton of Brenchley. The Monckton family lived in Kent since the Late 16th Century.

There has been a paper mill on the site for 200 years. Monckton rebuilt the mill in 1875. The mill was rebuilt following a fire in 1917 and worked on steam power until 1960, and closed after damage in floods in 1968.The mill supplied paper for postage stamps. A small housing area was built on the site at the end of the 20th Century.

== Governance ==
There are three tiers of local government covering Borough Green, at parish, district and county level: Borough Green Parish Council, Tonbridge and Malling Borough Council and Kent County Council. The parish council meets at the village hall on High Street.

Borough Green was historically part of the parish of Wrotham. In 1863 the parish was made a local government district, governed by a local board. Such districts were reconstituted as urban districts in 1894. Although named after Wrotham, the urban district council was always based in Borough Green, which was growing to become the largest settlement in the parish following the opening of the railway station in 1874. The council met at the Railway Hotel on Wrotham Road (now Sainsbury's) until 1902, then at a converted house it leased at 2 Sevenoaks Road from 1902 until 1924, before building its own headquarters at 16–18 Maidstone Road in 1924. Wrotham Urban District was abolished in 1934, with the area being absorbed into Malling Rural District and divided into the parishes of Borough Green (which also took some territory from Ightham), Platt, Plaxtol and Wrotham. Malling Rural District in turn was abolished in 1974 to become part of Tonbridge and Malling.

== Sports ==
Borough Green is home to the British Racing and Sports Car Club, one of the major organisers of motorsports events in the United Kingdom. The village's main football team is Potters Football Club of the Sevenoaks & District Premier Division, which fields one men's team. It has close ties with Borough Green Junior Football Club, which is also located in the village.

== Churches ==
Several denominations have places of worship in Borough Green:

- Anglican – Church of England: The Church of the Good Shepherd, Quarry Hill Road. Before 1875 Church of England members walked to Wrotham, Ightham, Platt or Plaxtol to go to Church. From that year services were held in the new Church of England Infants School. The foundation stone of the Church of the Good Shepherd was laid by Emmeline St. Tour, Countess Torrington on 9 January 1906 and consecrated by the Bishop of Rochester, Dr John Harmer on 5 July 1906. The Architects were Monckton and Gillespie.

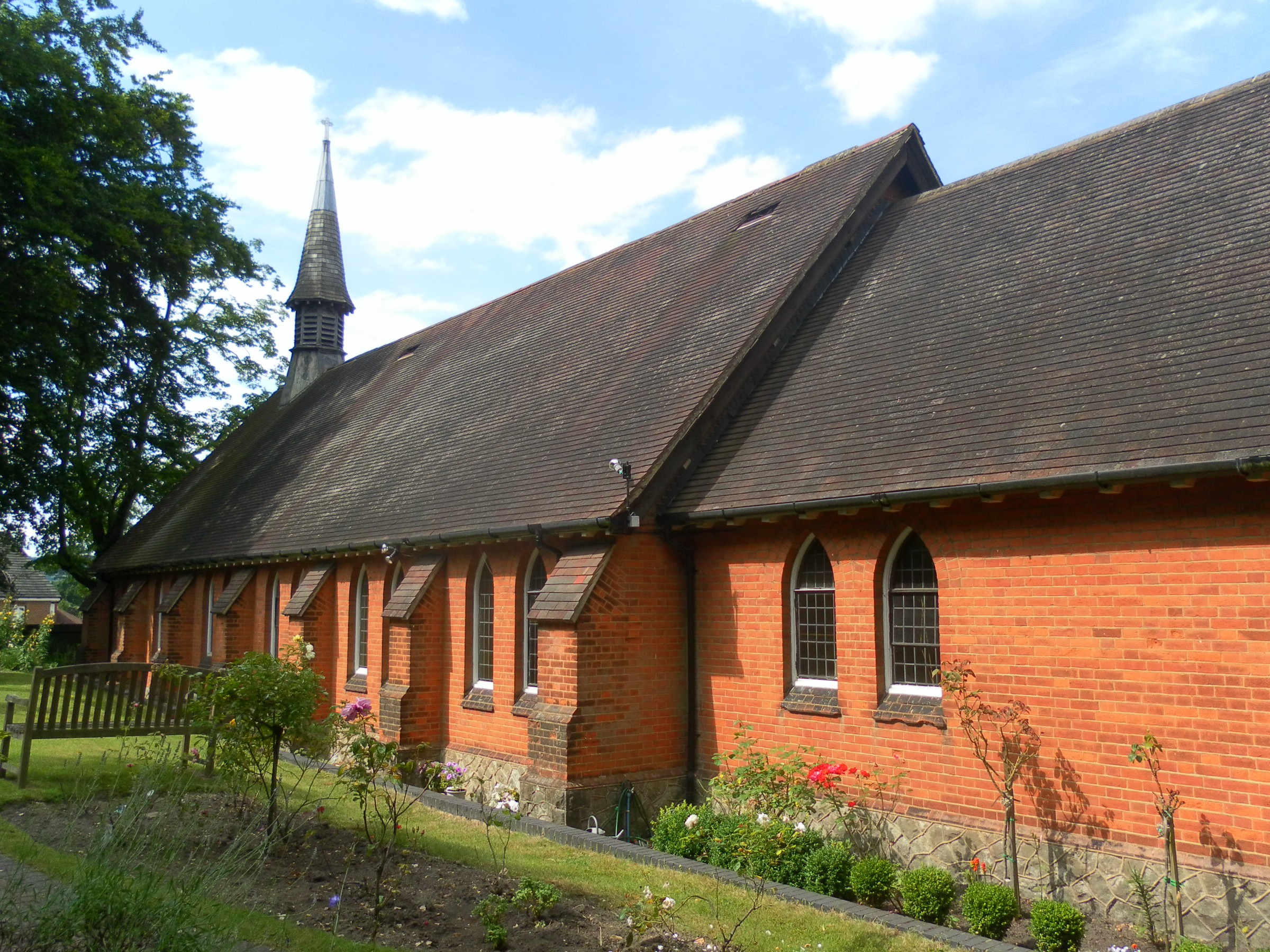
Church of the Good Shepherd, consecrated in 1906

Borough Green did not become a separate Church of England parish until 1973. Before that the village was divided into three church parishes. Most of the village was in Wrotham parish. The part in Ightham parish started at the junction of Rock road and the A25 and included everything West of Rock Road. After 1843 part of the village was in Platt parish and the Black Horse Inn marked the boundary.

- Baptist – Association of Grace Baptist Churches (South East): Borough Green Baptist Church, High Street. The land the chapel now stands on was purchased in 1816. Described as ‘wasteland’, it was sold as an outcome of the Enclosure Acts passed in 1814. It was purchased for twenty two pounds and ten shillings”. The chapel was opened for divine wor- ship in the spring of 1817.

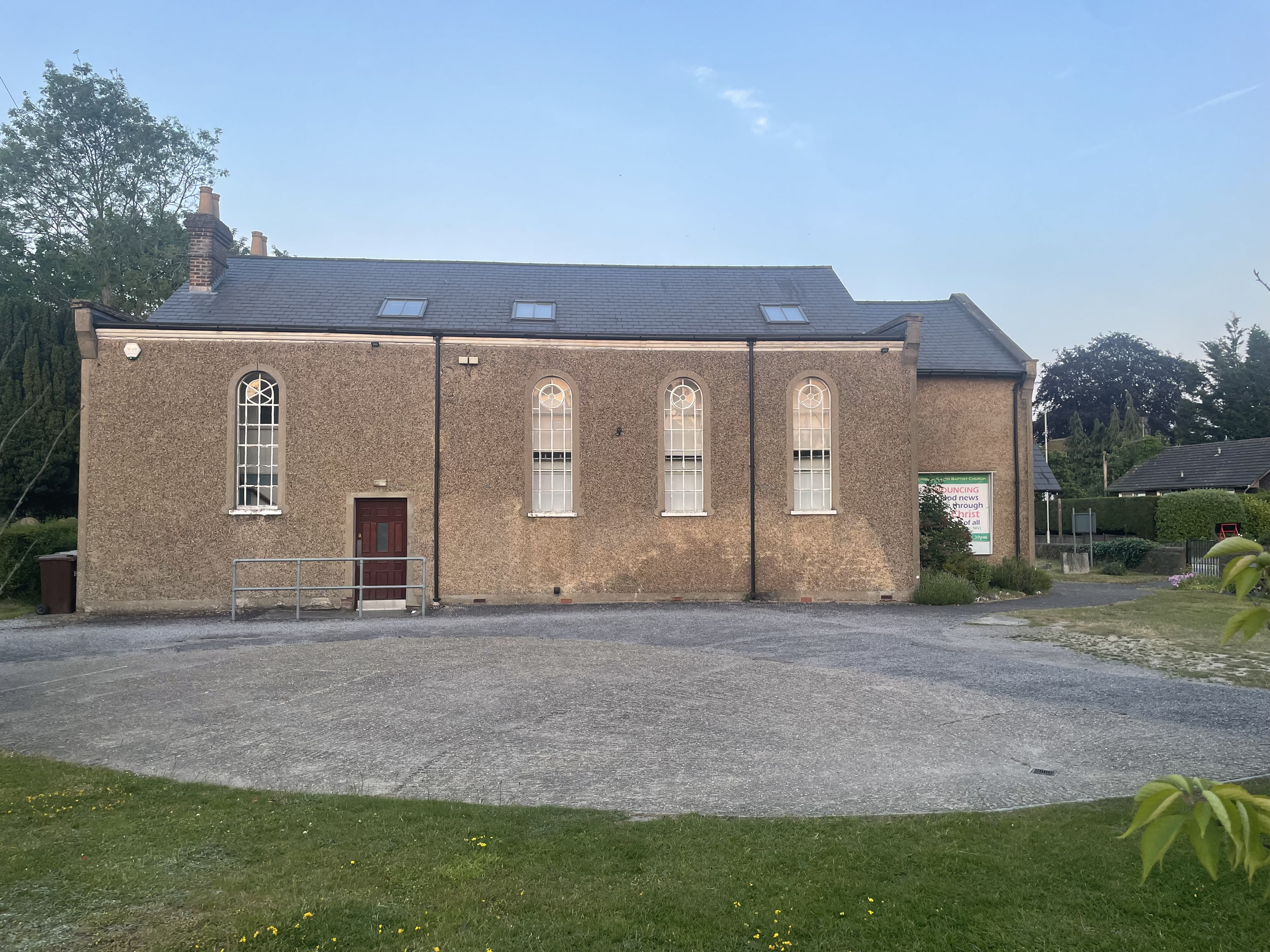
Borough Green Baptist Church

- Roman Catholic – St Joseph's, Western Road. The old village hall was built on this site in 1927. It was purchased by the diocese of Southwark in 1965. In 2017 a purpose-built church was officially opened on the site of the old building which had been demolished to make way for the new church.

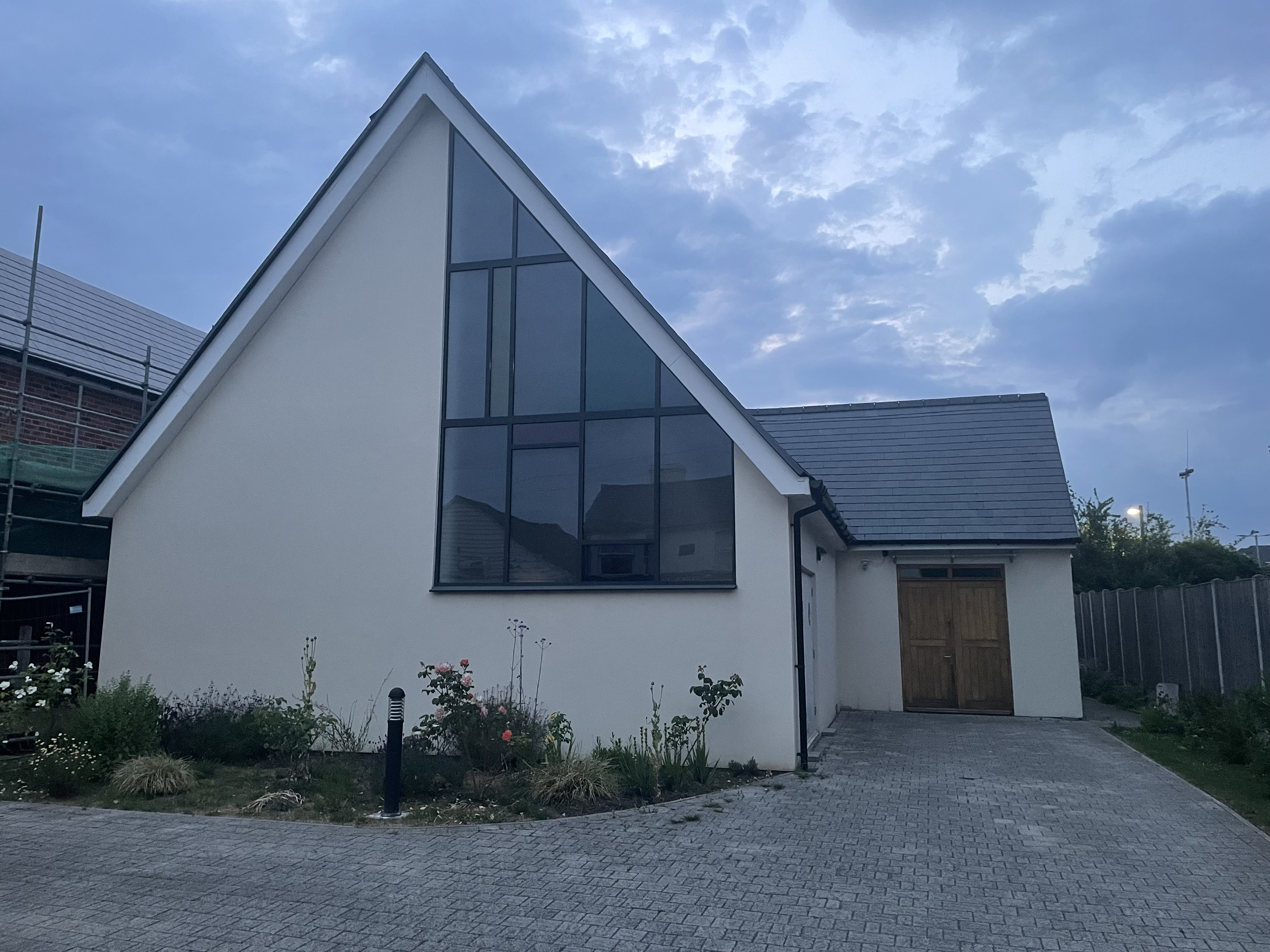
Catholic Church, opened in 2017, part of the Catholic parish of Sevenoaks

== Amenities ==
The village and nearby communities are served by Borough Green Primary School. The Medical Centre on Quarry Hill Road, opened in 1993 provides GP care. The first recorded practitioners in Borough Green were Dr AA Lipscomb and the Walker family.

The library was started in 1922 at the council school. it moved several times and finally to its purpose built building in 1977.

The Fire Brigade was founded in 1934. The modern Fire Station in Western Road was opened in 1964.

The Village Hall was built in 1964–65. It serves as a polling station during elections.

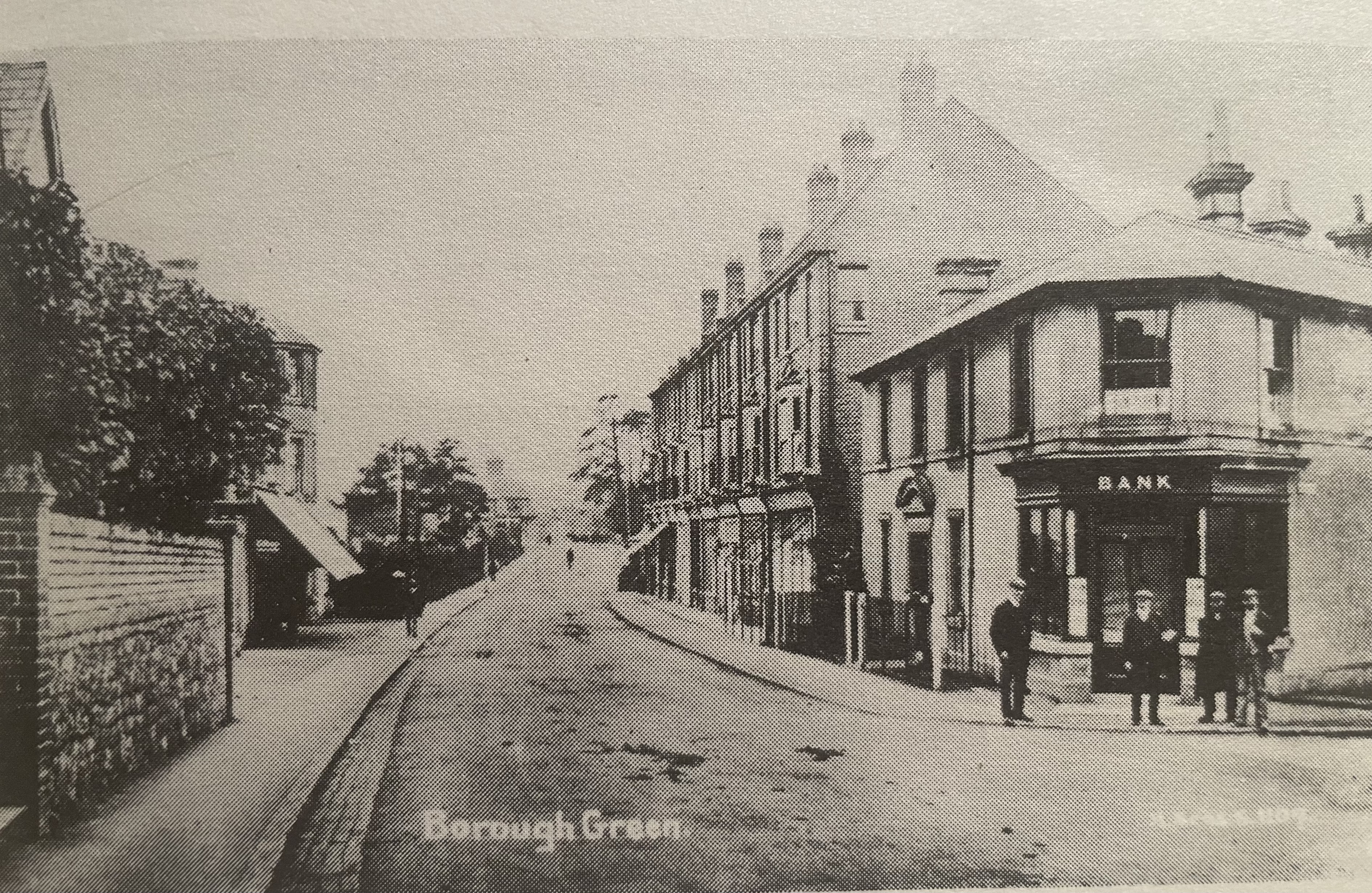
The ten small shops were built by a Mr Gregory between 1904 and 1908. A Bank opened on Fridays in 1904

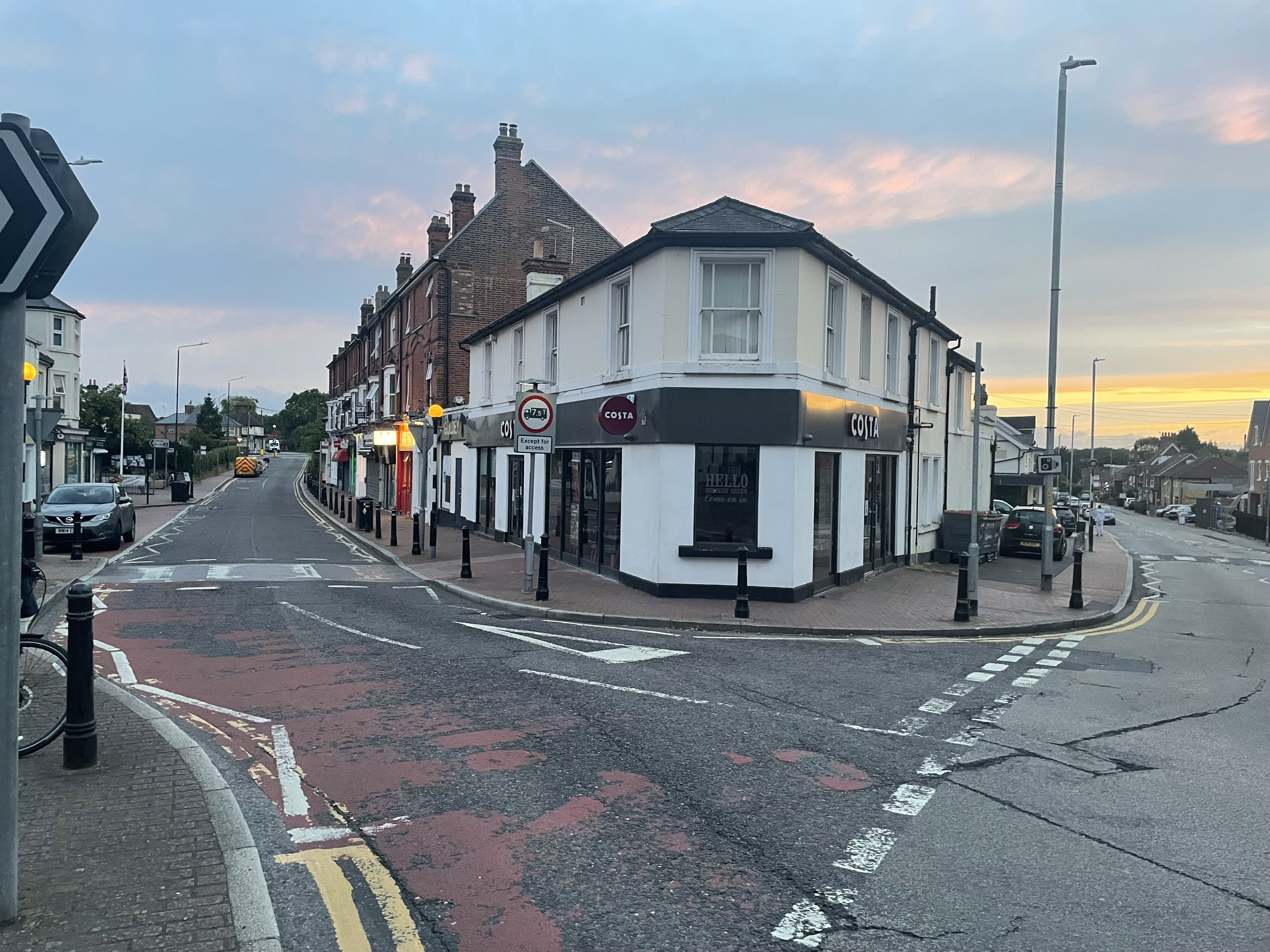
A similar view today. NatWest Bank closed in 2017 and is now Costa Coffee

Borough Green Post Office on the High Street is located in Nisa. There are several chain and independent retailers and teashops.

== Notable people ==
- Catherine Crowe (1803–1876), novelist and playwright, was born Catherine Ann Stevens in Borough Green.
- Richard Dixon (1930–2021), a chemist who worked on the thermal and optical properties of matter, was born in Borough Green.
- Richard Hearne (1908–1979), actor, comedian and writer, most famous as Mr Pastry a comical children's character, lived at Platt's Farm, Long Mill Lane in nearby St Mary Platt from the 1940s.
- Denton Welch (1915–1948), author and artist

== See also ==
- Listed buildings in Borough Green
