= Acheulean =

Archaeological culture associated with Homo erectus

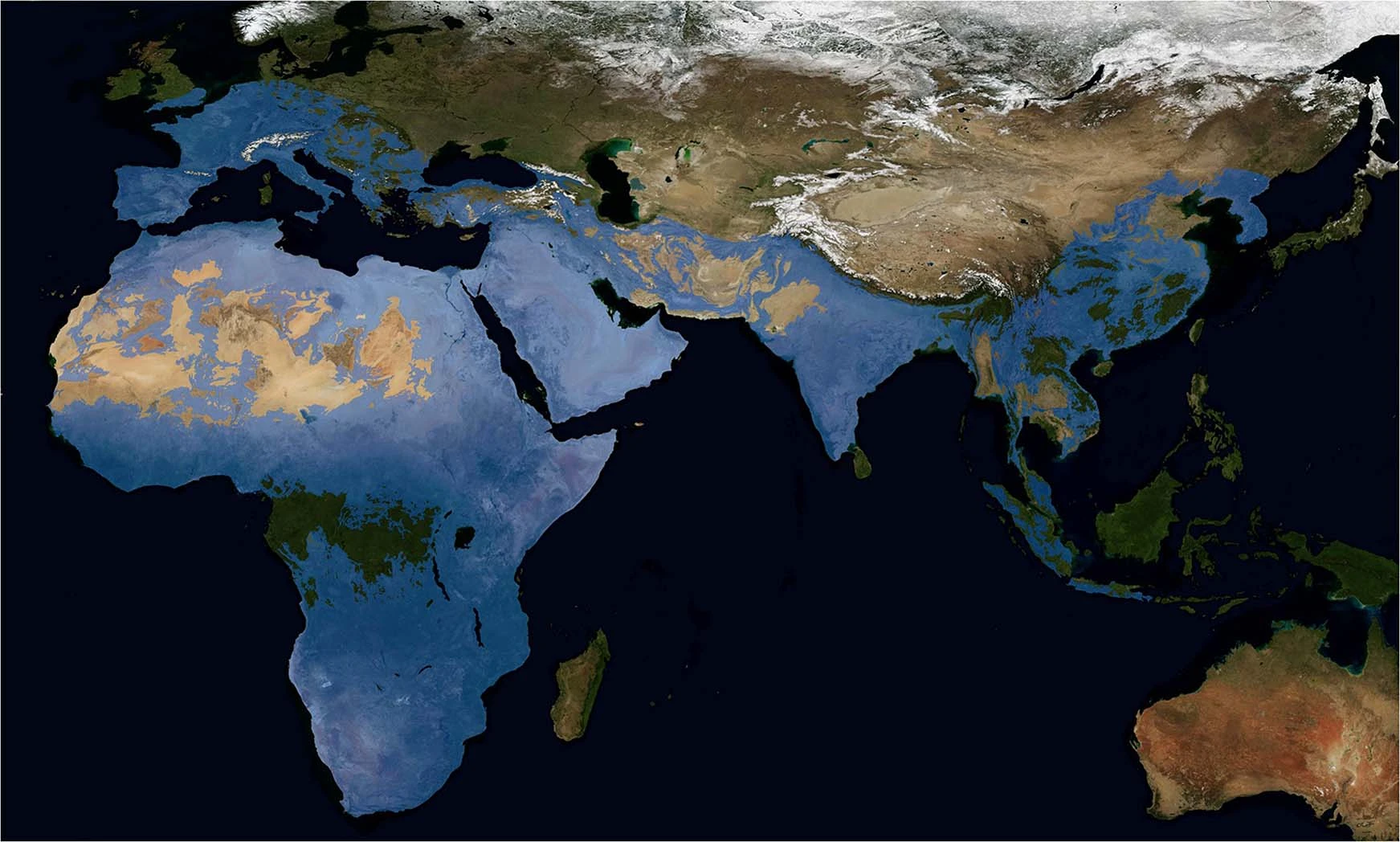
- Distribution of the Acheulean cultural tradition as it is currently understood, characterised by large bifacially flaked cutting tools (handaxes and cleavers)
- Geographical range: Africa, Europe, and Asia
- Period: Lower Paleolithic
- Dates: 1.95–0.13 Mya
- Type site: Saint-Acheul (Amiens)
- Preceded by: Oldowan
- Followed by: Mousterian, Clactonian, Micoquien, Aterian, Soanian, Sangoan, Acheulo-Yabrudian complex, Fauresmith industry

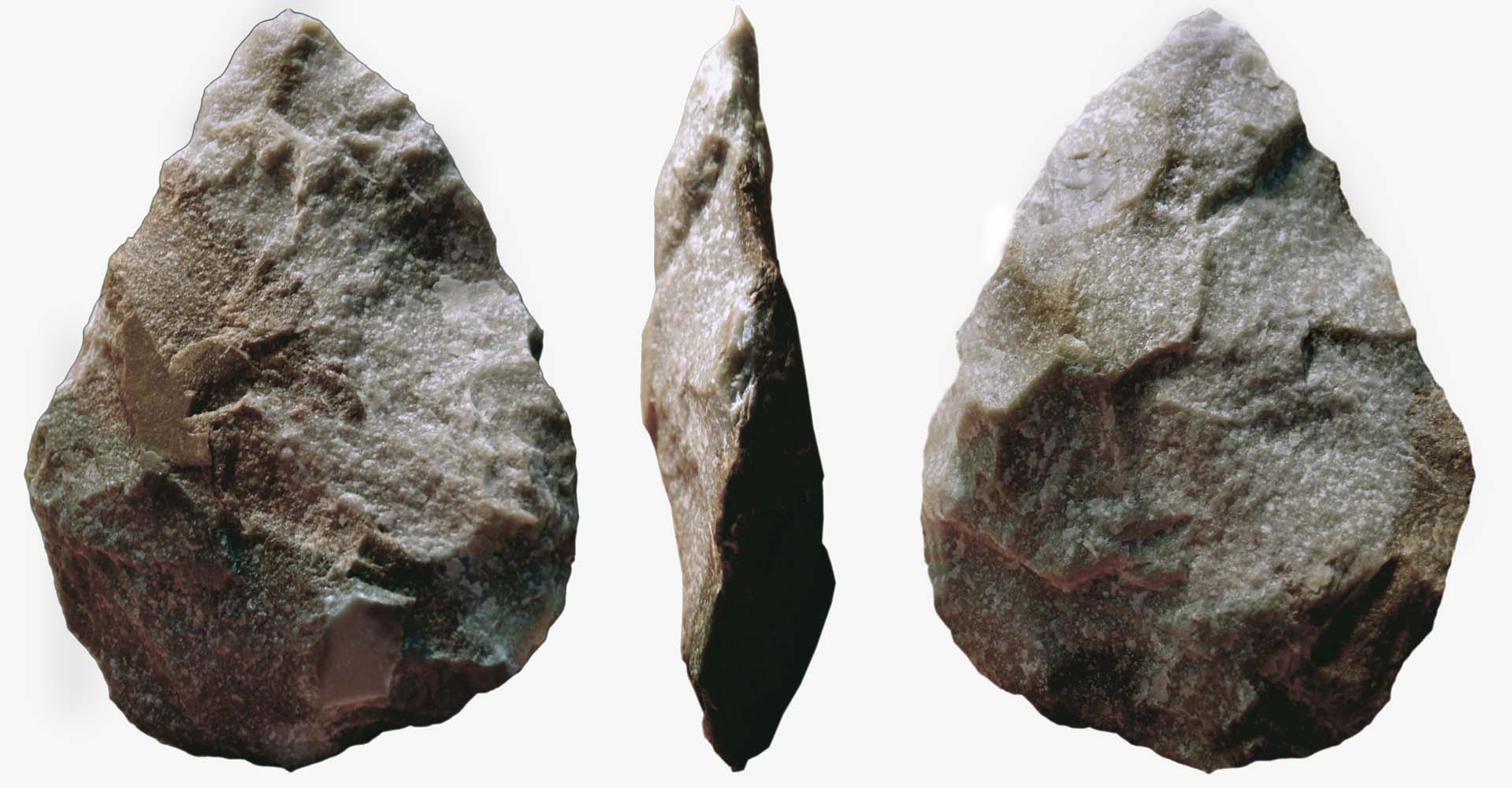
A cordiform biface as commonly found in the Acheulean (replica)

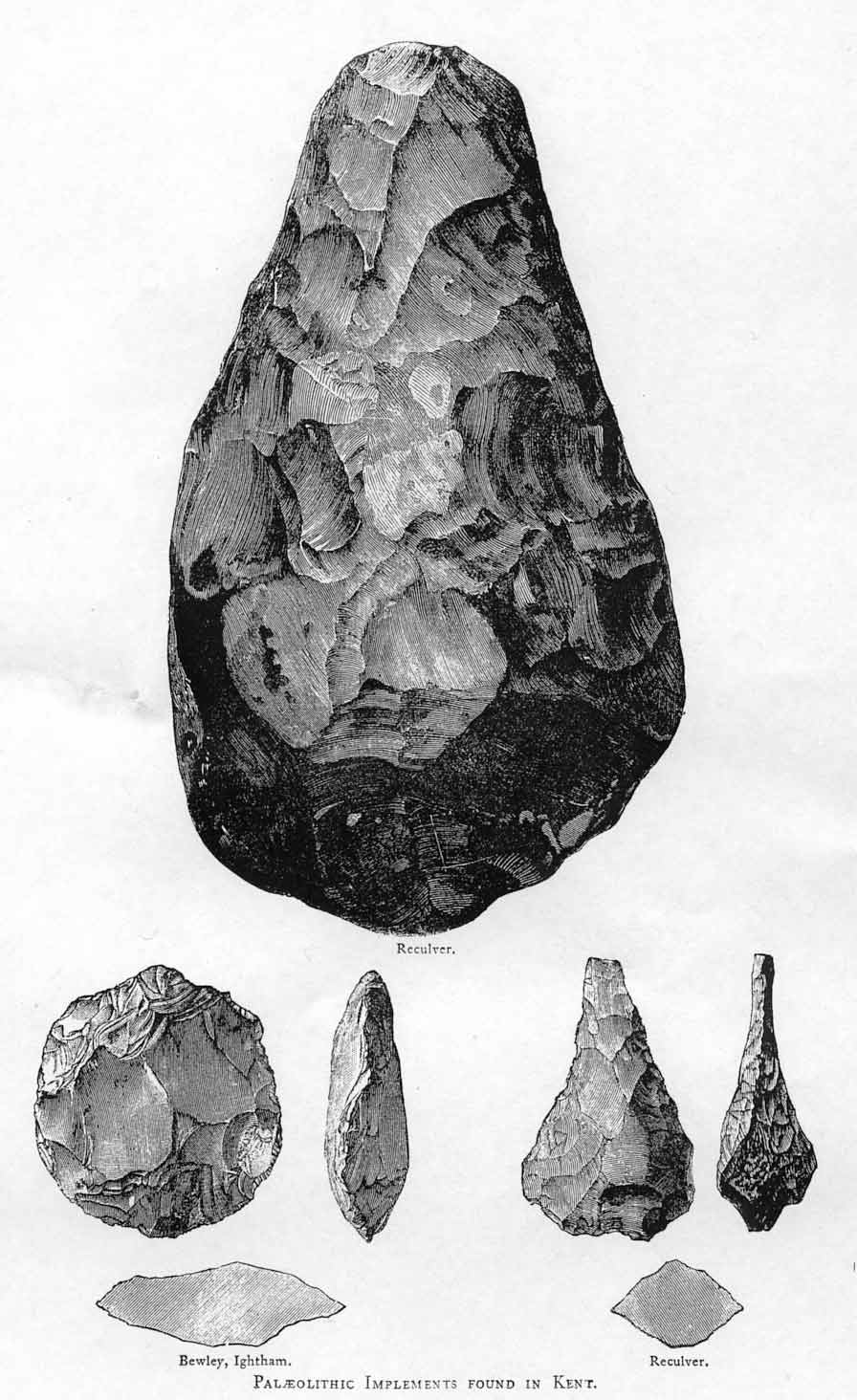
Acheulean hand-axes from Kent. The types shown are (clockwise from top) cordiform, ficron, and ovate.

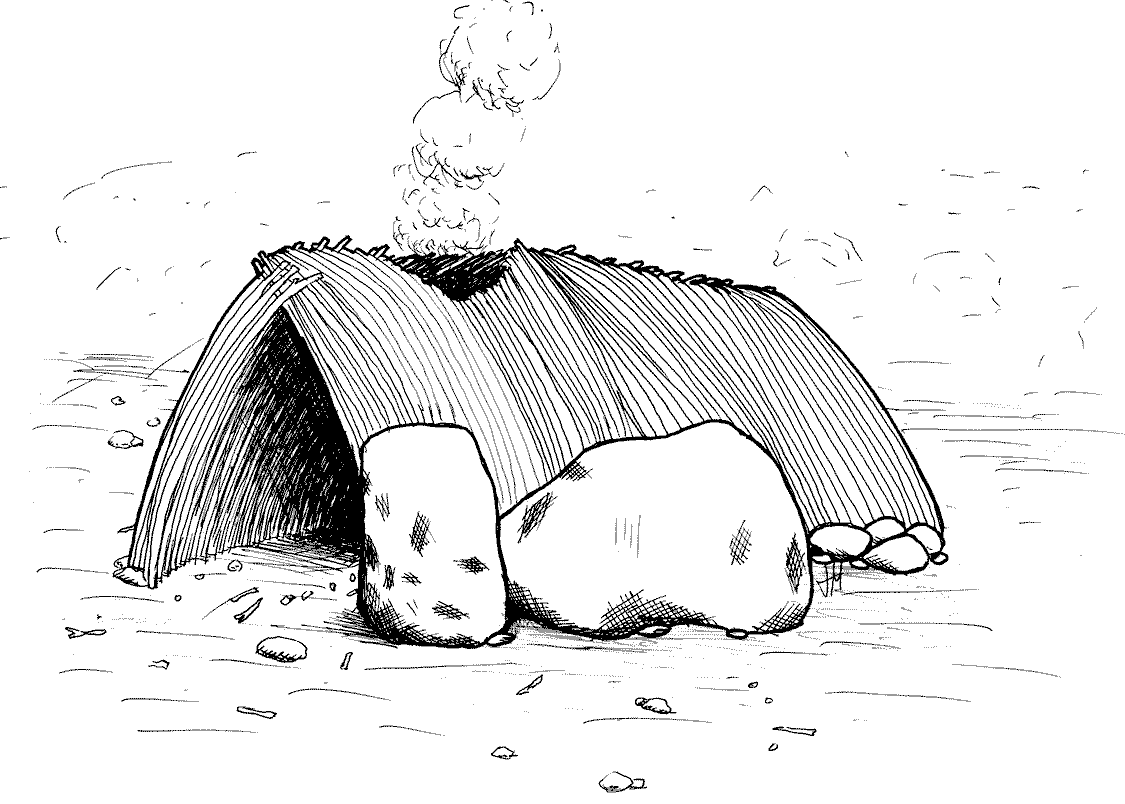
Depiction of a Terra Amata hut in Nice, France dated to 400 thousand years ago, as postulated by Henry de Lumley.

Acheulean (/əˈʃuːliən/; also Acheulian and Mode II), from the French acheuléen after the type site of Saint-Acheul, is an archaeological industry of stone tool manufacture characterized by the distinctive oval and pear-shaped "hand axes" associated with Homo erectus and derived species such as Homo heidelbergensis.

Acheulean tools were produced during the Lower Palaeolithic era across Africa and much of West Asia, South Asia, East Asia and Europe, and are typically found with Homo erectus remains. It is thought that Acheulean technologies first developed about 2 million years ago, derived from the more primitive Oldowan technology associated with Homo habilis. The Acheulean includes at least the early part of the Middle Paleolithic. Its end is not well defined; if Sangoan (also known as Epi-Acheulean) is included, it may be taken to last until as late as 130,000 years ago. In Europe and Western Asia, early Neanderthals utilized Acheulean technology, later transitioning to the more advanced Mousterian.

== History of research ==
The type site for the Acheulean is Saint-Acheul, a suburb of Amiens, the capital of the Somme department in Picardy, where artifacts were found in 1859.

John Frere is generally credited as being the first to suggest a very ancient date for Acheulean hand-axes. In 1797, he sent two examples to the Royal Academy in London from Hoxne in Suffolk. He had found them in prehistoric lake deposits along with the bones of extinct animals and concluded that they were made by people "who had not the use of metals" and that they belonged to a "very ancient period indeed, even beyond the present world". His ideas were, however, ignored by his contemporaries, who subscribed to a pre-Darwinian view of human evolution.

Later, Jacques Boucher de Crèvecœur de Perthes, working between 1836 and 1846, collected further examples of hand-axes and fossilised animal bone from the gravel river terraces of the Somme near Abbeville in northern France. Again, his theories attributing great antiquity to the finds were spurned by his colleagues, until one of de Perthes' main opponents, Marcel Jérôme Rigollot, began finding more tools near Saint Acheul. Following visits to both Abbeville and Saint Acheul by the geologist Joseph Prestwich, the age of the tools was finally accepted.

In 1872, Louis Laurent Gabriel de Mortillet described the characteristic hand-axe tools as belonging to L'Epoque de St Acheul. The industry was renamed as the Acheulean in 1925.

== Dating the Acheulean ==
Providing calendrical dates and ordered chronological sequences in the study of early stone tool manufacture is often accomplished through one or more geological techniques, such as radiometric dating, often potassium-argon dating, and magnetostratigraphy. From the Konso Formation of Ethiopia, Acheulean hand-axes are dated to about 1.5 million years ago using radiometric dating of deposits containing volcanic ashes. Acheulean tools in South Asia have also been found to be dated as far as 1.5 million years ago. However, in 2003 examples of the Acheulean from the West Turkana region of Kenya were described which have been dated through the method of magnetostratigraphy to about 1.76 million years ago, and in 2023 finds from Ethiopia were reported dating to 1.95 million years ago. The earliest user of Acheulean tools may have been Homo ergaster, who first appeared about 1.8 million years ago (not all researchers use this formal name, and instead prefer to call these users early Homo erectus). However, it is impossible to know for sure whether Homo ergaster was the only maker of early Acheulean tools, since other hominin species, such as Homo habilis, also lived in East Africa at this time.

From geological dating of sedimentary deposits, it appears that the Acheulean originated in Africa and spread to Asian, Middle Eastern, and European areas sometime between 1.5 million years ago and about 800 thousand years ago. In individual regions, this dating can be considerably refined; in Europe for example, it was thought that Acheulean methods did not reach the continent until around 500,000 years ago. However, more recent research demonstrated that hand-axes from Spain were made more than 900,000 years ago.

Relative dating techniques (based on a presumption that technology progresses over time) suggest that Acheulean tools followed on from earlier, cruder tool-making methods, but there is considerable chronological overlap in early prehistoric stone-working industries, with evidence in some regions that Acheulean tool-using groups were contemporary with other, less sophisticated industries such as the Clactonian and then later with the more sophisticated Mousterian, as well. It is therefore important not to see the Acheulean as a neatly defined period or one that happened as part of a clear sequence but as one tool-making technique that flourished especially well in early prehistory. The enormous geographic spread of Acheulean techniques also makes the name unwieldy as it represents numerous regional variations on a similar theme. The term Acheulean does not represent a common culture in the modern sense, rather it is a basic method for making stone tools that was shared across much of the Old World.

In Europe, the more advanced Mousterian utilizing the Levallois technique appeared around 320,000 years ago, and had displaced the Acheulean in Europe and the Middle East by around 125,000 years ago. The Acheulean had also disappeared from Africa by this time. The Acheulean may have lasted much later, until around 50,000 years ago in East Asia.

== Acheulean stone tools ==
=== Stages ===
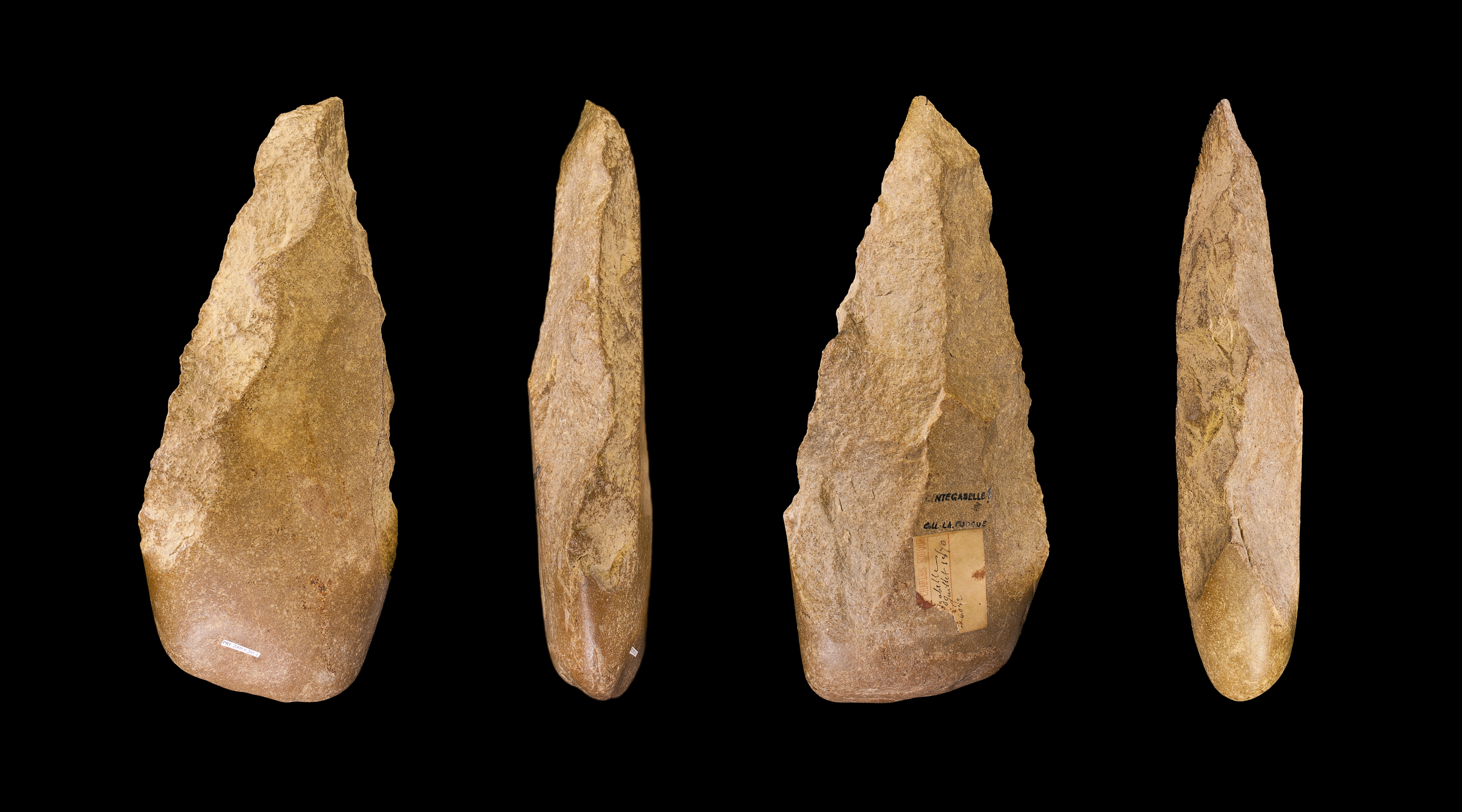
An Acheulean handaxe, Haute-Garonne France – MHNT

In the four divisions of prehistoric stone-working, Acheulean artefacts are classified as Mode 2, meaning they are more advanced than the (usually earlier) Mode 1 tools of the Clactonian or Oldowan/Abbevillian industries but lacking the sophistication of the (usually later) Mode 3 Middle Palaeolithic technology, exemplified by the Mousterian industry.

The Mode 1 industries created rough flake tools by hitting a suitable stone with a hammerstone. The resulting flake that broke off would have a natural sharp edge for cutting and could afterwards be sharpened further by striking another smaller flake from the edge if necessary (known as "retouch"). These early toolmakers may also have worked the stone they took the flake from (known as a core) to create chopper cores although there is some debate over whether these items were tools or just discarded cores.

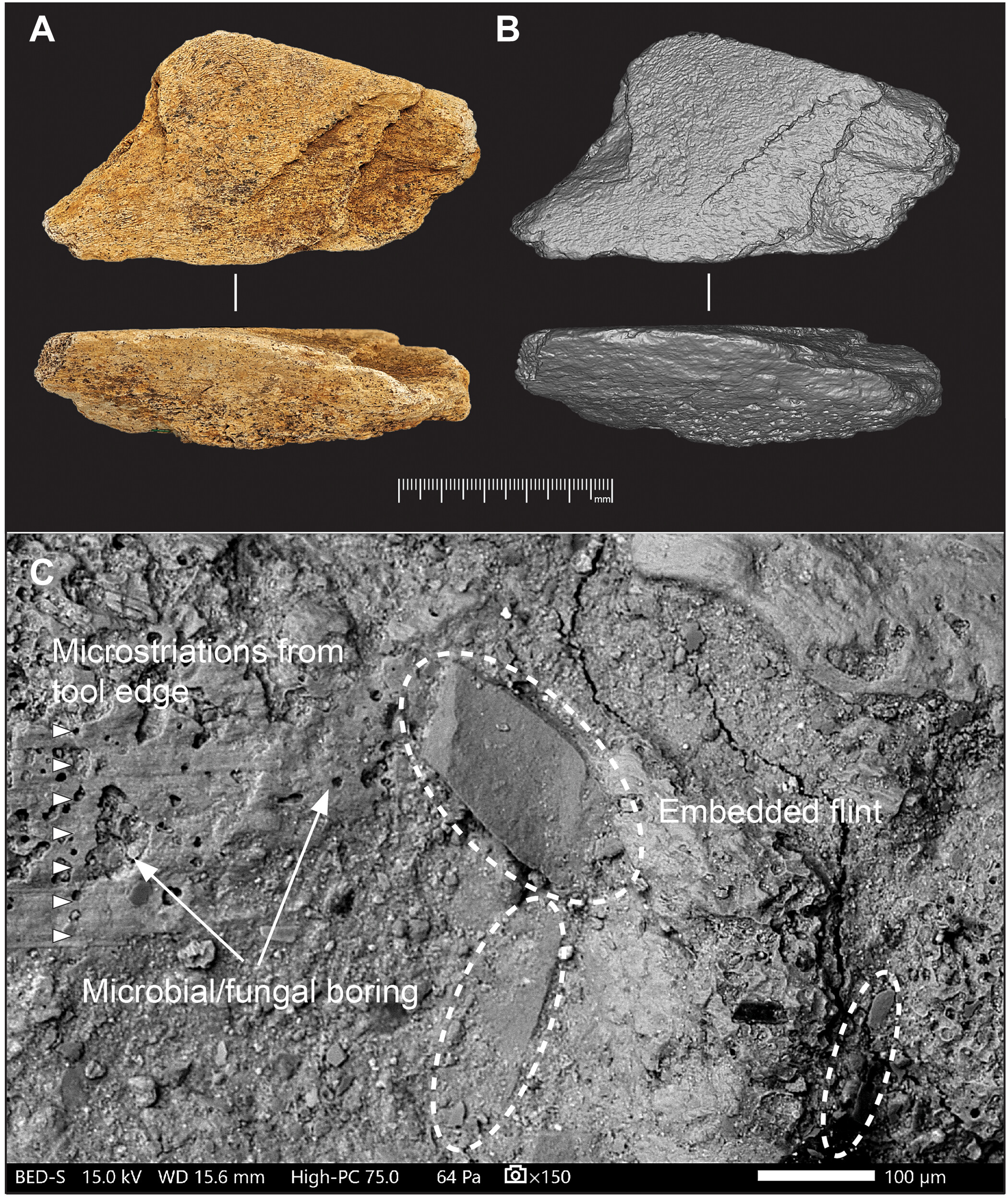
Soft hammer found at the Acheulean Boxgrove site, England made of the outer cortex of an elephant limb bone, with scanning electron microscope image showing flint chips embedded in the bone (bottom) as a result of its use

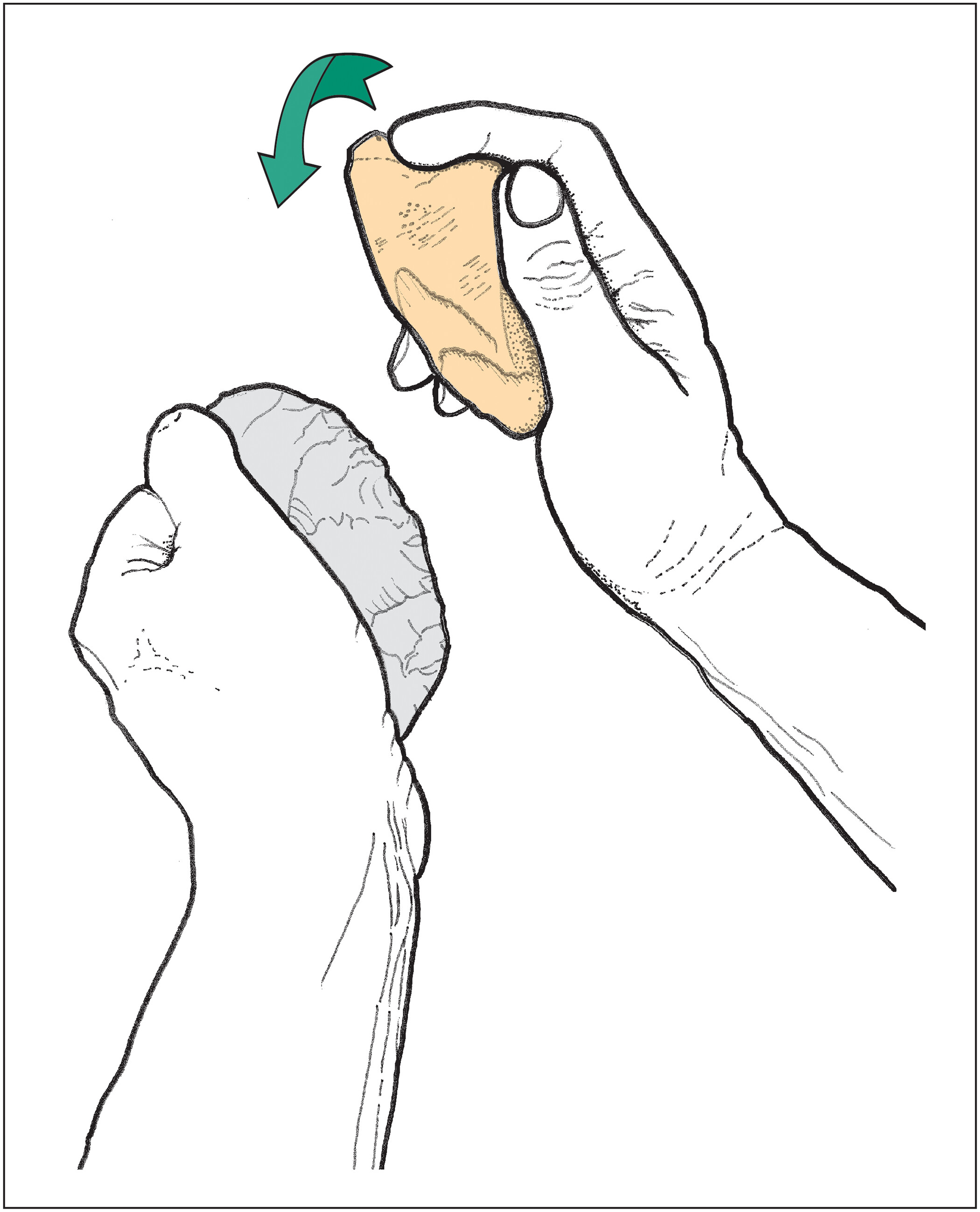
Proposed usage of the Boxgrove elephant bone soft hammer (yellow) to sharpen stone handaxes

Advanced, later Acheulean toolmakers supplemented stone-on-stone percussion by utilizing "soft hammer" percussion using bone, antler, or wood tools. These types of hammers, compared to stone, yields more control over the shape of the finished tool, and can be used to resharpen blunted tools. The oldest locality showing evidence of "soft hammer" percussion in Eurasia is the Boxgrove site in southern England, dating to around 480,000 years ago. Soft hammer percussion may have emerged around the same time in Africa. Unlike the earlier Mode 1 industries, it was the core that was prized over the flakes that came from it. Another advance was that the Mode 2 tools were worked symmetrically and on both sides indicating greater care in the production of the final tool.

Mode 3 technology emerged towards the end of Acheulean dominance and involved the Levallois technique, most famously exploited by the Mousterian industry. Transitional tool forms between the two are called Mousterian of Acheulean Tradition, or MTA types. The long blades of the Upper Palaeolithic Mode 4 industries appeared long after the Acheulean was abandoned.

As the period of Acheulean tool use is so vast, efforts have been made to classify various stages of it such as John Wymer's division into Early Acheulean, Middle Acheulean, Late Middle Acheulean and Late Acheulean for material from Britain. These schemes are normally regional and their dating and interpretations vary.

In Africa, there is a distinct difference in the tools made before and after 600,000 years ago with the older group being thicker and less symmetric and the younger being more extensively trimmed.

=== Manufacture ===
The primary innovation associated with Acheulean hand-axes is that the stone was worked symmetrically and on both sides. For the latter reason, handaxes are, along with cleavers, bifacially worked tools that could be manufactured from the large flakes themselves or from prepared cores.

Tool types found in Acheulean assemblages include pointed, cordate, ovate, ficron, and bout-coupé hand-axes (referring to the shapes of the final tool), cleavers, retouched flakes, scrapers, and segmental chopping tools. Materials used were determined by available local stone types; flint is most often associated with the tools but its use is concentrated in Western Europe; in Africa sedimentary and igneous rock such as mudstone and basalt were most widely used, for example. Other source materials include chalcedony, quartzite, andesite, sandstone, chert, and shale. Even relatively soft rock such as limestone could be exploited. In all cases the toolmakers worked their handaxes close to the source of their raw materials, suggesting that the Acheulean was a set of skills passed between individual groups.

Some smaller tools were made from large flakes that had been struck from stone cores. These flake tools and the distinctive waste flakes produced in Acheulean tool manufacture suggest a more considered technique, one that required the toolmaker to think one or two steps ahead during work that necessitated a clear sequence of steps to create perhaps several tools in one sitting.

A hard hammerstone would first be used to rough out the shape of the tool from the stone by removing large flakes. These large flakes might be re-used to create tools. The tool maker would work around the circumference of the remaining stone core, removing smaller flakes alternately from each face. The scar created by the removal of the preceding flake would provide a striking platform for the removal of the next. Misjudged blows or flaws in the material used could cause problems, but a skilled toolmaker could overcome them.

Once the roughout shape was created, a further phase of flaking was undertaken to make the tool thinner. The thinning flakes were removed using a softer hammer, such as bone or antler. The softer hammer required more careful preparation of the striking platform and this would be abraded using a coarse stone to ensure the hammer did not slide off when struck.

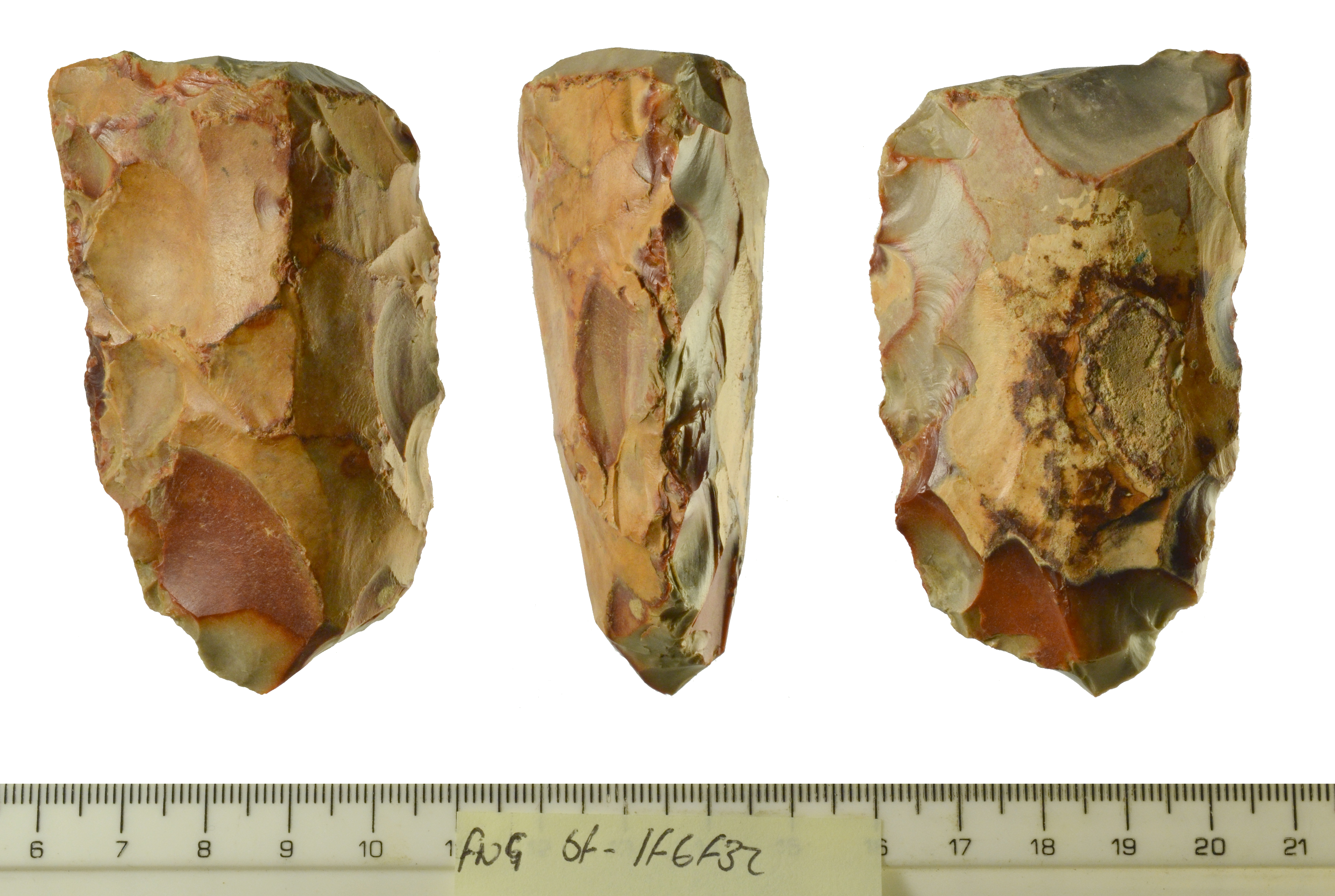
A tranchet axe

Final shaping was then applied to the usable cutting edge of the tool, again using fine removal of flakes. Some Acheulean tools were sharpened instead by the removal of a tranchet flake. This was struck from the lateral edge of the hand-axe close to the intended cutting area, resulting in the removal of a flake running along (parallel to) the blade of the axe to create a neat and very sharp working edge. This distinctive tranchet flake can be identified amongst flint-knapping debris at Acheulean sites.

=== Use ===
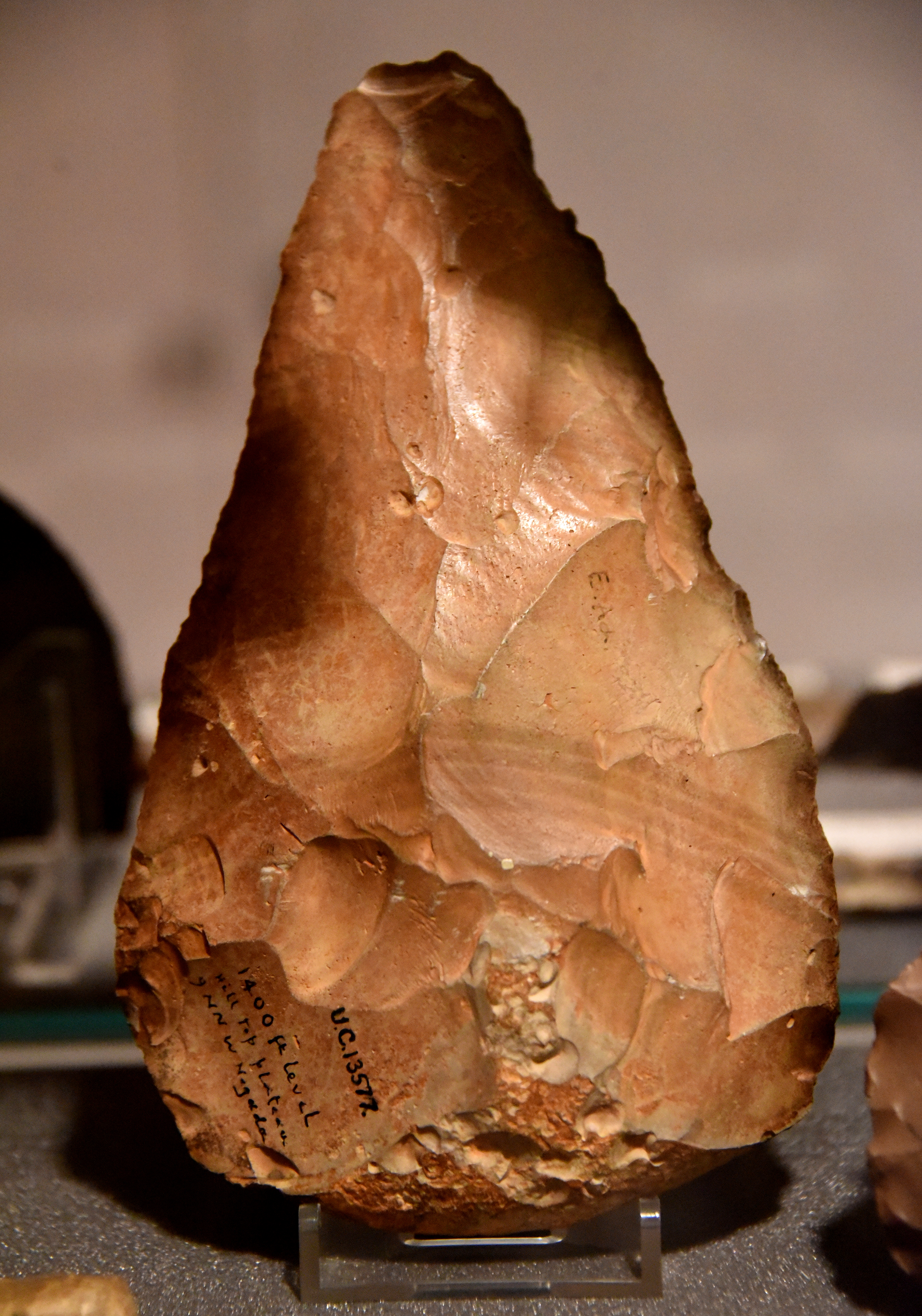
Acheulean hand-axe, found on a hilltop at 1400 feet altitude, nine miles northwest of Naqada, Egypt, displayed in the Petrie Museum of Egyptian Archaeology

Loren Eiseley calculated that Acheulean tools have an average useful cutting edge of 20 centimetres (8 inches), making them much more efficient than the 5 centimetres (2 inches) average of Oldowan tools.

A wear analysis of handaxes from the 480,000 year old late Acheulean Boxgrove site in England found that they were primarily if not exclusively used for animal butchery, with no evidence for their use in woodworking or digging.

Alternative theories include a use for ovate hand-axes as a kind of hunting discus to be hurled at prey. Puzzlingly, there are also examples of sites where hundreds of hand-axes, many impractically large and also apparently unused, have been found in close association together. Sites such as Melka Kunturé in Ethiopia, Olorgesailie in Kenya, Isimila in Tanzania, and Kalambo Falls in Zambia have produced evidence that suggests Acheulean hand-axes might not always have had a functional purpose.

Recently, it has been suggested that the Acheulean tool users adopted the handaxe as a social artifact, meaning that it embodied something beyond its function of a butchery or wood cutting tool. Knowing how to create and use these tools would have been a valuable skill and the more elaborate ones suggest that they played a role in their owners' identity and their interactions with others. This would help explain the apparent over-sophistication of some examples which may represent a "historically accrued social significance".

One theory goes further and suggests that some special hand-axes were made and displayed by males in search of a mate, using a large, well-made hand-axe to demonstrate that they possessed sufficient strength and skill to pass on to their offspring. Once they had attracted a female at a group gathering, it is suggested that they would discard their axes, perhaps explaining why so many are found together. This popular sexual selection hypothesis is controversial due to the assumptions made about sexual selection among extinct organisms.

Stone knapping with limited digital dexterity makes the center of mass the required direction of flake removal. Physics then dictates a circular or oval end pattern, similar to the handaxe, for a leftover core after flake production. This would explain the abundance, wide distribution, proximity to source, consistent shape, and lack of actual use, of these artifacts.

Mimi Lam, a researcher from the University of British Columbia, has suggested that Acheulean hand-axes became "the first commodity: A marketable good or service that has value and is used as an item for exchange."

=== Distribution ===
Map of Afro-Eurasia showing important sites of the Acheulean industry (clickable map).

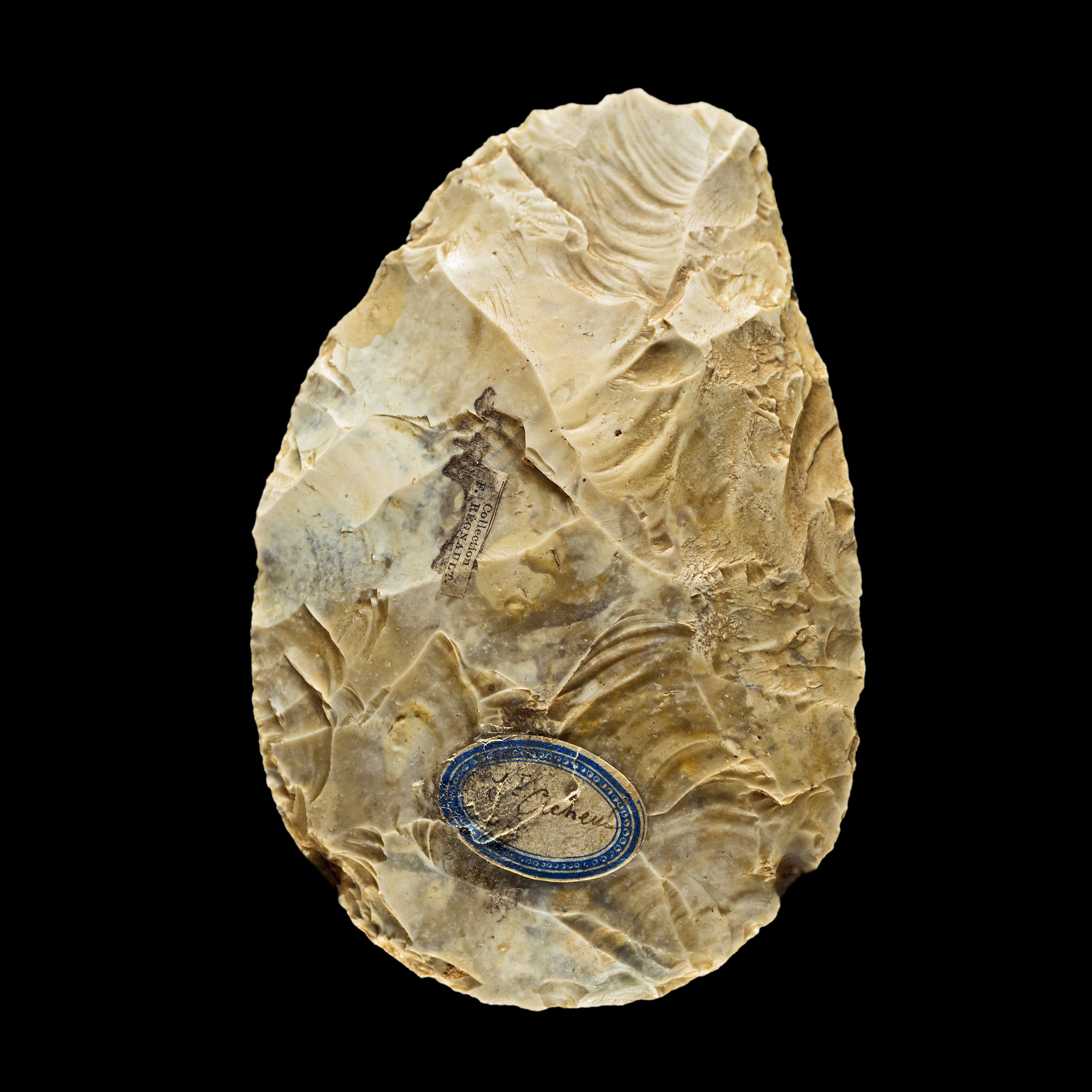
Acheulean Biface from Saint Acheul

The geographic distribution of Acheulean tools – and thus the peoples who made them – is often interpreted as being the result of palaeo-climatic and ecological factors, such as glaciation and the desertification of the Sahara Desert.

Acheulean stone tools have been found across the continent of Africa, save for the dense rainforest around the Congo River which is not thought to have been colonized by hominids until later. It is thought that from Africa their use spread north and east to Asia: from Anatolia, through the Arabian Peninsula, across modern day Iran and Pakistan, and into India, and beyond. In Europe their users reached the Pannonian Basin and the western Mediterranean regions, modern day France, the Low Countries, western Germany, and southern and central Britain.

Areas further north did not see human occupation until much later, due to glaciation. In Athirampakkam at Chennai in Tamil Nadu the Acheulean age started at 1.51 mya and it is also prior than North India and Europe.

Until the 1980s, it was thought that the humans who arrived in East Asia abandoned the hand-axe technology of their ancestors and adopted chopper tools instead. An apparent division between Acheulean and non-Acheulean tool industries was identified by Hallam L. Movius, who drew the Movius Line across northern India to show where the traditions seemed to diverge. Later finds of Acheulean tools at Chongokni in South Korea and also in Mongolia and China, however, cast doubt on the reliability of Movius's distinction. Since then, a different division known as the Roe Line has been suggested. This runs across North Africa to Israel and thence to India, separating two different techniques used by Acheulean toolmakers. North and east of the Roe Line, Acheulean hand-axes were made directly from large stone nodules and cores; while, to the south and west, they were made from flakes struck from these nodules.

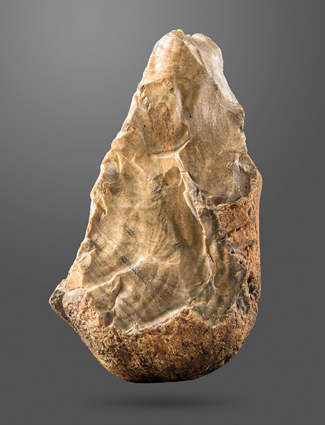
Biface (trihedral) from Amar Merdeg, Mehran, displayed in National Museum of Iran

== Acheulean tool users ==
Most notably, however, it is Homo ergaster (sometimes called early Homo erectus), whose assemblages are almost exclusively Acheulean, who used the technique. Later, the related species Homo heidelbergensis (the common ancestor of both Neanderthals and Homo sapiens) used it extensively. Late Acheulean tools were still used by species derived from H. erectus, including Homo sapiens idaltu and early Neanderthals.

The symmetry of the hand-axes has been used to suggest that Acheulean tool users possessed the ability to use language; the parts of the brain connected with fine control and movement are located in the same region that controls speech. The wider variety of tool types compared to earlier industries and their aesthetically as well as functionally pleasing form could indicate a higher intellectual level in Acheulean tool users than in earlier hominines. Others argue that there is no correlation between spatial abilities in tool making and linguistic behaviour, and that language is not learned or conceived in the same manner as artefact manufacture.

Lower Palaeolithic finds made in association with Acheulean hand-axes, such as the Venus of Berekhat Ram, have been used to argue for artistic expression amongst the tool users. The incised elephant tibia from Bilzingsleben in Germany, and ochre finds from Kapthurin in Kenya and Duinefontein in South Africa, are sometimes cited as being some of the earliest examples of an aesthetic sensibility in human history. There are numerous other explanations put forward for the creation of these artefacts; however, evidence of human art did not become commonplace until around 50,000 years ago, after the emergence of modern Homo sapiens.

The kill site at Boxgrove in England is another famous Acheulean site. Up until the 1970s these kill sites, often at waterholes where animals would gather to drink, were interpreted as being where Acheulean tool users killed game, butchered their carcasses, and then discarded the tools they had used. Since the advent of zooarchaeology, which has placed greater emphasis on studying animal bones from archaeological sites, this view has changed. Many of the animals at these kill sites have been found to have been killed by other predator animals, so it is likely that humans of the period supplemented hunting with scavenging from already dead animals.

Excavations at the Bnot Ya'akov Bridge site, located along the Dead Sea rift in the southern Hula Valley of northern Israel, have revealed evidence of human habitation in the area from as early as 750,000 years ago. Archaeologists from the Hebrew University of Jerusalem claim that the site provides evidence of "advanced human behavior" half a million years earlier than has previously been estimated. Their report describes an Acheulean layer at the site in which numerous stone tools, animal bones, and plant remains have been found.

Azykh cave located in Azerbaijan is another site where Acheulean tools were found. In 1968, a lower jaw of a new type of hominid was discovered in the fifth layer (so-called Acheulean layer) of the cave. Specialists named this type "Azykhantropus".

Only limited artefactual evidence survives of the users of Acheulean tools other than the stone tools themselves. Cave sites were exploited for habitation, but the hunter-gatherers of the Palaeolithic also possibly built shelters such as those identified in connection with Acheulean tools at Grotte du Lazaret and Terra Amata near Nice in France. The presence of the shelters is inferred from large rocks at the sites, which may have been used to weigh down the bottoms of tent-like structures or serve as foundations for huts or windbreaks. These stones may have been naturally deposited. In any case, a flimsy wood or animal skin structure would leave few archaeological traces after so much time. Fire was seemingly being exploited by Homo ergaster, and would have been a necessity in colonising colder Eurasia from Africa. Conclusive evidence of mastery over it this early is, however, difficult to find.

== See also ==
- Hand axe
- Lithic reduction
- Lower Palaeolithic
- Ndutu cranium
- Oldowan
- Palaeolithic
- Stone Age
- Stone tools
