= Listed buildings in Borough Green =

Civil Parish in Kent, England

Borough Green is a village and civil parish in the Tonbridge and Malling district of Kent, England. It contains 12 listed buildings that are recorded in the National Heritage List for England. Of these all 12 are grade II.

This list is based on the information retrieved online from Historic England.

== Key ==
Grade	Criteria
I	Buildings that are of exceptional interest
II*	Particularly important buildings of more than special interest
II	Buildings that are of special interest

== Listing ==
Name	Grade	Location	Type	Completed (Note: The date given is the date used by Historic England as significant for the initial building or that of an important part in the structure's description.)	Date designated	Grid ref. (Note: The grid reference is based on the British national grid reference system, sometimes known as OSGB36, used by the Ordnance Survey.) Geo-coordinates	Notes	Entry number (Note: The "List Entry Number" is a unique number assigned to each listed building and scheduled monument by Historic England.)	Image	Wikidata
Two Barns with Attached Outbuildings at Borough Green House	II				6 June 2000	TQ6069857126; 51°17′26″N 0°18′12″E		1380377	Upload Photo	Q26660580
Fourways House	II	Maidstone Road			30 May 1984	TQ6085257174; 51°17′28″N 0°18′20″E		1235934	Upload Photo	Q26529214
Hunts Farmhouse	II	77, Maidstone Road			30 May 1984	TQ6119457152; 51°17′26″N 0°18′37″E		1235930	Upload Photo	Q26529210
Knole Cottage	II	7, Quarry Hill Road			1 September 2006	TQ6079857169; 51°17′27″N 0°18′17″E		1391748	Upload Photo	Q26671100
Number 3 Including the Former Apple Store	II	3, Rock Road			6 June 2000	TQ6069557149; 51°17′27″N 0°18′12″E		1380379	Upload Photo	Q26660582
Forge Cottage	II	91 Station Road, Sevenoaks, TN15 8EX			10 August 2015	TQ6100157247; 51°17′30″N 0°18′28″E		1427793	Upload Photo	Q26677386
35-39, Sevenoaks Road	II	35-39, Sevenoaks Road			31 March 1981	TQ6062157296; 51°17′32″N 0°18′08″E		1264831	Upload Photo	Q26555487
Fourways House	II	Sevenoaks Road			30 May 1984	TQ6078957257; 51°17′30″N 0°18′17″E		1235935	Upload Photo	Q26680477
Red Lion Public House	II	Sevenoaks Road			30 May 1984	TQ6060057312; 51°17′32″N 0°18′07″E		1264830	Upload Photo	Q26555486
89, Station Road	II	89, Station Road			30 May 1984	TQ6099557248; 51°17′30″N 0°18′27″E		1235960	Upload Photo	Q26529236
Oak Cottage Oakley Cottage Tudor Cottage	II	53-59, Wrotham Road			30 May 1984	TQ6103357736; 51°17′46″N 0°18′30″E		1264820	Upload Photo	Q26555477
The Old Manor House	II	Wrotham Road			1 August 1952	TQ6105057548; 51°17′39″N 0°18′31″E		1235988	Upload Photo	Q26529262

== See also ==
- Grade I listed buildings in Kent
- Grade II* listed buildings in Kent

== Sources ==
- Newman, John (2012) [1969], Kent: West and the Weald, The Buildings of England, New Haven and London: Yale University Press, ISBN 978-0-300-18509-6
