= Catherine Crowe =

English writer for adults and children

- Born: Catherine Ann Stevens; 20 September 1803; Borough Green, Kent, England
- Died: 14 June 1876 (aged 72); Folkestone, Kent
- Occupation: Writer
- Spouse: John Crowe
- Children: 1
- Writing career
- Genres: Novels, plays, spirit stories

Catherine Ann Crowe (née Stevens; 20 September 1790 – 14 June 1872) was an English novelist, a writer of social and supernatural stories, and a playwright. She also wrote for children.

== Life ==
Catherine Ann Stevens was born in Borough Green, Kent, England. She was educated at home, spending most of her childhood in Kent.

She married an army officer, Major John Crowe (1783–1872) and had a son, John William Crowe (1824–1901), but the marriage was an unhappy one, and when she met Sydney Smith and his family at Clifton, Bristol in 1828, she asked them for their help. Little is known about the next few years, but by 1838 she was separated from her husband, living in Edinburgh, and had made the acquaintance of several writers, including the impecunious Thomas de Quincey of Edinburgh and Harriet Martineau and William Makepeace Thackeray of London. Smith was also an encouragement to her in her writing.

Stevens's success waned somewhat in the later 1850s and she sold her copyrights in 1861. After 1852, she lived mainly in London and abroad, but she moved to Folkestone in 1872, where she died the following year.

== Writings ==
Crowe's two plays, the verse tragedy Aristodemus (1838) and the melodrama The Cruel Kindness (1853), both had historical themes paralleling her own family problems. Both were published and the second had a short run in London in 1853.

The book that established Crowe as a novelist was The Adventures of Susan Hopley (1847). It was followed by Men and Women (1844), the well-received The Story of Lily Dawson (1847), The Adventures of a Beauty (1852), and Linny Lockwood (1854). Though set in middle-class life, they had complicated, sensational plots, while also commenting on the predicaments of Victorian women brought up in seclusion to be mistreated by those men who did not subscribe to standards of decent behaviour. This aspect of her writing was emphasised particularly by later women writers in an appreciation in Women Novelists of Queen Victoria's Reign (1897). Susan Hopley was reprinted many times, and to her annoyance, dramatised and turned into a penny serial. Her stories were also in demand from periodicals such as the weekly Chambers' Edinburgh Journal and Dickens's Household Words.

The play Susan Hopley; or, The Vicissitudes of a Servant Girl, adapted from Crowe's novel by George Dibdin Pitt, opened at the Royal Victoria Theatre in 1841 and became a long-running success. By 1849, it had been performed 343 times.

Crowe turned increasingly to supernatural subjects, inspired by German writers. Her collection The Night-side of Nature (1848) became her most popular work and was reprinted as recently as 2000. It was translated into German and French, and is said to have influenced the views of Charles Baudelaire. Her own involvement in such matters came to a bizarre culmination in February 1854, when she was discovered naked in Edinburgh one night, convinced that spirits had rendered her invisible. She was treated for mental illness and was said to have recovered. Two of her ghost stories reappeared in Victorian Ghost Stories (1936), edited by Montague Summers.

Crowe also wrote a number of books for children, including versions of Uncle Tom's Cabin for young readers, Pippie's Warning; or, Mind Your Temper (1848), The Story of Arthur Hunter and his First Shilling (1861) and The Adventures of a Monkey (1862).

== Works ==
- Aristodemus: A Tragedy (Edinburgh: William Tait, 1838)
- Adventures of Susan Hopley; or Circumstantial Evidence (London: Saunders & Otley, 1841), 3 volumes
- Men and Women or, Manorial Rights (London: Saunders and Otley, 1843), 3 volumes
- The Story of Lilly Dawson. (London: Henry Colburn, 1847), 3 volumes
- Pippie's Warning; or, Mind your Temper (London: Arthur Hall & Co., 1848)
- The Night-Side of Nature, or, Ghosts and Ghost-seers (London: T. C. Newby, 1848), 2 volumes
- Light and Darkness; or, Mysteries of Life (London: Henry Colburn, 1850), 3 volumes
- The Adventures of a Beauty (London: Colburn and Co., 1852), 3 volumes
- The Cruel Kindness: A Romantic Play, in Five Acts – as performed at the Theatre Royal Haymarket, London, on Monday 6 June 1853
- Linny Lockwood: A Novel (London: George Routledge & Co., 1854), 2 volumes
- Ghosts and Family Legends: A Volume for Christmas (London: Thomas Cautley Newby, 1859)
- The Story of Arthur Hunter and His First Shilling, with Other Tales (London: James Hogg & Sons, 1861)
- The Adventures of a Monkey: An Interesting Narrative (London: Dean and Son, 1862)
