= Oldbury rock shelters =

Cave and archaeological site in the United Kingdom

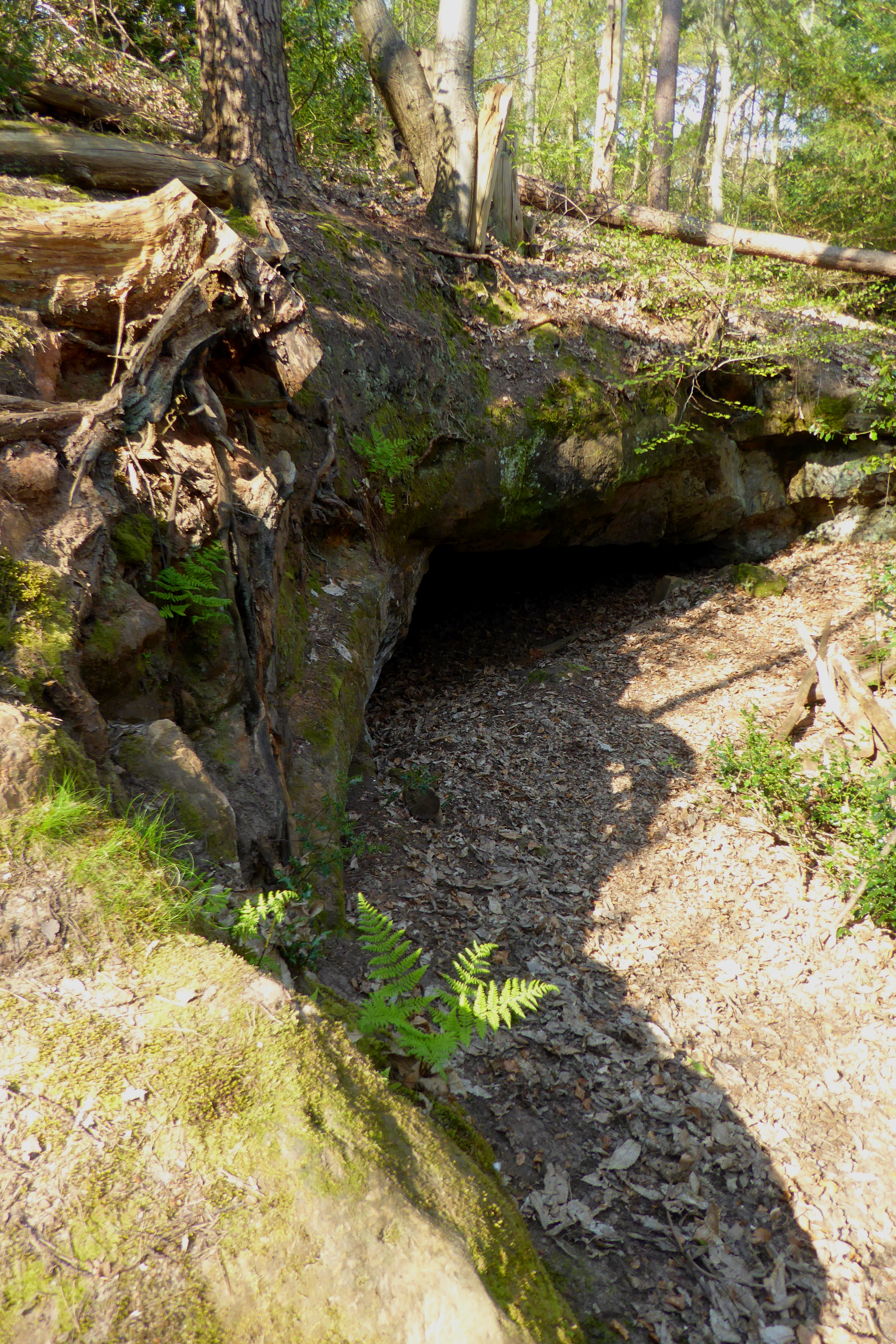
- The southern rock shelter

- location in Kent
- 51°17′9.8″N 0°16′9.6″E
- Periods: Middle Palaeolithic
- Cultures: Mousterian
- Location: Oldbury hillfort near Ightham
- Region: Kent

The Oldbury rock shelters are a complex of Middle Palaeolithic sites situated on the slopes of Oldbury hillfort near Ightham in the English county of Kent.

They were occupied by Mousterian flint tool manufacturers around 50,000 years ago and examples of their characteristic bout-coupé handaxes were found there during excavations in the nineteenth and twentieth centuries.

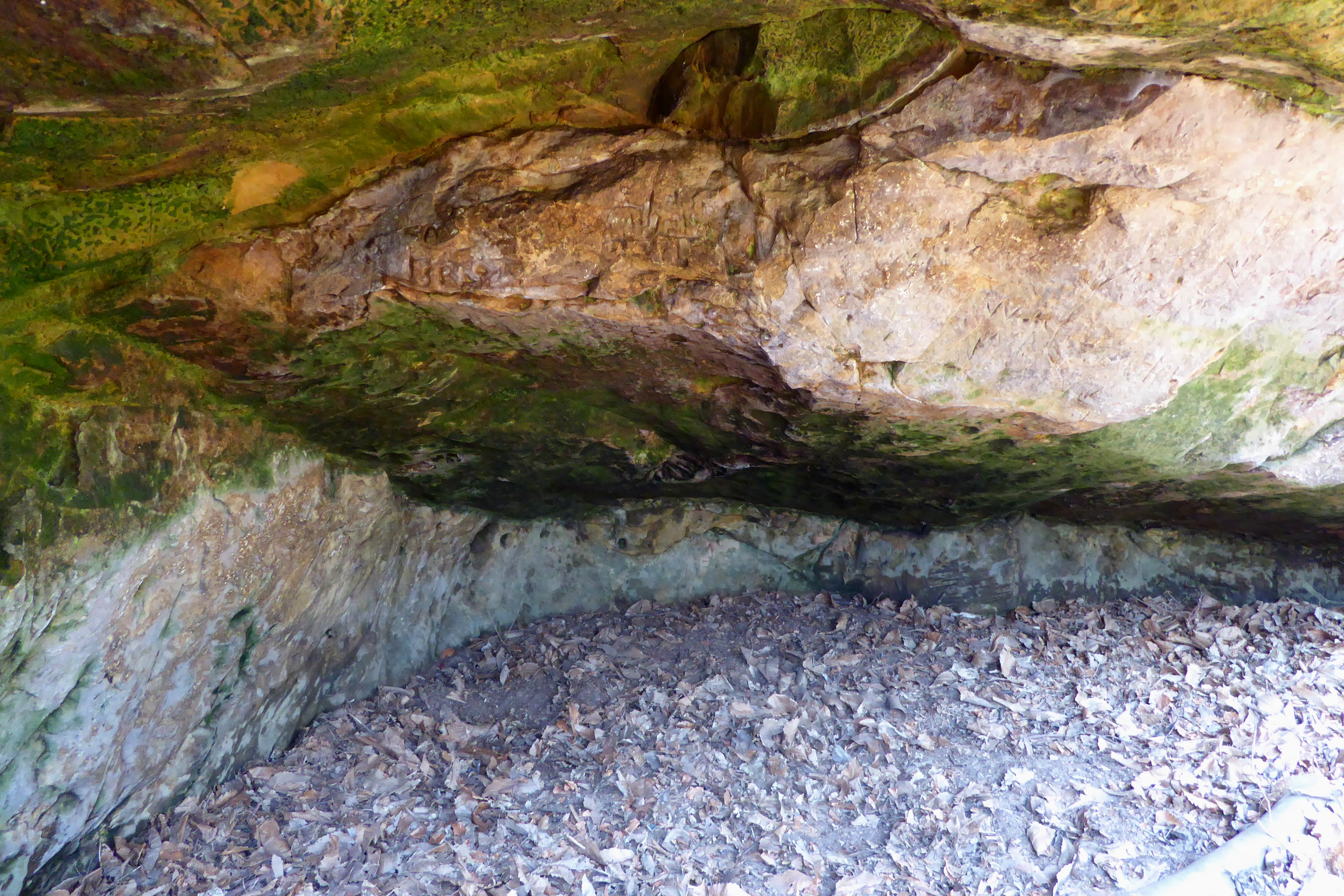
The interior of the southern rock shelter

The site is open to the public and owned by the National Trust.
