= Ficron =

Type of prehistoric stone tool

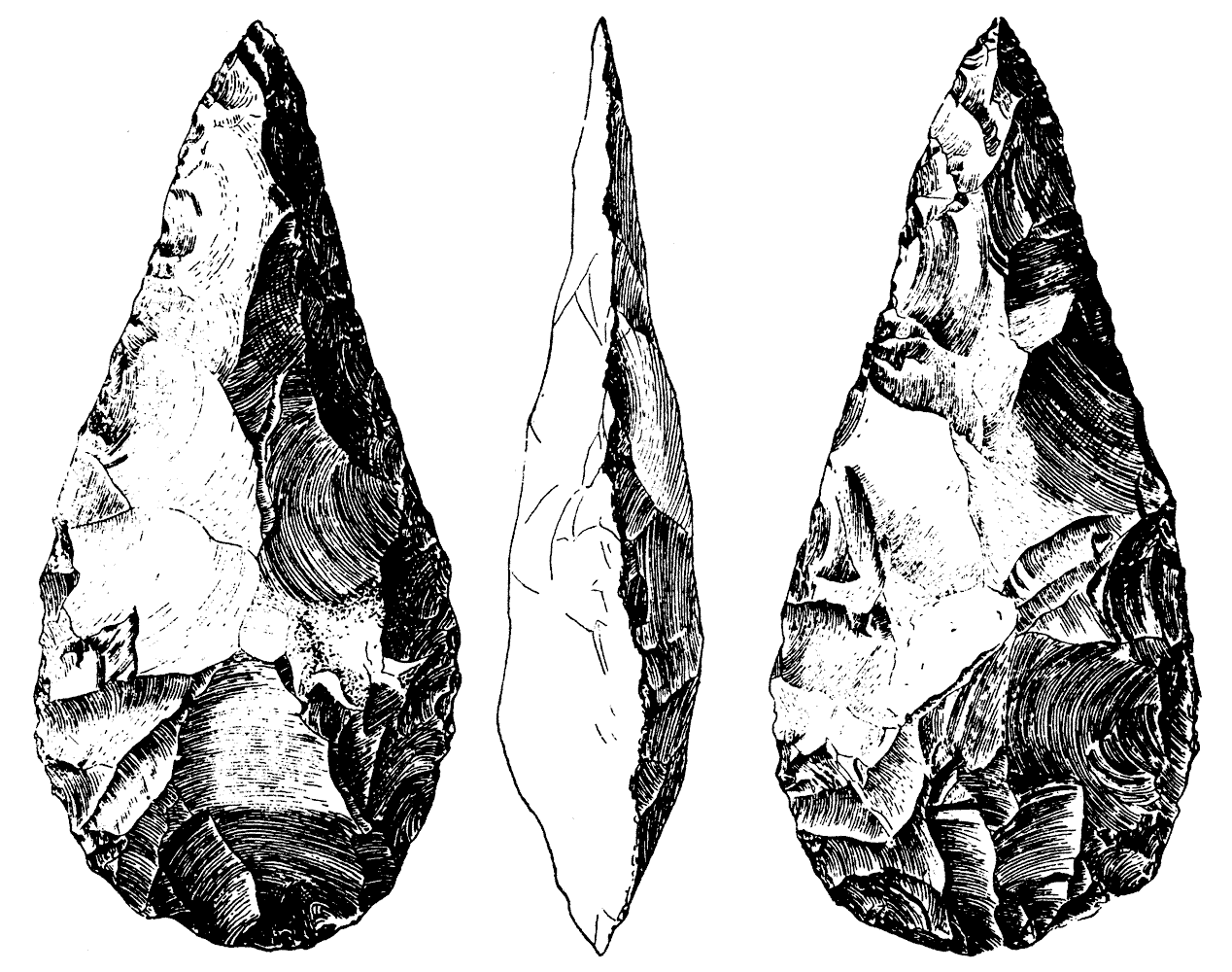
Front and side view of a ficron

A ficron handaxe is the name given to a type of prehistoric stone tool biface with long, curved sides and a pointed, well-made tip. They are found in Lower Palaeolithic, Middle Palaeolithic and Acheulean contexts, and are some of the oldest tools ever created by humans. The tool was named by the French archaeologist François Bordes.

== Production process ==
Like other types of handaxes, ficrons are created through a process called flint-knapping or lithic reduction. This involves a process of percussing the stone with a hard hammer such as a stone, a soft hammer such as a bone or antler, and pressure flaking using a punch made of bone or antler.

== Distribution ==
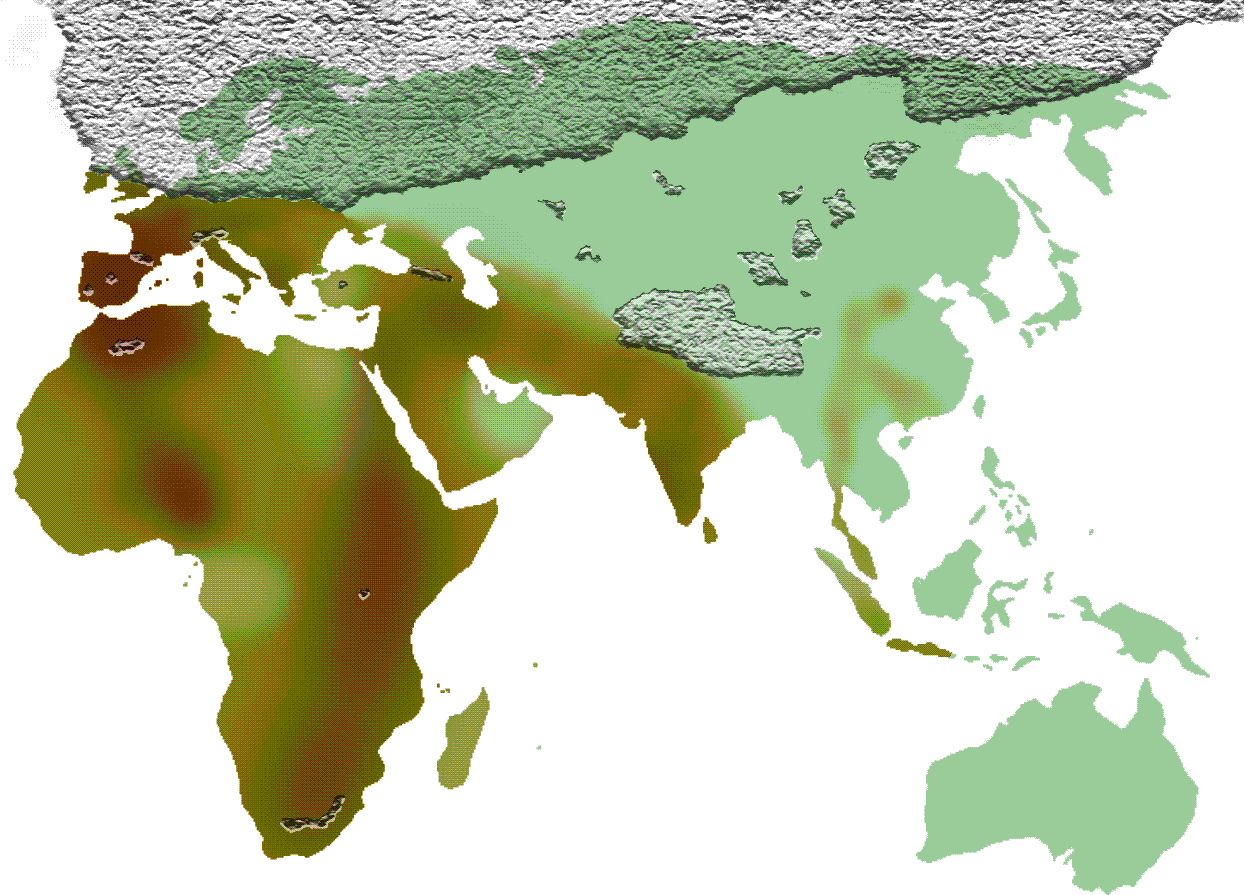
Spread of handaxe cultures Areas with handaxes Areas without handaxes

=== Africa ===
Acheulean tools such as ficrons can be found in the rift valley of Kenya, and sites such as Gona and Bouri in Ethiopia, where early humans and others evolved. As these groups found their way out of Africa, the tools went with them.

=== Great Britain ===
However, Great Britain has also yielded its share of ficrons, found in gravel pits and fluvial deposits. Swanscombe Heritage Park is famous for its many archaeological discoveries, including ficrons. Because Britain was often covered in ice during the Paleolithic Age, it was only inhabitable between glacial periods. As glaciers melted, tools were swept into gravels where they are discovered today.
