= Oldbury Camp =

Hillfort in Kent, England

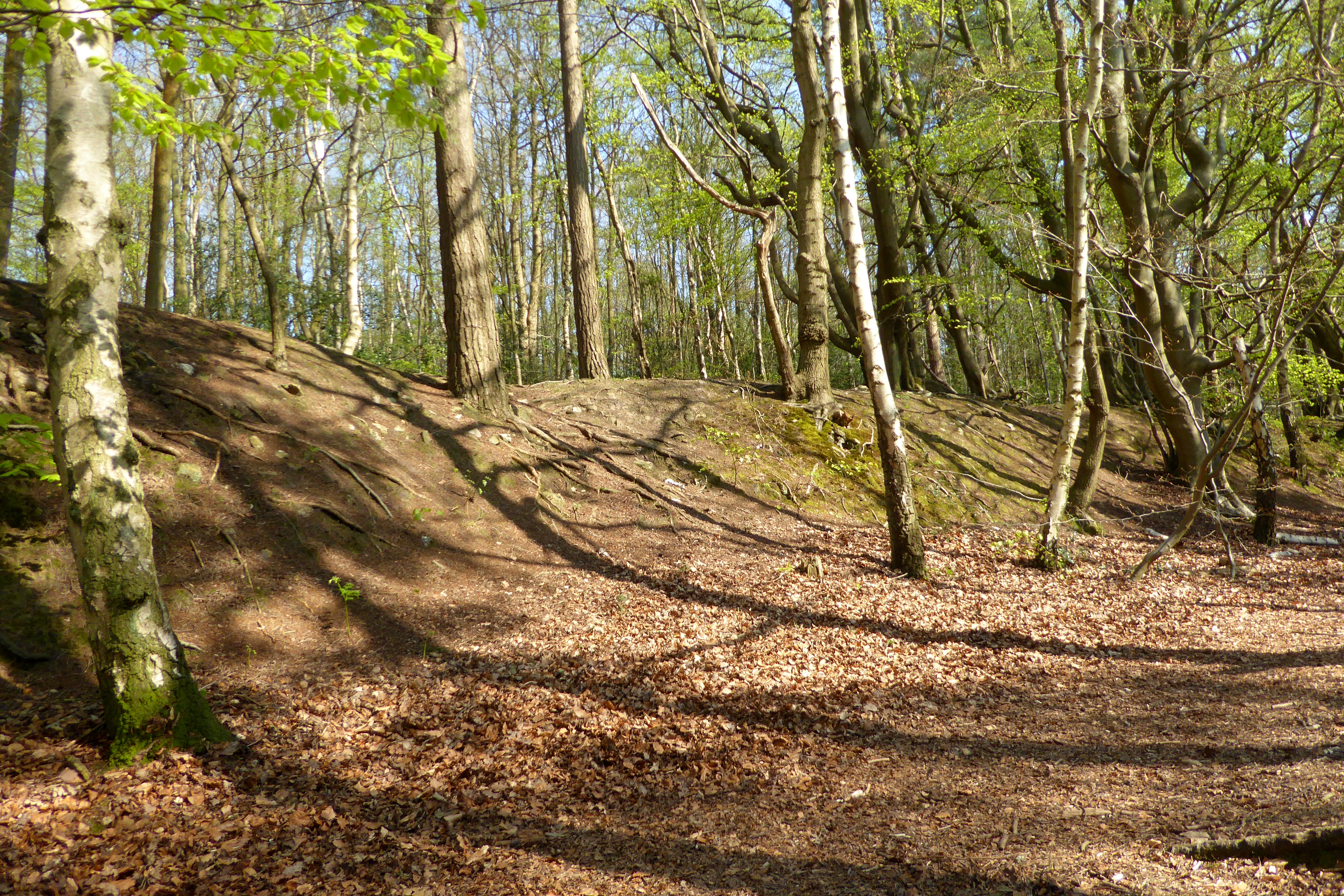
Bank on the southwestern ramparts of the hillfort

Oldbury Camp (also known as Oldbury hill fort) is the largest Iron Age hill fort in south-eastern England. It was built in the 1st century BC by Celtic British tribes on a hilltop west of Ightham, Kent, in a strategic location overlooking routes through the Kentish Weald. The fort comprises a bank and ditch enclosing an area of about 50 hectares (120 acres), with entrances at the north-east and south ends. Wooden gates barred the entrances. Archaeological excavations carried out in the 1930s and 1980s found that the hill fort's interior had probably not been permanently occupied. It had been abandoned around 50 BC and the north-east gate had been burned down, possibly due to a Roman invasion. The wooded southern part of Oldbury Camp is now owned and managed by the National Trust and is open to the public.

== Description ==
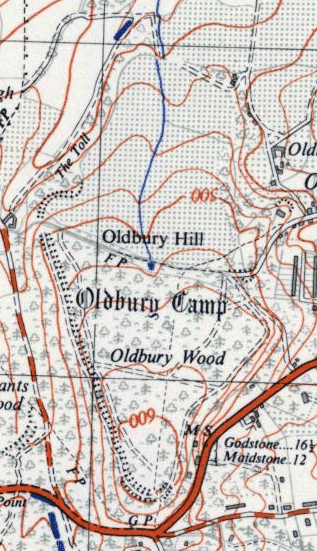
Ordnance Survey map of Oldbury Camp

Oldbury Camp is located near the village of Ightham, Kent. It is situated on the summit of Oldbury Hill, a partly wooded plateau on a north–south alignment on the Greensand Ridge. It is bounded by very steep natural cliffs on the eastern side, with commanding views over one of the main routes through the Weald. The hill fort covers an area of around 50 hectares (120 acres) and is of the multivallate type; while its defences mostly comprise a single bank and ditch surrounding the north, west and south of the hilltop, in a few places the bank is doubled to provide extra defences. The bank probably originally stood about 10 metres (33 ft) high, though it survives only to a height of about 1 metre (3 ft 3 in), while the ditch is up to 3.5 metres (11 ft) wide and is situated about 3 metres (9.8 ft) below the bank's crest.

At least two entrances were constructed, on the north-east and southern ends of the hill fort. A spring is located near the centre of the site and would have ensured a constant supply of fresh water for the hill fort's defenders. Overhangs and hollows in the rocks on the eastern side of the hill fort were occupied as long ago as the Middle Palaeolithic period and are now known as the Oldbury rock shelters.

== History ==
The hill fort was constructed during the first century BC, likely in a rapidly executed project carried out on a massive scale. Around 100 BC, a V-shaped ditch about 1.5 metres (4 ft 11 in) deep was initially cut to form the outer perimeter of Oldbury Camp and the spoil was heaped up to form a bank. The defences follow a rough diamond shape, measuring 1,350 metres (4,430 ft) north-south by 700 metres (2,300 ft) east-west. The eastern side above the cliffs was probably defended only by a wooden pallisade, as the cliffs there made it unnecessary to continue the bank and ditch along the escarpment.

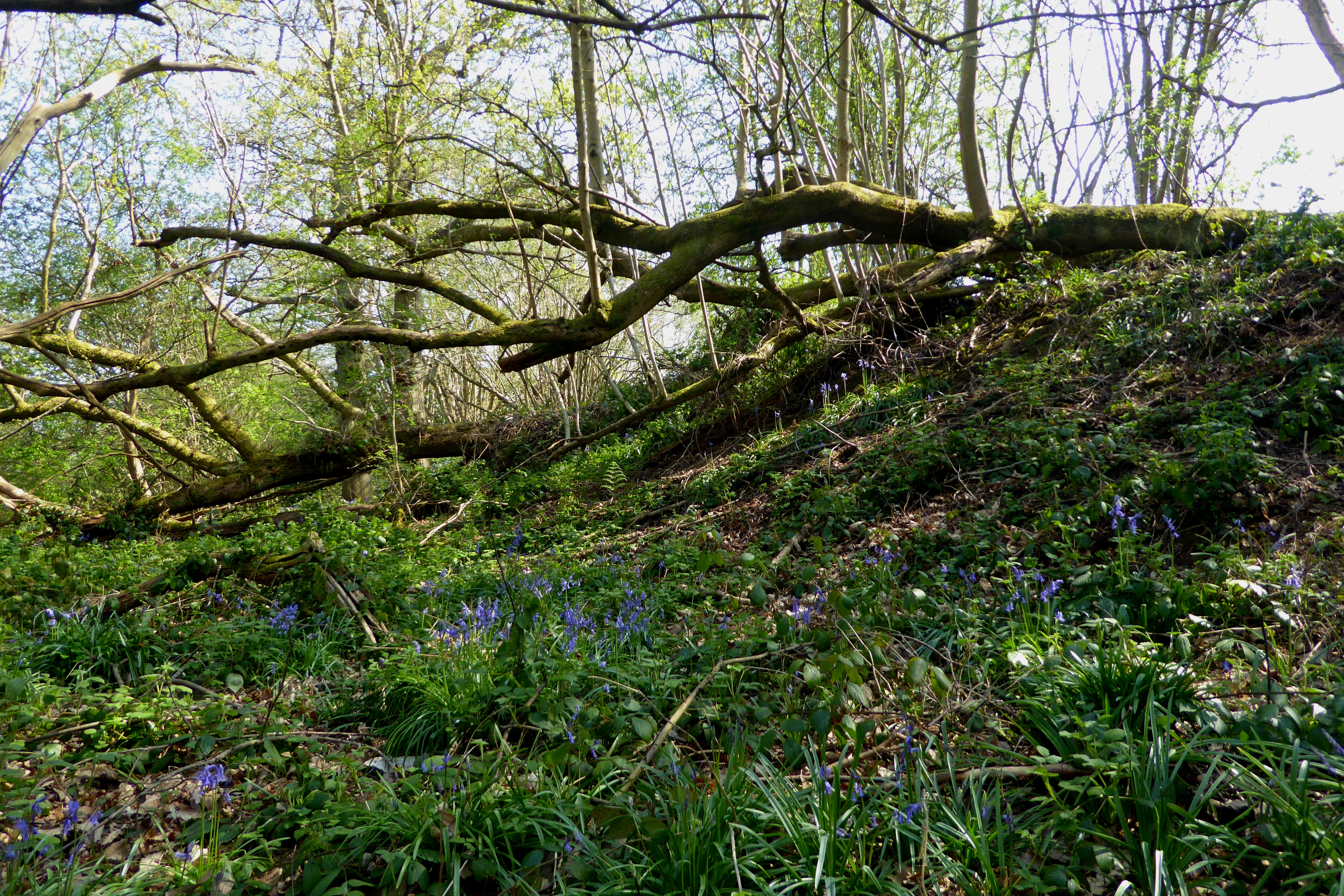
The northern bank of the hillfort

The defences were subsequently strengthened by adding further material to the bank to create a glacis. The ditch was widened to give it a wide, flat bottom of the Fécamp type, named after a Gaulish oppidum near the eponymous town in Normandy. A stone revetment was constructed at the north-east entrance, probably with a wooden breastwork, above and beside a heavy wooden gate protected by a defensive outwork. The gate was destroyed by burning and a large quantity of sling stones was found nearby. Another gate was constructed at the south entrance but has been badly damaged by the construction of a modern road. It is not clear whether buildings existed in the hill fort's interior, although large quantities of pottery have been discovered there. Oldbury Camp was probably used only as a temporary shelter or a place of refuge, rather than as the site of a permanent settlement.

The reasons for the construction and eventual abandonment of Oldbury Camp are unclear, but it may have been built by a local tribe seeking to resist the invasion at the time of the Belgae, a tribal confederation from northern Gaul. They were evidently unsuccessful as the Belgae conquered and settled in Kent. The fort was abandoned around the time of Caesar's invasions of Britain in 55 and 54 BC and may have been attacked by the Romans, if the burned northern gate indicates an assault rather than slighting by retreating defenders. Parts of the site appear to have been reused for quarrying during the Roman period.

== Excavations ==
Oldbury Camp has been excavated archaeologically twice: once in 1938 by John Bryan Ward-Perkins and again in 1983–84. While the 1938 excavations suggested that the hill fort had been built in two phases about half a century apart, this theory was abandoned as a result of the 1983–84 excavations determining that it was instead constructed as a single rapidly executed project. It had previously been thought that modifications to the defences were the result of the Belgae refortifying it against the Roman invasion but this now seems unlikely.

== Access ==
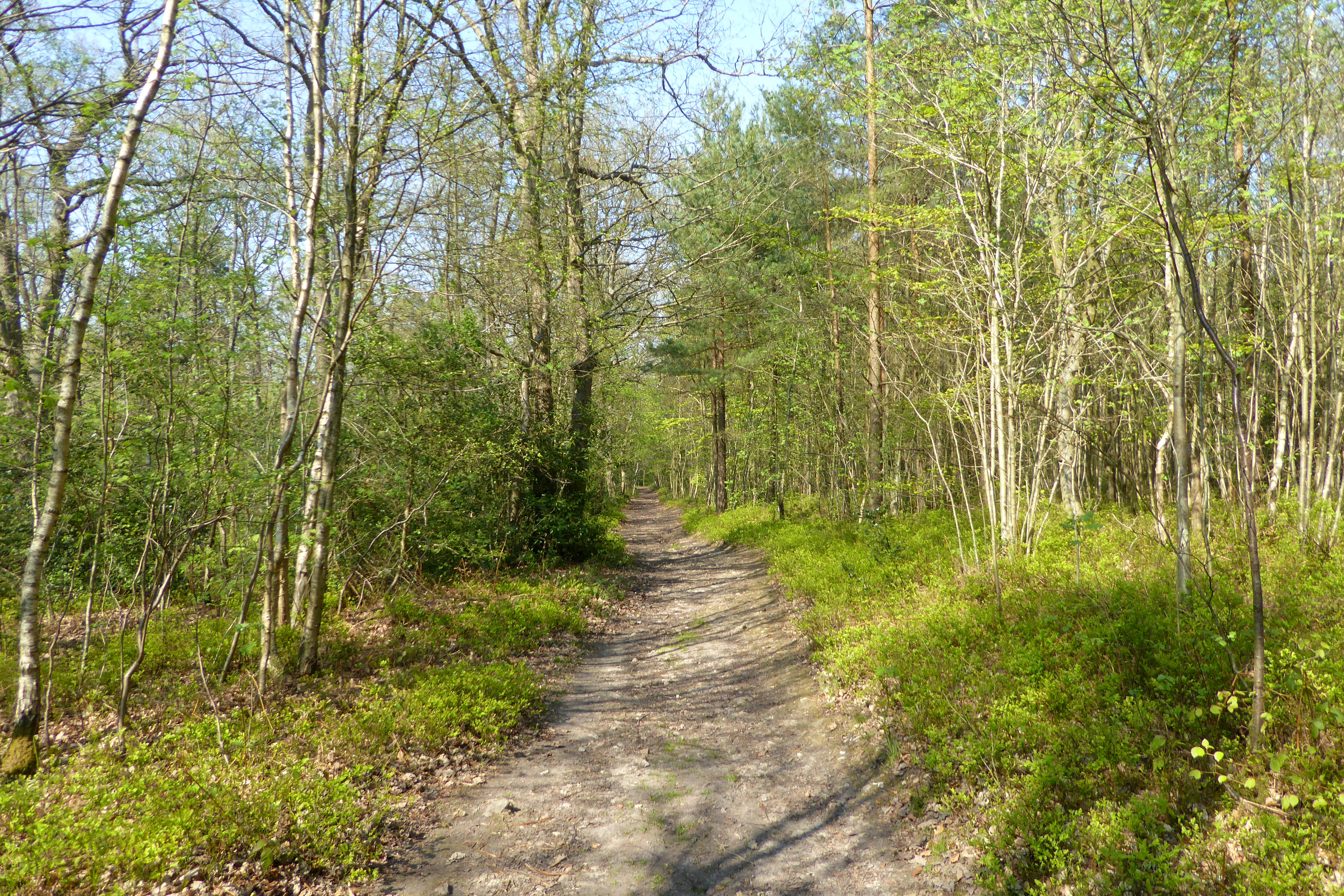
The southern half of the interior of the hillfort is now forested and under the ownership of the National Trust

The southern part of Oldbury Hill and Styants Wood immediately to the west is now in the ownership of the National Trust, which acquired it in 1945, and is open to the public. It is managed by Kent County Council. The northern part is privately owned farmland, but is covenanted to protect it. A section to the west of Upper Spring lane is also privately owned but open to the Public.

== External links and further reading ==
- Oldbury Hill – National Trust
- An archaeological brief - Commissioned by the national Trust in 2020 by HB Archaeology & Conservation Ltd.
- Historic England records.
