= Bout-coupé =

In archaeology, a bout-coupé is a type of handaxe that constituted part of the Neanderthal Mousterian industry of the Middle Palaeolithic. The handaxes are bifacially-worked and in the shape of a rounded triangle.

They are only found in Britain in the Marine Isotope Stage 3 (MIS 3) interglacial between 59,000 and 41,000 years BP; therefore, they are considered a unique diagnostic variant.
