= A28 road =

Primary route in Kent and East Sussex

A28

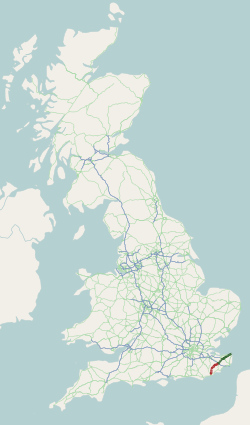

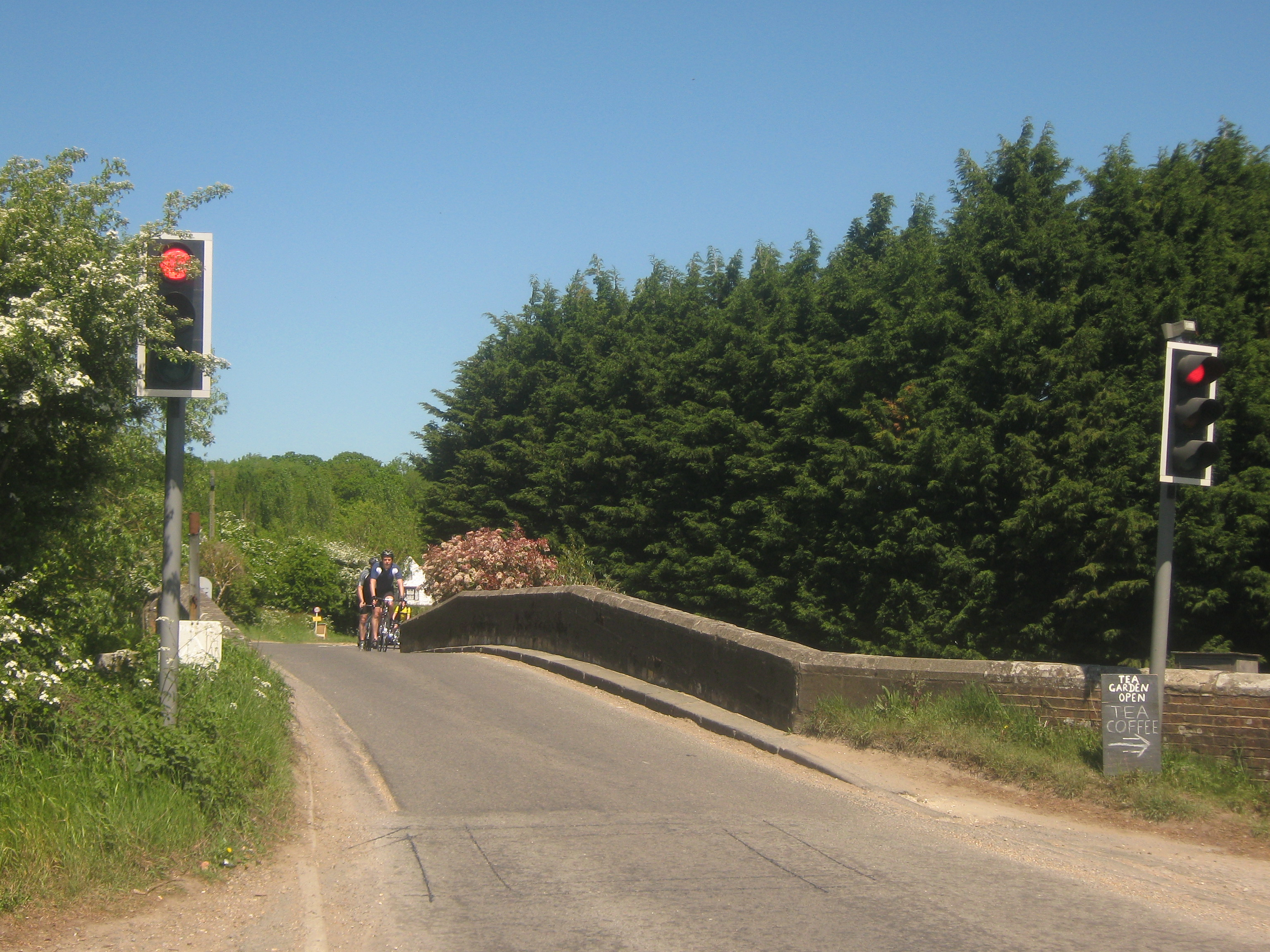
- The A28 Newenden Bridge over the River Rother

Route information
- Length: 58.6 mi (94.3 km)

Major junctions
- North east end: A254 in Margate

- A299 near St Nicholas-at-Wade A253 at Sarre A2 in Canterbury
- South west end: A21 in North Hastings (Baldslow)

Location
- Country: United Kingdom
- Counties: Kent, East Sussex
- Primary destinations: Ramsgate; Ashford; Canterbury

Road network
- Roads in the United Kingdom; Motorways; A and B road zones

The A28 is a road in the counties of Kent and East Sussex in south east England, connecting Margate, Canterbury, Ashford and Hastings.

Starting at the seaside resort of Margate at the north-east point of Kent, the A28 runs inland and west-southwest to the cathedral city of Canterbury, before passing through the chalk hills of the North Downs via the gap cut by the River Stour, to the town of Ashford in the Vale of Holmesdale. From here, the A28 proceeds via the market town of Tenterden, to the East Sussex seaside town of Hastings, on the English Channel.

== Route ==
The A28 leaves Margate via the seaside resorts of Westgate and Birchington, and then heads inland reaching open countryside at the village of Sarre, after which the road roughly parallels both the Ashford-Ramsgate railway line and the Great Stour river on their combined route to Canterbury and then Ashford.

From Sarre, the road passes through the villages of Upstreet, Hersden and Sturry, and then to the city of Canterbury. It forms part of Canterbury's ring road before leaving via Wincheap and Thanington Without, where a sliproad linking to the A2 was completed in 2011.

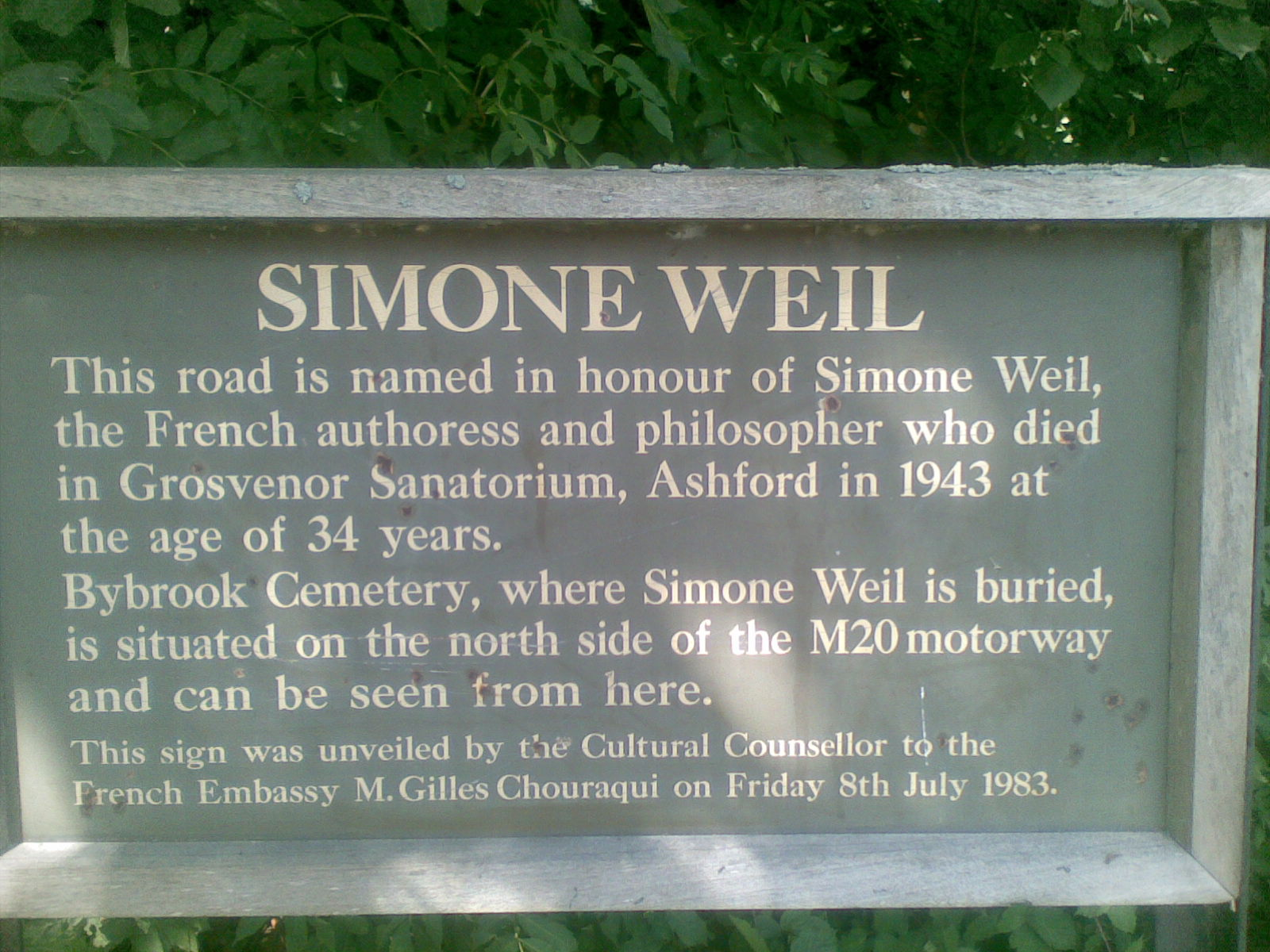
The commemorative plaque for Simone Weil Avenue, a section of the A28 as it runs through Ashford

The A28 passes between the North Downs via the villages of Chartham, Chilham, Godmersham and Bilting, to enter the Vale of Holmesdale. The road reaches surburbia again at Kennington, a suburb of Ashford, but the A28 then skirts around the town centre of Ashford on a section of dual carriageway, where it has a junction with the A20. In 1983, this section was named Simone Weil Avenue, in honour of the French philosopher and mystic who is buried nearby in Bybrook Cemetery. Bypassing the village of Great Chart, the road runs south-west around the Kentish Weald via the villages of Bethersden and High Halden, to the market town of Tenterden.

The A28 continues via the villages of Rolvenden and Newenden before crossing Newenden Bridge over the River Rother and entering East Sussex via Northiam. After the village of Brede there is a bridge over the River Brede. Next is Westfield, just before the road climbs to terminate at its junction with the A21 just north of Hastings.

== History ==
Several sections of the A28 were originally turnpike roads.

The route between Canterbury and Ashford was established in 1762 by the Faversham, Ashford, Hythe and Canterbury Trust as part of a network connecting the two locations to Hythe and Faversham. Tollgates were established at Kempe's Corner, where the A28 meets the road from Boughton Aluph to Wye, and at Wincheap. The former still stands today. In 1822-23, £524 was collected in tolls from this section of the road. Between 1830 and 1832, the road was re-aligned between Wincheap and Shalmsford Street, and Chilham and Godmersham, to give a more direct and faster route, which remains part of the A28 today.

The route between Ashford and Tenderden was turnpiked in 1793, while the section between Sarre and Canterbury was turnpiked in 1802.

Newenden Bridge was constructed in 1706. It is only wide enough for one vehicle, and is controlled by traffic lights. There is no alternative route for pedestrians. It was Grade II* listed in 1961.

== Improvements ==
The Great Chart Bypass opened in June 1984, as a 2.8-kilometre (1.7-mile) single carriageway road.

Work has continued to improve the A28 into the 21st century. In 2011 a new slip road was completed to connect the road to the A2 in Canterbury.

A scheme to improve the A28 in south Ashford was proposed in 2016, widening the road to give a continuous dual carriageway between the M20 and the Great Chart Bypass. This has since been postponed. The same year, average speed cameras were installed on the A28 between Birchington and the Thanet Way after a series of fatal accidents.

In 2019, the government announced a £49.8 million package to relieve traffic on the A28 through Thanet by improving the parallel Shottendane Road.

In mid-2024, Newenden Bridge was proposed to be closed for three month for safety improvements. Local residents would have been cut off from either side of the river, with no possible access other than a lengthy detour.
