= Lossenham Friary =

Friary in Kent, England

Coordinates: 51°1′13″N 0°37′24″E

Lossenham Friary was a Carmelite friary in Newenden in the Weald of Kent, England.

== History ==
Sir Thomas Alcher or Aucher founded the third Carmelite friary in England northeast of Newenden village in around 1242. It burnt down in 1275 but was rebuilt. It was dissolved in 1538. The site became the property of the Culpeper family, the heirs of the Alchers. There are no visible remains but Hasted reports that foundations were uncovered south of Lossenham Manor House and a stone coffin was found in the late 18th century.
