= Listed buildings in Newenden =

Historic structures in Kent, England

Newenden is a village and civil parish in the Borough of Ashford of Kent, England. It contains one grade II* and 16 grade II listed buildings that are recorded in the National Heritage List for England.

This list is based on the information retrieved online from Historic England.

== Key ==
Grade	Criteria
I	Buildings that are of exceptional interest
II*	Particularly important buildings of more than special interest
II	Buildings that are of special interest

== Listing ==
Name	Grade	Location	Type	Completed (Note: The date given is the date used by Historic England as significant for the initial building or that of an important part in the structure's description.)	Date designated	Grid ref. (Note: The grid reference is based on the British national grid reference system, sometimes known as OSGB36, used by the Ordnance Survey.) Geo-coordinates	Notes	Entry number (Note: The "List Entry Number" is a unique number assigned to each listed building and scheduled monument by Historic England.)	Image	Wikidata
Church Cottage	II				9 August 1979	TQ8347927316; 51°00′57″N 0°36′52″E		1116369	Upload Photo	Q26409993
Hill House	II				9 August 1979	TQ8302727576; 51°01′06″N 0°36′29″E		1116374	Upload Photo	Q26409997
Little Frogs	II				9 August 1979	TQ8297227668; 51°01′09″N 0°36′27″E		1362915	Upload Photo	Q26644775
Newenden Bridge Rother Bridge	II				16 August 1962	TQ8351727046; 51°00′49″N 0°36′53″E		1070943	Newenden Bridge Rother Bridge More images	Q17555906
Parish Church of St Peter	II*				16 August 1962	TQ8343327306; 51°00′57″N 0°36′50″E		1116453	Parish Church of St Peter More images	Q17556290
The White Hart Inn	II				9 August 1979	TQ8343127268; 51°00′56″N 0°36′49″E		1070942	The White Hart Inn More images	Q26325590
White Hart Oast House	II				27 October 1993	TQ8342227239; 51°00′55″N 0°36′49″E		1275654	Upload Photo	Q26565218
Lossenham Lodge	II	Lossenham Lane, Lossenham Manor			4 November 1977	TQ8387427692; 51°01′09″N 0°37′13″E		1362917	Upload Photo	Q26644777
Lossenham Manor	II	Lossenham Lane, Lossenham Manor			4 November 1977	TQ8403427792; 51°01′12″N 0°37′21″E		1116351	Upload Photo	Q26409975
Manor Cottage	II	Lossenham Lane			9 August 1979	TQ8374627349; 51°00′58″N 0°37′06″E		1116345	Upload Photo	Q26409970
Old Timbers	II	Lossenham Lane			9 August 1979	TQ8385927395; 51°01′00″N 0°37′12″E		1362916	Upload Photo	Q26644776
Owls Oast	II	Lossenham Lane, Lossenham Manor			4 November 1977	TQ8399427811; 51°01′13″N 0°37′19″E		1070946	Upload Photo	Q26325597
Pear Tree Cottage	II	Lossenham Lane			9 August 1979	TQ8353727294; 51°00′57″N 0°36′55″E		1319992	Upload Photo	Q26606040
Rotherview	II	1, 2 and 3, Lossenham Lane			18 January 1973	TQ8349527295; 51°00′57″N 0°36′53″E		1070944	Upload Photo	Q26325595
The Old Barn	II	Lossenham Lane, Lossenham Manor			4 November 1977	TQ8400827812; 51°01′13″N 0°37′20″E		1116299	Upload Photo	Q26409927
K6 Telephone Kiosk	II	Rye Road Lossenham Lane			1 October 2010	TQ8343627284; 51°00′56″N 0°36′50″E		1393994	Upload Photo	Q26673124

== See also ==
- Grade I listed buildings in Kent
- Grade II* listed buildings in Kent

== Sources ==
- Newman, John (2012) [1969], Kent: West and the Weald, The Buildings of England, New Haven and London: Yale University Press, ISBN 978-0-300-18509-6
