= Newenden Bridge =

Coordinates: 51.013476°N 0.614766°E

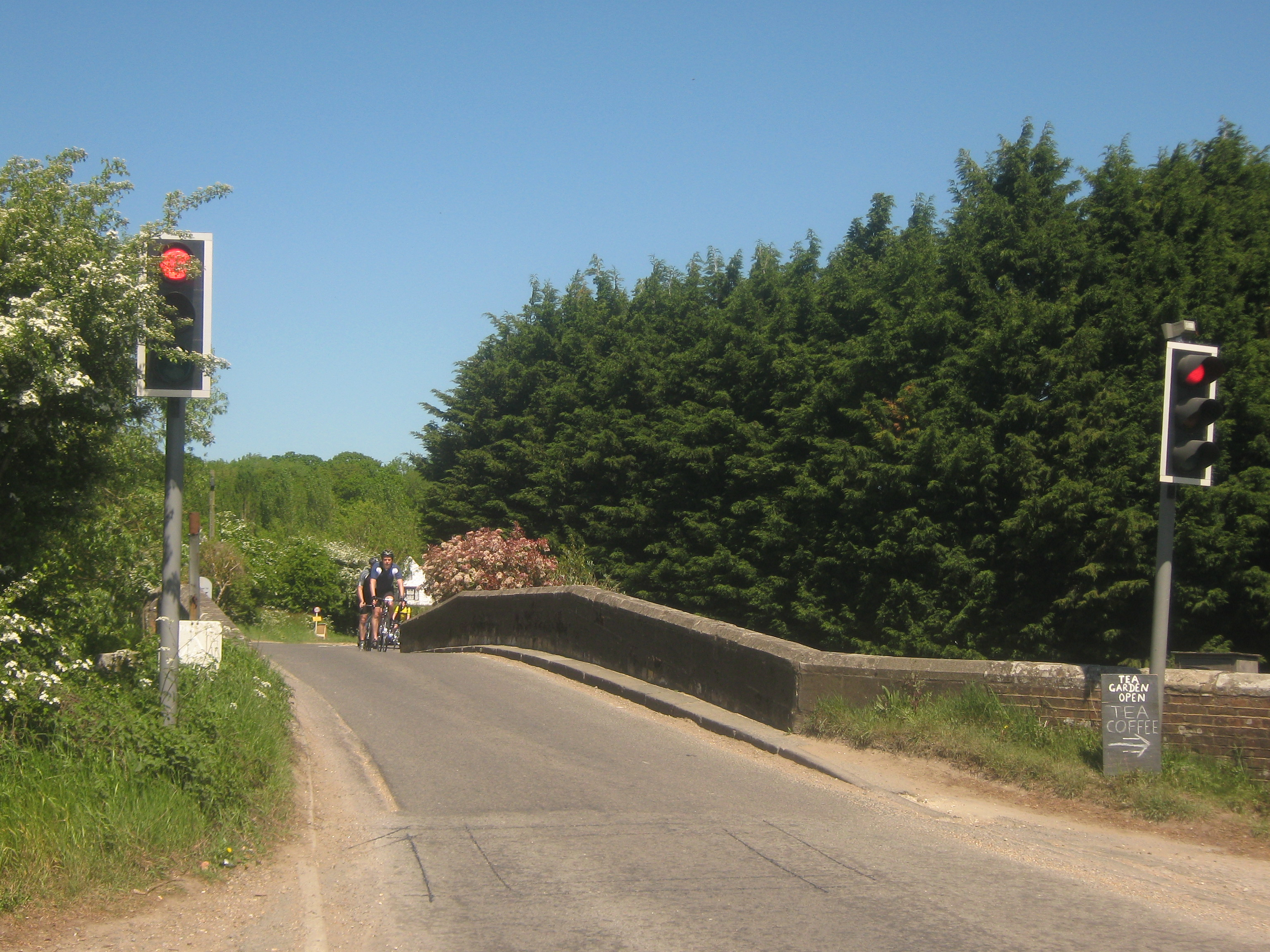
The bridge in 2010

Newenden Bridge (also known as Rother Bridge) is a Grade II* listed road bridge and scheduled monument in Newenden, carrying the A28 between Tenterden and Hastings over the River Rother. It crosses the county boundary between Kent and Sussex.

== History ==
The bridge was constructed in 1706 as a joint venture between Kent and Sussex councils, according to an inscription on the parapet. It is a multi-span bridge constructed of sandstone and features three medieval style round-head arches. The downstream side to the east features shouldered buttresses, while the upstream side to the west has pointed cut-waters. The lower portion of these has been reinforced with white brick at a later date.

It was listed as a scheduled monument in 1932, and Grade II* listed in 1961.

== Traffic and Maintenance ==
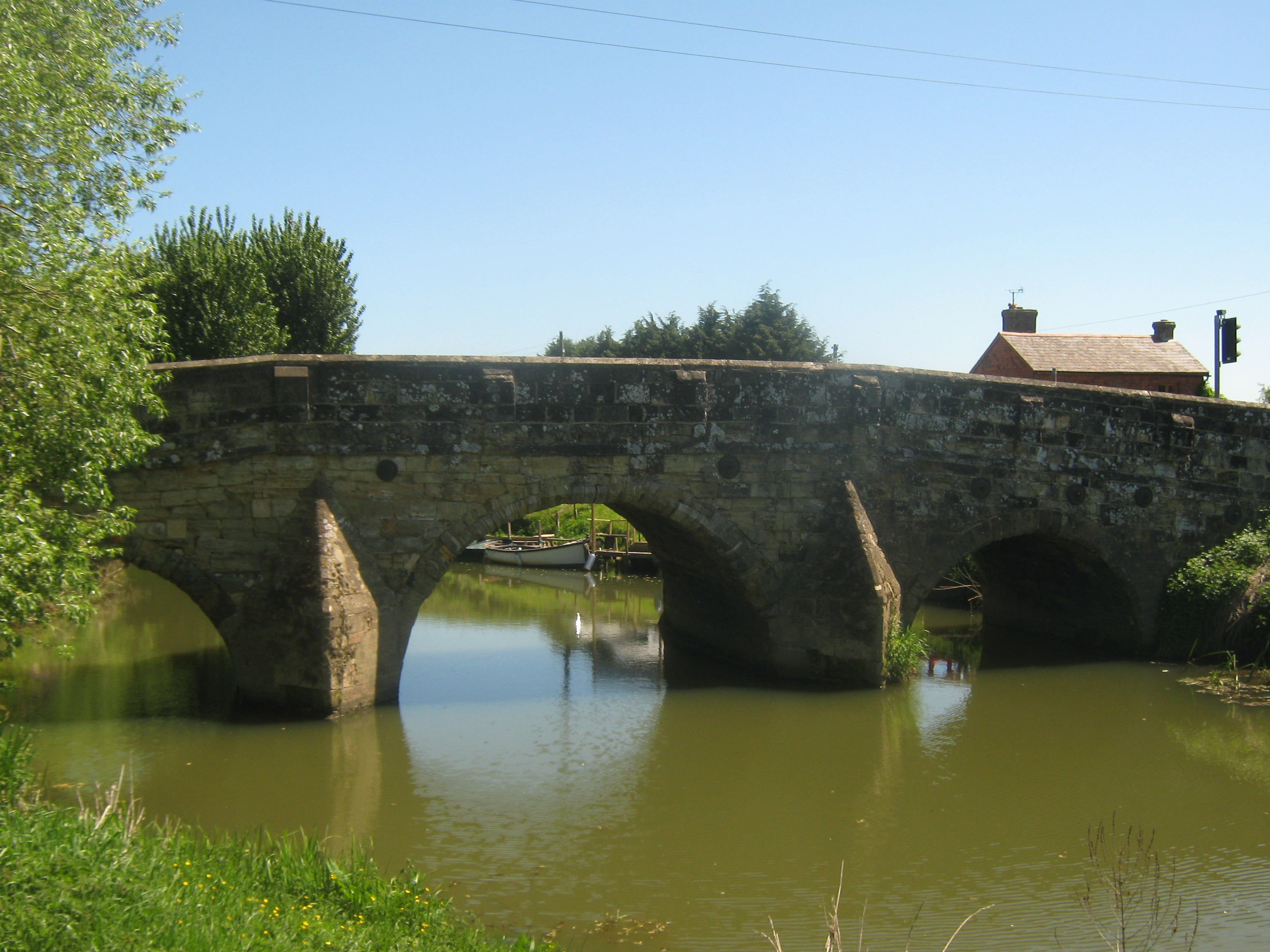
Side view of the bridge from the River Rother

Though the bridge has had a small amount of repairs and changes, it has largely survived intact from its original 18th century construction, and still includes its original timbers. However, it now carries heavy goods vehicles across it regularly, which makes it unsuitable for modern day use. The bridge is single-track and controlled by traffic lights. There is no footpath across the bridge, so pedestrian traffic has to mix with vehicles, making it a dangerous crossing. A local councillor said "the only option for pedestrians crossing is to run the gauntlet between the change of lights".

The bridge's stonework underwent repair in the late 20th century.

In mid-2024, it was scheduled to be closed for maintenance for three months, resulting in a lengthy detour for traffic. This was later postponed to 2025.

River cruises run from the bridge upstream along the Rother to Bodiam Castle.
