= Turnpike trusts in South East England =

Historic road maintenance bodies in England

This is a list of turnpike trusts that maintained roads in South East England.

Between 1663 and 1836, the Parliament of Great Britain and the Parliament of the United Kingdom passed a series of acts of Parliament that created organisations – turnpike trusts – that collected road tolls, and used the money to repair the road. These applied to major roads, around a fifth of the road network. The turnpike system was phased out in the 1870s, and major roads transitioned in the 1880s to the maintenance of the new county councils.

The counties used for these lists are the historic counties of England that existed at the time of the turnpike trusts. This article lists those in the south east of England: Berkshire, Buckinghamshire, Hampshire, Kent, Middlesex, Oxfordshire, Surrey and Sussex.

== Berkshire ==
| Trust | Founded | Initial act | |
| Trust | Founded | Citation | Title |
|---|---|---|---|
| Abingdon and Fyfield Turnpike Trust | 1755 | 28 Geo. 2. c. 42 | Oxford and Buckinghamshire Roads Act 1755; An Act for enlarging the Term and Powers granted by an Act passed in the Ninth Year of the Reign of His present Majesty, for repairing the Roads leading from Henley Bridge[k] in the County of Oxford, to Dorchester Bridge, and from thence to Culham Bridge, and to a Place called Mile Stone, in the Road leading to Magdalen Bridge, in the said County, and for widening the said Roads; and also for repairing and widening the Roads leading from the End of Culham Bridge next to Culham in the County of Oxford, to the End of Burford Bridge next to Abingdon in the County of Berks; and from The Mayor's Stone at the End of The Boar Street in the Town of Abingdon aforesaid, to Shippon in the said County of Berks, and from thence to the West End of the Town of Fyfield in the same County. |
| Abingdon, Wootton to Swinford Turnpike Trust | 1768 | 8 Geo. 3. c. 61 | Abingdon to Swinford Road Act 1768; An Act for repairing and widening the Road from the Mayor's Stone in Abingdon, in the County of Berks, through Cumner to the ancient Horse Road at Swinford, in the Said County. |
| Besselsleigh Turnpike Trust | 1771 | 11 Geo. 3. c. 97 | Berkshire and Wiltshire Roads Act 1771; An Act for amending and widening the Road from Besselsleigh through Wantage to Hungerford, in the County of Berks, and from Wantage to Marlborough, in the County of Wilts, and from the Turnpike Road between Reading and Watlingford through Halfpenny Lane to the Old Red House upon Wantage Downs, and from thence to Lamborn, in the said County of Berks. |
| Chilton Pond and Abingdon Turnpike Trust | 1756 | 29 Geo. 2. c. 81 | Berkshire Roads (No. 2) Act 1756; An Act for amending and keeping in Repair the Roads leading from a Place called Fryer Bacon's Study to Chilton Pond, and from the Top of Hincksey Hill to Foxcombe Hill Gate, in the Road leading to Farringdon in the County of Berks. |
| Fyfield, Newbridge and St John's Bridge Turnpike Trust | 1732 | 6 Geo. 2. c. 16 | Fyfield and St. John's Bridge Road Act 1732; An Act for repairing the Roads leading from a Place called St. John's Bridge, in the County of Berks, to a Place called Fyfield, in the said County. |
| Harwell and Streatley Turnpike Trust | 1803 | 43 Geo. 3. c. xcii | Harwell Road (Berkshire) Act 1803; An Act for amending, widening, improving, and keeping in Repair the Road leading from the London Turnpike Road near the South or upper End of Harwell Town in the Parish of Harwell, in the County of Berks, to the Turnpike Road near the Village of Streatley, in the said County. |
| Hinksey Road Turnpike Trust | 1756 | 29 Geo. 2. c. 81 | Berkshire Roads (No. 2) Act 1756; An Act for amending and keeping in Repair the Roads leading from a Place called Fryer Bacon's Study to Chilton Pond, and from the Top of Hincksey Hill to Foxcombe Hill Gate, in the Road leading to Farringdon in the County of Berks. |
| Hurley Turnpike Trust | 1717 | 4 Geo. 1. c. 6 Pr. | Maidenhead, Twyford and Henley Roads Act 1717; An Act for repairing the Highways from Maidenhead Bridge to Sunning Lane-end (next to Twiford) in the Road to Reading; and from the said Bridge to Henley Bridge, in the County of Berks. |
| Leckford or Sousley Water Turnpike Trust | 1772 | 12 Geo. 3. c. 85 | Wiltshire Roads (No. 2) Act 1772; An Act for repairing and widening the Road from the End of the present Turnpike Road from Besselsleigh to Hungerford, in the County of Berks, to Leckford, otherwise Sousley Water, in the County of Wilts. |
| Maidenhead Turnpike Trust | 1717 | 4 Geo. 1. c. 6 Pr. | Maidenhead, Twyford and Henley Roads Act 1717; An Act for repairing the Highways from Maidenhead Bridge to Sunning Lane-end (next to Twiford) in the Road to Reading; and from the said Bridge to Henley Bridge, in the County of Berks. |
| Maidenhead to Cookham Turnpike Trust | 1779 | 19 Geo. 3. c. 84 | Maidenhead Roads Act 1779; An Act for widening and repairing a Lane called Pitt's or Sheppard's Lane, leading from the Market House in the Town of Maidenhead, in the County of Berks, towards Cookham, in the said County; and for turning the Course of the present Road leading from Ray Mills and Cookham, to the Turnpike Road near Maidenhead aforesaid. |
| New Windsor and Twyford Turnpike Trust | 1832 | 2 & 3 Will. 4. c. xvii | New Windsor and Twyford Road Act 1832; An Act for making and maintaining a Road from New Windsor in the County of Berks to the Village of Twyford in the Parish of Hurst in the said County and County of Wilts. |
| New Windsor to Datchet Turnpike Trust | 1801 | 41 Geo. 3. (U.K.) c. xxxvii | New Windsor, Longford and Datchet Roads Act 1801; An act for making and maintaining a road from the town of New Windsor in the county of Berks, into the London road, at or near a bridge called High Bridge, near Longford in the county of Middlesex; and for amending, widening, and keeping in repair, the road leading from and out of the said road at Southley in the parish of Datchet, to the village of Datchet in the county of Bucks. |
| Reading and Basingstoke Turnpike Trust | 1717 | 4 Geo. 1. c. 7 Pr. | Reading and Basingstoke Road Act 1717; An Act for repairing the Highways from Crown Corner, in the Town of Reading, leading (by and through the several Parishes of Shinfield and Heckfield, in the several Counties of Berks, Wilts, and Southampton) to Basingstoke, in the said County of Southampton. |
| Reading to Puntfield Turnpike Trust | 1713 | 13 Ann. c. 28 | Berkshire Highways Act 1713; An Act for repairing the Highways between The Bear Inn in Reading, in the County of Berks, and a certain Place called Punt Field, in the said County. |
| Shillingford and Reading Turnpike Trust | 1764 | 4 Geo. 3. c. 42 | Shillingford Roads and Bridge Act 1764; An Act for repairing and widening the Road from Shillingford in the County of Oxford, through Wallingford and Pangborne, to Reading in the County of Berks; and for building a Bridge over the River Thames, at or near Shillingford Ferry. |
| Speenhamland to Marlborough Turnpike Trust | 1725 | 12 Geo. 1. c. 8 | Newbury to Marlborough Road Act 1725; An Act for repairing the Highways from Speenham Land, adjoining to Newbury, in the County of Berks, to Marlborough, in the County of Wilts. |
| Speenhamland to Reading Turnpike Trust | 1713 | 13 Ann. c. 28 | Berkshire Highways Act 1713; An Act for repairing the Highways between The Bear Inn in Reading, in the County of Berks, and a certain Place called Punt Field, in the said County. |
| Sunning-Lane End to Reading Turnpike Trust | 1735 | 9 Geo. 2. c. 21 | Berkshire Roads Act 1735; An Act for repairing the Highways from Sunning Lane End, next Twyford, to The Old Bear Inn, in Reading, in the County of Berks. |
| Theale Road Turnpike Trust | | | |
| Twyford Turnpike Trust | | | |
| Twyford and Theale Turnpike Trust | 1826 | 7 Geo. 4. c. lxxiii | Ruscombe, Reading and Beenham Road Act 1826; An Act for repairing the Road from the Thirty three Mile Stone in the Parish of Ruscombe in the County of Berks towards Reading, to a Place called The Seven Mile Stone in the Parish of Beenham in the same County, and a certain other Road communicating therewith. |
| Wallingford, Wantage and Faringdon Turnpike Trust | 1751 | 25 Geo. 2. c. 21 | Berkshire Roads Act 1751; An Act for repairing the Roads from Wallingford, in the County of Berks, to Wantage and from thence to Farringdon, and also from Wantage to Idson, in the said County. |

== Buckinghamshire ==
| Trust | Founded | Initial act | |
| Trust | Founded | Citation | Title |
|---|---|---|---|
| Aylesbury and Hockliffe Turnpike Trust | 1810 | 50 Geo. 3. c. xciv | Aylesbury and Hockliffe Road Act 1810; An Act for more effectually amending, widening and repairing the Road leading from Aylesbury, in the County of Buckingham, to Hockliffe, in the County of Bedford. |
| Aylesbury to West Wycombe Turnpike Trust; Princes Risborough to West Wycombe | 1795 | 35 Geo. 3. c. 149 | Aylesbury to West Wycombe Road Act 1795; An act for amending, widening, altering, improving, and keeping in repair, the road leading out of the turnpike road between Aylesbury and Wendover, through Princes Risborough, to West Wycombe, in the county of Buckingham. |
| Beaconsfield and Stokenchurch Turnpike Trust | 1718 | 5 Geo. 1. c. 2 Pr. | Beaconsfield and Stokenchurch Road Act 1718; An Act for repairing the Roads from Beconsfield, in the County of Bucks, to Stoken Church, in the County of Oxon. |
| Bicester and Aylesbury Turnpike Trust | 1770 | 10 Geo. 3. c. 72 | Bicester and Aylesbury Road Act 1770; An Act for repairing and widening the Road from Bicester, in the County of Oxford, to Aylesbury, in the County of Bucks. |
| Bromham and Olney Turnpike Trust | 1790 | 30 Geo. 3. c. 114 | Bedford and Buckinghamshire Roads Act 1790; An Act for amending, widening, and keeping in Repair the Road from the East End of Bromham Bridge, in the County of Bedford, to the Turnpike Road leading from Wellingborough to Olney, in the County of Bucks; and also the Road from the said Turnpike Road at or near the South End of the Town of Olney aforesaid to the Turnpike Road leading from Northampton to Newport Pagnell, in the same County. |
| Buckingham and Newport Pagnell Turnpike Trust | 1815 | 55 Geo. 3. c. lxxv | Road from Buckingham to Newport Pagnell Act 1815; An Act for repairing the Road from the Town of Buckingham to the Turnpike Road in the Hamlet of Old Stratford, and to be continued from the same Turnpike Road at the Town of Stony Stratford to the Town of Newport Pagnell, in the County of Bucks. |
| Buckingham and Towcester Turnpike Trust | 1824 | 5 Geo. 4. c. cxli | Road from Buckingham to Towcester Act 1824; An Act for repairing and amending the Road from the Town and Borough of Buckingham to the Oxford and Northampton Turnpike Road at Lord's Field Gate, near the Town of Towcester. |
| Buckingham and Hanwell Turnpike Trust | 1743 | 17 Geo. 2. c. 43 | Buckingham to Warmington Road Act 1743; An Act for repairing the Road from the Town of Buckingham, in the County of Bucks, to Warmington, in the County of Warwick. |
| Colnbrook Turnpike Trust; Colnbrook, Datchet and Slough Turnpike Trust | 1726 | 13 Geo. 1. c. 31 | Cranford to Maidenhead Road Act 1726; An Act for repairing the Road from Cranford Bridge, in the County of Middlesex, to that End of Maidenhead Bridge which lies in the County of Bucks. |
| Ellsborough to West Wycombe Turnpike Trust | | | |
| Great Marlow and Stokenchurch Turnpike Trust | 1791 | 31 Geo. 3. c. 135 | Great Marlow to Stokenchurch Road Act 1791; An Act for amending, widening, and keeping in Repair the Road from Great Marlow, in the County of Buckingham, to Stokenchurch in the County of Oxford. |
| Holyhead Road (Hockliffe Division) Turnpike Trust | 1706 | 6 Ann. c. 4 | Bedfordshire and Buckinghamshire Roads Act 1706; An Act for repairing the Highways between Fornhill, in the County of Bedford, and the Town of Stoney Stratford, in the County of Buckingham. |
| Princes Risborough and Thame Turnpike Trust | 1825 | 6 Geo. 4. c. xlv | Princes Risborough Roads Act 1825; An Act for more effectually repairing and improving certain Roads passing through Princes Risborough, in the County of Buckingham, and communicating with Aylesbury and Great Marlow in the said County, and Thame in the County of Oxford. |
| Red Hill and Beaconsfield Turnpike Trust | 1750 | 24 Geo. 2. c. 32 | Beaconsfield and Redhill Road Act 1750; An Act for enlarging the Term and Powers granted by Two Acts of Parliament, for repairing the Road from Wendover to the Town of Buckingham, in the County of Bucks, and also for repairing and widening the Road leading from the West End of the said Town of Wendover, to the End of a Lane called Oak Lane, next the Great Road called The Oxford Road, lying between the Town of Beconsfield, in the said County of Bucks, and Uxbridge, in the County of Middlesex, and that Part of the said great Road which leads from the West End of the said Town of Beconsfield to the River Colne, near Uxbridge aforesaid. |
| Wendover and Buckingham Turnpike Trust | 1720 | 7 Geo. 1. St. 1. c. 24 | Buckinghamshire Roads Act 1720; An Act for repairing the Road from Wendover to the Town of Buckingham, in the County of Bucks. |
| Wendover to Oak Lane Turnpike Trust | 1750 | 24 Geo. 2. c. 32 | Beaconsfield and Redhill Road Act 1750; An Act for enlarging the Term and Powers granted by Two Acts of Parliament, for repairing the Road from Wendover to the Town of Buckingham, in the County of Bucks, and also for repairing and widening the Road leading from the West End of the said Town of Wendover, to the End of a Lane called Oak Lane, next the Great Road called The Oxford Road, lying between the Town of Beconsfield, in the said County of Bucks, and Uxbridge, in the County of Middlesex, and that Part of the said great Road which leads from the West End of the said Town of Beconsfield to the River Colne, near Uxbridge aforesaid. |

== Hampshire ==
| Trust | Founded | Initial act | |
| Trust | Founded | Citation | Title |
|---|---|---|---|
| Aldermaston and Basingstoke Turnpike Trust | 1772 | 12 Geo. 3. c. 78 | Berkshire and Southampton Roads Act 1772; An Act for repairing and widening several Roads from Aldermaston, in the County of Berks, to Basingstoke, and from Aldermaston aforesaid to the Turnpike Road from Basingstoke to Andover, at or near Worting, and to the Turnpike Road leading to Winchester, at Popham Lane, in the County of Southampton. |
| Andover and Basingstoke Turnpike Trust | 1755 | 28 Geo. 2. c. 44 | Wiltshire Roads Act 1755; An Act for repairing and widening the Road from Basingstoke, through Wortin, Overton, Whitchurch, Hursborn Pryors, Andover, and Middle Wallop, in the County of Southampton, to a Place called Lobcomb Corner in the Parish of Winterslow in the County of Wilts. |
| Andover and Chilton Pond Turnpike Trust | 1766 | 6 Geo. 3. c. 86 | Hants and Berkshire Roads Act 1766; An Act for repairing and widening the Road from the present Turnpike Road in the Parish of Hursley in the County of Southampton, through the Borough of Andover, to the Town of Newbury in the County of Berks, and from Newbury to Chilton Pond and Newtown River. |
| Andover and Winchester (Andover District) Turnpike Trust | 1762 | 2 Geo. 3. c. 61 | Dorset, etc., Roads Act 1762; An Act for altering, widening, and amending, the Road from the North Gate of the City of Winchester, over Worthy Cow Down, through Whitchurch and other Places, to Newtown River, and also the Road from Worthy Cow Down aforesaid, through Wherwell, to the present Turnpike Road at Andover in the County of Southampton. |
| Andover Station Turnpike Trust | 1840 | 3 & 4 Vict. c. xxxi | Andover and Basingstoke Road Act 1840; An Act for more effectually repairing the road from Basingstoke in the county of Southampton to Lobcomb Corner in the county of Wilts, and other roads therein described; and for making a new road from the said road at the eastern entrance of the town of Andover to the Warren Farm Station on the London and South-western Railway, in the said county of Southampton. |
| Basingstoke, Odiham and Alton Turnpike Trust; Basingstoke, Hartfordbridge and Blackwater Turnpike Trust | 1736 | 10 Geo. 2. c. 12 | Southampton Roads Act 1736; An Act for repairing the Road from Hertford Bridge Hill, to the Town of Basingstoke; and also the Road from Hertford Bridge Hill aforesaid, to the Town of Odiham, in the County of Southampton. |
| Basingstoke, Preston Candover and Alton Turnpike Trust | 1795 | 35 Geo. 3. c. 138 | Preston Candover to Alton Road Act 1795; An Act for repairing and widening the road from Preston Candover to Basingstoke, in the county of Southampton, and from thence to Alton, in the said county. |
| Bishops Waltham and Fisher's Pond Turnpike Trust | 1833 | 3 & 4 Will. 4. c. xvii | Bishop's Waltham and Owlesbury Road (Hampshire) Act 1833 |
| Botley Turnpike Trust | 1765 | 5 Geo. 3. c. 95 | Hants Roads Act 1765; An Act for repairing and widening the Road leading from a Street called The Hundred at Romsey, through Chilworth, to the River at Swathling in the County of Southampton; and for connecting the same with the Road leading from the City of Winchester, through Hursley, to Chandler's Ford; and from Hursley aforesaid to the Turnpike Road at Romsey aforesaid; and also for repairing and widening the Road leading from the River at Swathling aforesaid, through Botley, to the Turnpike Road at Sherril Heath in the said County of Southampton. |
| Christchurch and Lyndhurst Turnpike Trust | 1841 | 4 & 5 Vict. c. xxii | Christchurch and Lyndhurst Road Act 1841; An Act for more effectually repairing the Road from the Western Side of the New Forest near Christchurch to the Boundary of the Parish of Lyndhurst, all in the County of Hants. |
| Cranbourne Chase and New Forest Turnpike Trust | 1832 | 2 & 3 Will. 4. c. lxiv | Cann St. Rumbold and Brook Turnpike Road (Dorset, Hampshire) Act 1832; An Act for making a Turnpike Road from the Parish of Cann Saint Bumbold, near Shaftesbury in the County of Dorset, through Cranbourne Chase and the New Forest, to the Bell Inn at Brook in the Parish of Bramshaw in the County of Southampton, together with Two Branches therefrom. |
| Farnham and Petersfield Turnpike Trust | 1826 | 7 Geo. 4. c. lxxx | Farnham and Petersfield Turnpike Road Act 1826; An Act for making and maintaining a Turnpike Road from a Place called Coxbridge, near Farnham in the County of Surrey, to Ramshill near Petersfield in the County of Southampton. |
| Gosport and Bishops Waltham, Wickham and Chawton Turnpike Trust | 1757 | 31 Geo. 2. c. 73 | Hampshire Roads Act 1757; An Act for repairing and widening the Roads from Chawton Pond in the Parish of Chawton in the County of Southampton, through Rumsdean Bottom, Westmeon, Warnford, Exton, Bishop's Waltham, and over Sherrill Heath, and through Wickham and Fareham, to the Town of Gosport, and from Exton aforesaid, through Droxford, to the East End of Sherrill Heath in the said County. |
| Isle of Wight Highways Turnpike Trust | 1813 | 53 Geo. 3. c. xcii | Isle of Wight Highway Act 1813; An Act for amending the Roads and Highways in the Isle of Wight. |
| London and Southampton Turnpike Trust; London and Southampton through Bishops Waltham Turnpike Trust | 1801 | 41 Geo. 3. (U.K.) c. viii | Road from the Botley Turnpike Road Act 1801; An act for making and maintaining a convenient carriage road from the Botley turnpike road, on Curdridge Common, in the parish of Bishops Waltham, to join the Gosport turnpike road, at or near Filmerhill, in the parish of Westmeon, with a branch from the said road, on Corhampton Down, to the village of Corhampton, all in the county of Southampton. |
| Lower St Cross, Mill Lane to Park Gate Turnpike Trust | 1810 | 50 Geo. 3. c. xxii | Road from the Winchester and Southampton Road Act 1810; An Act for making and maintaining a Road from Lower Saint Cross Mill Lane, (on the Road from the City of Winchester to the Town of Southampton) to Park Gate, on the Road from Southampton to Gosport, in the County of Southampton. |
| Lymington, Lyndhurst and Rumbridge Turnpike Trust | 1765 | 5 Geo. 3. c. 59 | Lymington Roads Act 1765; An Act for repairing and widening several Roads leading from the Quay at Lymington, in the County of Southampton. |
| Odiham and Alton Turnpike Trust | 1793 | 33 Geo. 3. c. 182 | Odiham to Alton Road Act 1793; An Act for repairing and widening the Road from Odiham to Alton, in the County of Southampton. |
| Odiham and Farnham Turnpike Trust | 1789 | 29 Geo. 3. c. 89 | Odiham to Farnham Roads Act 1789; An Act for repairing and widening the Road from Odiham in the County of Southampton, to Farnham in the County of Surrey. |
| Petersfield to near Ropley Turnpike Trust | 1825 | 6 Geo. 4. c. lxxxvii | Sheetbridge and Portsmouth Roads Act 1825; An Act for more effectually repairing and improving the Roads from Sheet Bridge to Portsmouth, and from Petersfield to the Alton and Alresford Turnpike Road, near Ropley, in the County of Southampton; and for making and maintaining a new Branch of Road to communicate therewith. |
| Popham Lane to Winchester Turnpike Trust | 1758 | 32 Geo. 2. c. 50 | Dorset Roads Act 1758; An Act for repairing and widening the Roads from Oxdown Gate in Popham Lane to the City of Winchester, and from the said City, through Hursley, to Chandlers Ford, and from Hursley aforesaid to the Turnpike Road at Romsey, and from the said Turnpike Road, through Ringwood in the County of Southampton, to Longham Bridge and Winborne Minster in the County of Dorset. |
| Portsmouth and Sheet Bridge Turnpike Trust | 1710 | 9 Ann. c. 33 | Petersfield Highways Act 1710; An Act for repairing the Highways from Sheet Bridge, in the Parish of Petersfield, to the Town of Portsmouth, in the County of Southampton. |
| Ringwood, Longham and Leigh Turnpike Trust | 1758 | 32 Geo. 2. c. 50 | Dorset Roads Act 1758; An Act for repairing and widening the Roads from Oxdown Gate in Popham Lane to the City of Winchester, and from the said City, through Hursley, to Chandlers Ford, and from Hursley aforesaid to the Turnpike Road at Romsey, and from the said Turnpike Road, through Ringwood in the County of Southampton, to Longham Bridge and Winborne Minster in the County of Dorset. |
| Romsey and Ringwood Turnpike Trust | 1758 | 32 Geo. 2. c. 50 | Dorset Roads Act 1758; An Act for repairing and widening the Roads from Oxdown Gate in Popham Lane to the City of Winchester, and from the said City, through Hursley, to Chandlers Ford, and from Hursley aforesaid to the Turnpike Road at Romsey, and from the said Turnpike Road, through Ringwood in the County of Southampton, to Longham Bridge and Winborne Minster in the County of Dorset. |
| Romsey, Broughton, Stockbridge and Wallop Turnpike Trust | 1764 | 4 Geo. 3. c. 47 | Wiltshire and Hampshire Roads Act 1764; An Act for repairing and widening the Roads from the End of Stanbridge Lane near a Barn in the Parish of Romsey to the Turnpike Road at Middle Wallop, and from the Turnpike Road between Stanbridge Lane aforesaid and Great Bridge to the Turnpike Road at Stockbridge, and from the Garden of Henry Hattat at Awbridge to the Garden Wall of Denys Rolle Esquire at East Tuderley, and from Lockerley Mill Stream to East Dean Gate, and from the said Garden Wall to the Turnpike Road leading from Stockbridge aforesaid, in the County of Southampton, to Salisbury. |
| Southampton Turnpike Trust | 1757 | 31 Geo. 2. c. 75 | Stockbridge and Winchester Roads Act 1757; An Act for repairing and widening the Roads from the Town of Stockbridge in the County of Southampton, to the City of Winchester; and from the said City, through Bellmour Lane, to the Top of Steven's Castle Down near the Town of Bishop's Waltham in the said County; and from the said City of Winchester, through Otterborne, to Bar Gate in the Town and County of the Town of Southampton. |
| Stockbridge and Basingstoke Turnpike Trust | 1756 | 29 Geo. 2. c. 46 | Stockbridge Roads Act 1756; An Act for repairing and widening the High Roads from Basingstoke, through Popham Lane, Sutton, Scotney, and Stockbridge, in the County of Southampton, to a Place called Lodcomb Corner in the County of Wilts; and also for repairing and widening the Road from Spittlehouse, over Weyhill, to Mullen's Pond in the said County of Southampton. |
| Stockbridge and Winchester Turnpike Trust | 1757 | 31 Geo. 2. c. 75 | Stockbridge and Winchester Roads Act 1757; An Act for repairing and widening the Roads from the Town of Stockbridge in the County of Southampton, to the City of Winchester; and from the said City, through Bellmour Lane, to the Top of Steven's Castle Down near the Town of Bishop's Waltham in the said County; and from the said City of Winchester, through Otterborne, to Bar Gate in the Town and County of the Town of Southampton. |
| Titchfield and Cosham Turnpike Trust | 1810 | 50 Geo. 3. c. xiv | Titchfield and Cosham Road Act 1810; An Act for repairing, altering and improving the Road from Titchfield to Cosham, in the County of Southampton. |
| Whitchurch and Aldermaston Turnpike Trust | 1770 | 10 Geo. 3. c. 88 | Whitchurch to Aldermaston Road Act 1770; An Act for repairing and widening the Road from Whitchurch, in the County of Southampton, to the Turnpike Road at Aldermaston Great Bridge, in the County of Berks. |
| Whiteparish, Romsey and Southampton Turnpike Trust | 1756 | 29 Geo. 2. c. 45 | Wiltshire and Southampton Roads Act 1756; An Act for repairing and widening the Roads leading from a Pond belonging to Henry Eyre Esquire, in the Parish of White Parish in the County of Wilts, to the Top of Dunwood Hill, and from thence, over Great-bridge and Middle-bridge, through Romseyinfra, to Hundred-bridge in the County of Southampton, and from thence to the County of the Town of Southampton. |
| Winchester and Alton (Lower District) Turnpike Trust | 1753 | 26 Geo. 2. c. 51 | Surrey and Southampton Roads Act 1753; An Act for repairing and widening the Roads leading from a Place called Basing-stone, near the Town of Bagshot, in the Parish of Windlesham, in the County of Surry, through Frimley and Farnham, in the same County; and from thence, through Bentley, Hollyborn, Alton, Chawton, Ropley, Bishops Sutton, New Alresford, and Mattingley otherwise Matterley Lane, to the City of Winchester, in the County of Southampton. |
| Winchester and Gosport Turnpike Trust | | | |
| Winchester and Romsey Turnpike Trust; Romsey and Winchester Turnpike Trust | 1758 | 32 Geo. 2. c. 50 | Dorset Roads Act 1758; An Act for repairing and widening the Roads from Oxdown Gate in Popham Lane to the City of Winchester, and from the said City, through Hursley, to Chandlers Ford, and from Hursley aforesaid to the Turnpike Road at Romsey, and from the said Turnpike Road, through Ringwood in the County of Southampton, to Longham Bridge and Winborne Minster in the County of Dorset. |
| Winchester and Waltham Turnpike Trust | 1757 | 31 Geo. 2. c. 75 | Stockbridge and Winchester Roads Act 1757; An Act for repairing and widening the Roads from the Town of Stockbridge in the County of Southampton, to the City of Winchester; and from the said City, through Bellmour Lane, to the Top of Steven's Castle Down near the Town of Bishop's Waltham in the said County; and from the said City of Winchester, through Otterborne, to Bar Gate in the Town and County of the Town of Southampton. |
| Winchester to Newtown River Turnpike Trust; Winchester, Newtown River and Andover Turnpike Trust | 1762 | 2 Geo. 3. c. 61 | Dorset, etc., Roads Act 1762; An Act for altering, widening, and amending, the Road from the North Gate of the City of Winchester, over Worthy Cow Down, through Whitchurch and other Places, to Newtown River, and also the Road from Worthy Cow Down aforesaid, through Wherwell, to the present Turnpike Road at Andover in the County of Southampton. |
| Winchester to Petersfield Turnpike Trust | 1825 | 6 Geo. 4. c. xiv | Winchester and Petersfield Turnpike Road Act 1825; An Act for making and maintaining a Turnpike Road from the City of Winchester to the Town of Petersfield, in the County of Southampton. |
| Winchester (Upper District) (Bagshot to Farnham) Turnpike Trust | 1753 | 26 Geo. 2. c. 51 | Surrey and Southampton Roads Act 1753; An Act for repairing and widening the Roads leading from a Place called Basing-stone, near the Town of Bagshot, in the Parish of Windlesham, in the County of Surry, through Frimley and Farnham, in the same County; and from thence, through Bentley, Hollyborn, Alton, Chawton, Ropley, Bishops Sutton, New Alresford, and Mattingley otherwise Matterley Lane, to the City of Winchester, in the County of Southampton. |

== Kent ==
| Trust | Founded | Initial act | |
| Trust | Founded | Citation | Title |
|---|---|---|---|
| Ashford and Ham Street Turnpike Trust | 1793 | 33 Geo. 3. c. 162 | Kent Roads Act 1793; An Act for amending, improving, and keeping in Repair the Road from the North End of Marsh Lane, in Ashford, in the County of Kent, to the End of the Parish of Orlestone, near Stockbridge, in Romney Marsh, in the said County. |
| Ashford and Maidstone Turnpike Trust | 1793 | 33 Geo. 3. c. 173 | Maidstone to Ashford Road Act 1793; An Act for amending, widening, shortening, improving, and keeping in Repair the Road from Wren's Cross, in the Town of Maidstone, in the County of Kent, through the West or Lower Harrietsham-street, by Harrietsham Church, and through Lenham and Charing to Barrow Hill, in Ashford, in the said County. |
| Ashford to Orlestone Turnpike Trust | | | |
| Ashford to Tenderton Turnpike Trust | | | |
| Benenden Turnpike Trust | 1769 | 9 Geo. 3. c. 43 | Kent Roads Act 1769; An Act for repairing and widening the Roads from the Turnpike Road at Golford Green, in the Parish of Cranbrooke, to the Turnpike Road in the Parish of Sandhurst, and from the Green near Benenden Church to the Bull Inn at Rolvenden Cross, in the County of Kent. |
| Bethersden Turnpike Trust | 1767 | 7 Geo. 3. c. 103 | Tenterden &c. Road Act 1766; An Act for repairing and widening, the Road leading from the Turnpike Road in the Town of Tenterden to and over Bull Green, and to and through the Town of Great Chart, to a House known by the Sign of The Castle, at the Entrance of the Town of Ashford, in the County of Kent, and also the Road leading from Bull Green aforesaid to Hotfield Heath, and also the Road leading from Bull Green aforesaid, through High Halden, to Dashmanden, in the Parish of Biddenden, in the said County of Kent. |
| Biddenden Turnpike Trust | 1762 | 2 Geo. 3. c. 65 | Kent Roads Act 1762; An Act for repairing and widening the Roads from the White Post on Haselden's Wood in the Parish of Cranbrooke to Appledore Heath, and from Milk House Street in the same Parish to Castleden's Oak in the Parish of Biddenden, and from Golford Green in the said Parish of Cranbrooke to Tanner's Vent in the Parish of Benenden, all in the County of Kent. |
| Biddenden to Boundgate Turnpike Trust | 1766 | 6 Geo. 3. c. 93 | Biddenden and Boundgate Road Act 1766; An Act for amending and widening the Road from the Town of Biddenden in The Weald of Kent, through the Towns of Smarden and Charing, to join the Turnpike Road which leads from Ashford to Feversham, at a Place called Bound Gate. |
| Brandbridges Turnpike Trust | 1767 | 7 Geo. 3. c. 91 | Kent Roads Act 1766; An Act for repairing and widening the Road from the Brick Kilns on East Malling Heath to the Turnpike Road on Pembury Green, and from Brand Bridges to The Four Wents near Matfield Green, in the County of Kent. |
| Bromley to Farnborough Turnpike Trust | | | |
| Canterbury and Barnham Turnpike Trust | 1791 | 31 Geo. 3. c. 94 | Kent Roads Act 1791; An Act for making a new Road from Saint George's Gate, in the City of Canterbury, to a Place called Gutteridge Bottom; and for repairing and widening the present Road from thence to the Dover Turnpike Road in the Parish of Barham, in the County of Kent. |
| Canterbury and Ramsgate Turnpike Trust | 1802 | 42 Geo. 3. c. v | Road from Canterbury to Ramsgate Act 1802; An Act for repairing, altering, widening and improving the Road leading from the City of Canterbury to the Town of Ramsgate, in the Isle of Thanet, in the County of Kent; and for suspending and varying, for a limited Time, so much of an Act, passed in the Twenty seventh Year of the Reign of His present Majesty, as relates to the Toll Gate, and to the Tolls now payable by virtue of the said Act, on the Road leading from the said City of Canterbury to the Isle of Thanet. |
| Canterbury and Sandwich Turnpike Trust | 1802 | 42 Geo. 3. c. vi | Road from Canterbury to Sandwich Act 1802; An Act for repairing, altering, widening and improving the Road leading from the City of Canterbury to the Town and Port of Sandwich, in the County of Kent. |
| Chatham and Canterbury Turnpike Trust | 1729 | 3 Geo. 2. c. 15 | Kent Roads Act 1729; An Act for repairing and widening the Road from that Part of Chatham which lies next to the City of Rochester, to St. Dunstan's Cross, near the City of Canterbury, in the County of Kent; and for repealing so much of a former Act as appropriates Part of the Money arising by the Tolls or Duties therein mentioned towards repairing the Road between the Town of Chatham and Boughton under the Blean, in the said County of Kent. |
| Cranbrooke to Sandhurst Turnpike Trust | | | |
| Dartford and Sevenoaks Turnpike Trust | 1766 | 6 Geo. 3. c. 98 | Dartford Roads Act 1766; An Act for repairing and widening several Roads leading to the Town of Dartford, in the County of Kent. |
| Dartford and Strood Turnpike Trust | 1737 | 11 Geo. 2. c. 37 | Kent Roads Act 1737; An Act for enlarging the Term and Powers granted in and by an Act, made in the Tenth Year of Her late Majesty Queen Anne, for enlarging, amending, and maintaining, the Road between Northfleet, Gravesend, and Rochester, in the County of Kent; and also another Act, made in the Eleventh Year of His late Majesty King George the First, for enlarging the Term granted by the said former Act; and for other Purposes therein mentioned; and for explaining and amending the said Acts; and also for repairing the Highway from Northfleet aforesaid to Dartford, in the said County. |
| Dover and Sandgate Turnpike Trust | 1764 | 4 Geo. 3. c. 78 | Kent Roads Act 1764; An Act for explaining and amending an Act made in the Twenty-sixth Year of the Reign of His late Majesty King George the Second, intituled, "An Act for amending, widening, and repairing, the Road leading from Dover to Barham Downs, in the County of Kent;" and also for amending, widening, and repairing, the Road leading from Cowgate and Archcliffe Fort in Dover, through Folkstone, to the Town of Hythe in the said County. |
| Dover, Deal and Sandwich Turnpike Trust; Dover to Sandwich, through Deal Turnpike Trust | 1797 | 37 Geo. 3. c. 156 | Dover Deal and Sandwich Road Act 1797; An Act for repairing and widening the road, leading from the town and port of Dover, through the town and borough of Deal, to a certain place in the parish of Sholden, called Foulmead Field; and for making a new road through part of the said field, and Hacklinge Brooks, and part of a certain other field, called Word Field, to or near to a messuage or farm house, called Upton Farm, in the parish of Worth otherwise Word; and for repairing and widening the road from thence to the town and port of Sandwich. |
| Dover, Walfdershare and Sandwich Turnpike Trust; Dover to Sandwich, through Waldershare Turnpike Trust | 1801 | 41 Geo. 3. (U.K.) c. xi | Dover and Sandwich Road Act 1801; An act for altering, widening, and repairing the road leading from the town and port of Dover to the town and port of Sandwich, through the parish of Waldershare, and also the road from the present turnpike road leading from Dover to Barham downs, up Kersney Court hill, to the parish of Whitfield otherwise Beausfield, in the county of Kent. |
| Dover to Barham Downs Turnpike Trust | 1753 | 26 Geo. 2. c. 68 | Kent Roads Act 1753; An Act for amending, widening, and repairing, the Road leading from Dover to Barham Downs, in the County of Kent. |
| East Malling to Pembury Green Turnpike Trust | | | |
| Faversham to Hythe and Canterbury Turnpike Trust; Faversham, Hythe and Canterbury Turnpike Trust | 1762 | 2 Geo. 3. c. 76 | Kent Roads (No. 2) Act 1762; An Act for amending and widening the Road leading to the High Post Road near the Town of Faversham, by Bacon's Water, through Ashford, to the Town and Port of Hythe in the County of Kent, and from Bacon's Water to a certain Lane called Holy Lane in Wincheap near the City of Canterbury. |
| Folkestone and Barham Turnpike Trust | 1792 | 32 Geo. 3. c. 117 | Kent Roads Act 1792; An Act for repairing and widening the Road leading out of the Turnpike Road from Dover, through Folkestone to Hythe, at a certain Place called Canterbury Lane, within the Liberty of the Town of Folkestone, to a certain Place in the Parish of Folkestone called Mudshole; and for making a new Road from thence, through a certain Field called Yaldergates, through Rainden Wood over Swingfield Minnis, through Denton; and for repairing and widening the Road from thence to the Direction Post on Barham Downs, in the Parish of Barham, at the Four Vents. |
| Goudhurst Turnpike Trust | 1768 | 8 Geo. 3. c. 35 | Goudhurst Roads Act 1768; An Act for amending, widening, and keeping in Repair, several Roads leading to and through the Town of Goudhurst in the County of Kent. |
| Goudhurst, Gore and Stilebridge Turnpike Trust | 1765 | 5 Geo. 3. c. 63 | Kent Roads Act 1765; An Act for repairing and widening the Roads leading from the Turnpike Road at Kipping's Cross in the Parish of Brenchley in the County of Kent, through the Parishes of Brenchley, Horsmonsden, and Goudhurst, by the Left Hand Side of Iden Green, to the Turnpike Road on Wilsley Green in the Parish of Cranbrooke; and from a Place near Goudhurst Gore, through the Parish of Marden, to Stile Bridge in the said Parish; and from Underden Green in Marden aforesaid to Wanshutts Green in the County of Kent. |
| Gravesend and Wrotham Turnpike Trust | 1825 | 6 Geo. 4. c. l | Road from Gravesend to Wrotham Act 1825; An Act for making and maintaining a Turnpike Road from the Town of Gravesend to Wrotham, in the County of Kent, and from thence to Borough Green on the Turnpike Road leading from Wrotham Heath to Ightham, in the said County. |
| Greenwich and Woolwich Lower Road Turnpike Trust | 1818 | 58 Geo. 3. c. lxxviii | Road from Greenwich to Woolwich Act 1818; An Act for repairing, widening and improving the Lower Road leading from the Town of Greenwich to the Town of Woolwich, in the County of Kent. |
| Herne Bay Turnpike Trust | 1814 | 54 Geo. 3. c. li | Sturry and Herne Bay Road Act 1814; An Act for amending, widening and keeping in Repair the Road leading from Sturry Street to Herne Bay, in the County of Kent. |
| Ightham Turnpike Trust | 1811 | 51 Geo. 3. c. clvii | Ightham and London to Maidstone Road Act 1811; An Act for making and maintaining a Road from Ightham, in the County of Kent, to the Turnpike Road leading from London to Maidstone, in the said County. |
| Kippings Cross and Flimwell Vent Turnpike Trust; Kipping's Cross and Flimwell Turnpike Trust | 1762 | 2 Geo. 3. c. 67 | Kent and Sussex Roads Act 1762; An Act for continuing, enlarging, and rendering more effectual, so much of an Act, made in the Fourteenth Year of the Reign of His late Majesty King George the Second, intituled, "An Act for enlarging the Terms and Powers granted by Two Acts of Parliament, for repairing the Roads leading from Seven Oaks to Woodsgate and Tonbridge Wells, and from Woodsgate to Kipping's Cross, in the County of Kent; and also for repairing the Roads from Kipping's Cross aforesaid to Lamberhurst Pound and Pullen's Hill in the said County, and to Flimwell Vent in the County of Sussex," as relates to the amending, repairing, and keeping in Repair, the said Roads leading from Kipping's Cross aforesaid, to Lamberhurst Pound, Pullen's Hill, and Flimwell Vent aforesaid. |
| Kippings Cross and Willsley Pond Turnpike Trust; Kipping's Cross and Willsley Turnpike Trust | 1765 | 5 Geo. 3. c. 63 | Kent Roads Act 1765; An Act for repairing and widening the Roads leading from the Turnpike Road at Kipping's Cross in the Parish of Brenchley in the County of Kent, through the Parishes of Brenchley, Horsmonsden, and Goudhurst, by the Left Hand Side of Iden Green, to the Turnpike Road on Wilsley Green in the Parish of Cranbrooke; and from a Place near Goudhurst Gore, through the Parish of Marden, to Stile Bridge in the said Parish; and from Underden Green in Marden aforesaid to Wanshutts Green in the County of Kent. |
| Maidstone and Biddenden Turnpike Trust | 1803 | 43 Geo. 3. c. xiii | Road from the Maidstone Turnpike Gate Act 1803; An Act for repairing, altering, widening, and improving the Road leading from the Maidstone Turnpike Gate, situate on the Loose Road near Sutton Lane, in the Parish of Maidstone, to The King's Head Inn in Sutton Valence, in the County of Kent. |
| Maidstone and Cranbrook Turnpike Trust | 1759 | 33 Geo. 2. c. 57 | Maidstone to Cranbrook Road Act 1759; An Act for the amending, widening, and keeping in Repair, the Road leading from the Thirty-nine Mile Stone at the Upper End of Stone Street in the Town of Maidstone in the County of Kent, to a certain Place called Tubb's Lake in the Parish of Cranbrooke in the said County. |
| Maidstone and Key Street Turnpike Trust | 1769 | 9 Geo. 3. c. 78 | Maidstone to Key Street Road Act 1769; An Act for repairing and widening the Road from Maidstone, through Debtling, to Key Street, in the Parishes of Borden and Bobbing, in the County of Kent. |
| Malling and Strood Turnpike Trust | 1825 | 6 Geo. 4. c. xxv | Maidstone and Wrotham and Strood Turnpike Road Act 1825; An Act for making and maintaining a Turnpike Road from the present Turnpike Road, between Maidstone and Wrotham, in the County of Kent, to Strood in the said County. |
| New Cross Turnpike Trust | 1717 | 4 Geo. 1. c. 5 Pr. | Southwark, Greenwich and Lewisham Roads Act 1717; An Act for reparing the Highways leading from The Stone's-end of Kent Street, in the Parish of St. George's Southwark, in the County of Surrey, to the Lime Kilns, in East Greenwich, near Blackheath, and to Lewisham Church, being the Tunbridge Road, in the County of Kent. |
| Penshurst, Wat's Cross and Cowden Turnpike Trust | 1765 | 5 Geo. 3. c. 71 | Kent Roads (No. 2) Act 1765; An Act for repairing and widening the Road from Tonbridge to Maidstone, and from Watt's Cross to Cowden, in the County of Kent. |
| Rochester and Maidstone Turnpike Trust | 1727 | 1 Geo. 2. St. 1. c. 12 | Rochester to Maidstone Road Act 1727; An Act for repairing and enlarging the Road leading from the House called The Sign of the Bells, in the Parish of St. Margaret in Rochester, to Maidstone, and other Roads therein mentioned, in the County of Kent. |
| Rolvenden Turnpike Trust | 1769 | 9 Geo. 3. c. 76 | Kent Roads (No. 3) Act 1769; An Act to repeal so much of an Act, passed in the Second Year of His present Majesty, for repairing and widening the Roads from the White Post on Haselden's Wood, in the Parish of Cranbrooke to Appledore Heathy and other Roads in the, County of Kent, as relates to the Road front Goldford Green to Tanner's Vent; for enlarging the Term and Powers of the said Act with respect to the other Roads therein contained; and for amending, the Road from the Turnpike Road, in the tariffs of Tenterden, through Rolvenden, to the Turnpike Road in the Parish of Newenden, in the said County. |
| Sandwich, Margate and Ramsgate Turnpike Trust | 1807 | 47 Geo. 3 Sess. 1. c. xxii | Sandwich, Margate and Ramsgate Road Act 1807; An Act for amending, altering, widening, and keeping in Repair, the Road from the Town and Port of Sandwich, in the County of Kent, to the respective Towns of Margate and Ramsgate, in the Isle of Thanet, in the said County; and for reducing, for a limited Time, the Tolls and Duties now payable at Sandwich Bridge, by virtue of an Act, passed in the Twenty-eighth Year of His late Majesty. |
| Sevenoaks Turnpike Trust; Farnborough to Severnoaks Turnpike Trust | 1748 | 22 Geo. 2. c. 4 | Farnborough and Sevenoaks Road Act 1748; An Act for repairing and widening the Road leading from the Well at the North West End of the Town or Village of Farnborough,[a] in the County of Kent, to a Place called Riverhill, in the Parish of Sevenoaks, in the said County. |
| Shoreham to Chelsfield Turnpike Trust | 1810 | 50 Geo. 3. c. xviii | Shoreham (Kent) Road Act 1810; An Act for repairing the Road leading from the Eynsford Turnpike Road in the Parish of Shoreham, in the County of Kent, to the Turnpike Road leading from Sevenoaks to Bromley, in the said County. |
| Snodland to Strood Turnpike Trust | | | |
| Stokershead to Bagham's Cross Turnpike Trust; Stockerhead to Chilham Turnpike Trust | 1809 | 49 Geo. 3. c. xcii | Stockershead Road (Kent) Act 1809; An Act for amending and improving the Road from Stockershead at the Top of Charing Hill, to a certain Place where the same joins the Road from Ashford to Canterbury, all in the County of Kent. |
| Tenterden Turnpike Trust | 1762 | 2 Geo. 3. c. 65 | Kent Roads Act 1762; An Act for repairing and widening the Roads from the White Post on Haselden's Wood in the Parish of Cranbrooke to Appledore Heath, and from Milk House Street in the same Parish to Castleden's Oak in the Parish of Biddenden, and from Golford Green in the said Parish of Cranbrooke to Tanner's Vent in the Parish of Benenden, all in the County of Kent. |
| Tenterden to Warehorne Turnpike Trust | | | |
| Tonbridge Turnpike Trust | 1709 | 8 Ann. c. 20 | Sevenoaks and Tunbridge Highways Act 1709; An Act for repairing and amending the Highways leading from Seven Oakes to Woods-gate and Tunbridge Wells, in the County of Kent. |
| Tonbridge and Ightham Turnpike Trust | 1809 | 49 Geo. 3. c. xci | Tonbridge and Ightham Road Act 1809; An Act for amending and improving the Road from the North End of the Town of Tonbridge to the Village of Ightham, and Two other Roads communicating with the same, all in the County of Kent. |
| Tonbridge and Maidstone Turnpike Trust | 1765 | 5 Geo. 3. c. 71 | Kent Roads (No. 2) Act 1765; An Act for repairing and widening the Road from Tonbridge to Maidstone, and from Watt's Cross to Cowden, in the County of Kent. |
| Tunbridge Wells to Uckfield Turnpike Trust | | | |
| Wadhurst and West Farleigh Turnpike Trust | 1765 | 5 Geo. 3. c. 52 | Sussex and Kent Roads Act 1765; An Act for repairing and widening the Road leading from the Town of Wadhurst in the County of Sussex, to the Turnpike Road at Lamberhurst Pound and Pullen's Hill in the County of Kent, and from the Top of Pullen's Hill, through the Parishes of Horsmonden, Marden, Yalden, and West Farley, to West Farley Street in the said County of Kent. |
| West Peckham to Hadlow Turnpike Trust | | | |
| Westerham and Edenbridge Turnpike Trust | 1767 | 7 Geo. 3. c. 86 | Kent and Sussex Roads (No. 2) Act 1766; An Act for repairing, widening, and keeping in Repair, the Road leading from the High Road between Bromley and Farnborough in the County of Kent, to Beggar’s Bush in the Turnpike Road leading from Tunbridge Wells to Maresfield, in the County of Sussex. |
| Westerham to Titsey Turnpike Trust | | | |
| Whistable Turnpike Trust | 1735 | 9 Geo. 2. c. 10 | Kent Roads (No. 2) Act 1735; An Act for repairing and widening the Road leading from Saint Dunstan's Cross, near the City of Canterbury, to the Water-side at Whitstable, in the County of Kent. |
| Woodchurch Turnpike Trust | 1820 | 1 Geo. 4. c. xlvi | Tenterden and Warehorne, and Bethersden and Appledore Roads Act 1820; An Act for widening and improving the Road leading from the Turnpike Road in the Town of Tenterden, through Woodchurch to Warehorne, and the Road leading out of the Turnpike Road in the Parish of Bethersden, through Woodchurch to Appledore, in the County of Kent. |
| Wrotham and Maidstone Turnpike Trust | 1751 | 25 Geo. 2. c. 8 | Kent Roads Act 1751; An Act for repairing the Road leading from The Royal Oak on Wrotham Heath, to the Town of Wrotham, in the County of Kent, and from thence to the Village of Foot's Cray, in the said County. |
| Wrotham Heath Turnpike Trust | 1765 | 5 Geo. 3. c. 68 | Kent and Surrey Roads Act 1765; An Act for repairing, widening, and keeping in Repair, the Road leading from the Turnpike Road at Wrotham Heath in the County of Kent, to the Turnpike Road leading from Croydon to Godstone in the County of Surrey. |

== Middlesex ==
| Trust | Founded | Initial act | |
| Trust | Founded | Citation | Title |
|---|---|---|---|
| Bethnal Green to Church Street Turnpike Trust | | | |
| Brompton to Fulham Road Turnpike Trust | 1825 | 6 Geo. 4. c. clx | Earls Court and North End Turnpike Road and Junction with London and Fulham Road Act 1825; An Act for making and maintaining a Turnpike Road from Brompton and Earles Court, in the Parish of Saint Mary Abbott's, Kensington, in the County of Middlesex, to communicate with the Road called Fulham Fields Road at North End, in the same County; and for making another Turnpike Road to communicate therewith from the High Road from London to Fulham, in the said County. |
| Camden Town to Holloway Turnpike Trust | 1824 | 5 Geo. 4. c. cxxxviii | Road from Camden Town to Holloway Act 1824; An Act for making and maintaining a Road from the Hampstead Road in Camden Town, to the North Road at Holloway in the Parish of Saint Mary Islington in the County of Middlesex. |
| Cannon Street Turnpike Trust | 1754 | 27 Geo. 2. c. 40 | Ratcliff Highway Act 1754; An Act for opening, making, widening, and keeping in Repair, a Road from Ratcliff Highway, through Cannon Street, in the County of Middlesex, into the Road leading into the County of Essex; and also from the West End of Brook Street into Cable Street, and from Upper Shadwell Street into the Back Lane in the said County of Middlesex. |
| Commercial Road Turnpike Trust | 1802 | 42 Geo. 3. c. ci | Roads from West India Docks Act 1802; An Act for making and maintaining, and for watching, lighting, and watering a Road from the West India Docks, in the Isle of Dogs, to communicate with a Street called Church Lane or Church Street, Whitechapel; and for making and maintaining a Branch of Road therefrom, to communicate with Queen Street, in the Parish of Saint Anne, all in the County of Middlesex; for opening, widening, and improving certain Streets and Passages therein mentioned, and for more effectually amending and keeping in Repair, a Road from Ratcliffe Highway through Cannon Street, in the County of Middlesex, into the Road leading into the County of Essex, and also from the West End of Brook Street into Cable Street, and from Upper Shadwell Street into the Back Lane, in the said County of Middlesex. |
| Earls Court to Hammersmith Bridge Turnpike Trust | 1828 | 9 Geo. 4. c. ciii | North End and Hammersmith Bridge Turnpike Road Act 1828; An Act for making and maintaining a Turnpike Road from North End to Hammersmith Bridge, both in the County of Middlesex. |
| East India Docks Road Turnpike Trust | 1802 | 42 Geo. 3. c. ci | Roads from West India Docks Act 1802; An Act for making and maintaining, and for watching, lighting, and watering a Road from the West India Docks, in the Isle of Dogs, to communicate with a Street called Church Lane or Church Street, Whitechapel; and for making and maintaining a Branch of Road therefrom, to communicate with Queen Street, in the Parish of Saint Anne, all in the County of Middlesex; for opening, widening, and improving certain Streets and Passages therein mentioned, and for more effectually amending and keeping in Repair, a Road from Ratcliffe Highway through Cannon Street, in the County of Middlesex, into the Road leading into the County of Essex, and also from the West End of Brook Street into Cable Street, and from Upper Shadwell Street into the Back Lane, in the said County of Middlesex. |
| Islington Old Street Turnpike Trust | 1753 | 26 Geo. 2. c. 87 | Old Street Road Act 1753; An Act for repairing and widening the Road from The Stones End near Shoreditch Church to the Center of the Bridge in Old Street Road, and through Old Street, in the Parish of Saint Luke, Middlesex, to the West End of the said Street next the Pavement in Goswell Street. |
| Jeremy's Ferry to Snaresbrook Turnpike Trust | 1757 | 30 Geo. 2. c. 59 | River Lea Bridge and Roads Act 1757; An Act for building a Bridge over the River Lea, at or near a Place called Jeremy's Ferry; and for making, repairing, and widening, Roads from thence into the great Roads at Snaresbrooke in the County of Essex, and at Clapton in the County of Middlesex. |
| Kensington to Cranford Bridge Turnpike Trust | 1716 | 3 Geo. 1. c. 14 Pr. | Kensington, Staines and Cranford Bridge Roads Act 1716; An Act for repairing the Highways, from that Part of Counter's Bridge which lies in the Parish of Kensington, in the County of Middlesex, to The Powder Mills in the Road to Staines, and Cranford Bridge, in the said County, in the Road to Colnebrook. |
| Kentish Town Junction Turnpike Trust | 1811 | 51 Geo. 3. c. clvi | Road from Kentish Town to Upper Holloway Act 1811; An Act for making a Public Carriage Road from Kentish Town to Upper Holloway, in the County of Middlesex. |
| Marylebone to Finchley Road Turnpike Trust | 1826 | 7 Geo. 4. c. xc | St. Marylebone and Finchley Turnpike Road and Branch Act 1826; An Act for making a Turnpike Road from Saint Johns Chanel, in the Parish of Saint Mary le bone, to the North East End of Ballard's Lane, abutting upon the North Road in the Parish of Finchley, with a Branch therefrom, in the County of Middlesex. |
| Metropolis North of Thames Turnpike Trust | 1826 | 7 Geo. 4. c. cxlii | Metropolis Roads Act 1826; An Act for consolidating the Trusts of the several Turnpike Roads in the Neighbourhood of the Metropolis, North of the River Thames. |
| New North Road Turnpike Trust; Highbury to Shoreditch Turnpike Trust | 1812 | 52 Geo. 3. c. cliv | Highbury and Shoreditch Road Act 1812; An Act for making a Public Carriage Road from the present Turnpike Road, near the South End of Highbury Place, Islington, to Haberdashers Walk, in the Parish of Saint Leonard, Shoreditch, in the County of Middlesex. |
| Paddington to Harrow Turnpike Trust | 1801 | 41 Geo. 3. (U.K.) c. cxxix | Road from Paddington to Harrow-on-the-Hill Act 1801; An act for amending, widening, improving, and keeping in repair the road leading from Paddington to Harrow-on-the-Hill, in the county of Middlesex. |
| Pinner and Rickmansworth Turnpike Trust | 1809 | 49 Geo. 3. c. li | Rickmansworth, Pinner and Harrow-on-the-Hill Road Act 1809; An Act for repairing, widening, and improving the Road leading from the Town of Rickmersworth, in the County of Hertford, through the Village of Pinner, by Harrow-on-the-Hill, in the County of Middlesex, to or near the Swan Publick House at Sudbury Common, in the Turnpike Road leading from Harrow to London. |
| Shoreditch to Goswell Street Turnpike Trust | | | |
| Staines and Bedfont Turnpike Trust | 1727 | 1 Geo. 2. St. 2. c. 6 | Egham and Bagshot Road Act 1727; An Act for repairing the Road from the Powder Mills on Hounslow Heath, in the County of Middlesex, to a Place called Basingstone, near the Town of Bagshot, in the Parish of Windlesham, in the County of Surrey. |
| Staines and Hampton Turnpike Trust | 1773 | 13 Geo. 3. c. 105 | Hampton to Staines Road Act 1773; An Act for, amending, widening, and keeping in Repair, the Road from the Guide Post at the West End of the Town of Hampton, over Sunbury Common, to the Town of Staines, in the County of Middlesex. |
| Tower Hill to Smithfield Turnpike Trust | 1812 | 52 Geo. 3. c. cxlix | St. Botolph without Aldgate Improvement Act 1812; An Act for widening and improving the Street or Road leading from Tower Hill to the Street called Upper East Smithfield, in the Parish of Saint Botolph without Aldgate, in the County of Middlesex. |
| Wheatstone Turnpike Trust | 1711 | 10 Ann. c. 4 | Highgate and Chipping Barnet Road Act 1711; An Act for repairing the Highway, between Highgate Gatehouse, in the County of Middlesex, and Barnet Blockhouse, in the County of Hertford. |

== Oxfordshire ==
| Trust | Founded | Initial act | |
| Trust | Founded | Citation | Title |
|---|---|---|---|
| Asthal and Buckland Turnpike Trust | 1777 | 17 Geo. 3. c. 105 | Asthall to Buckland Road Act 1777; An Act for amending, widening, and keeping in Repair, the Road leading from the Turnpike Road, in the Parish of Asthall, in the County of Oxford, to the Turnpike Road at or near Buckland, in the County of Berks. |
| Aylesbury, Thame and Shillingford Turnpike Trust | 1770 | 10 Geo. 3. c. 58 | Buckingham and Oxford Roads Act 1770; An Act for amending the Road from Aylesbury, in the County of Buckingham, through Thame and Little Milton, to the Turnpike Road between Bensington and Shillingford, in the County of Oxford. |
| Banbury to Barcheston Turnpike Trust; Banbury, Brailes and Barcheston Turnpike Trust | 1802 | 42 Geo. 3. c. xxxviii | Banbury, Brailes and Barcheston Road Act 1802; An Act for amending, widening, turning, altering, improving and keeping in Repair, the Road leading from the Turnpike Road in the Horse Fair, in the Town of Banbury, in the County of Oxford, through Swalcliffe in the said County of Oxford, and through Brailes in the County of Warwick, to the Bridge crossing the River Stour, in the Parish of Barcheston, in the said County of Warwick. |
| Barrington to Campsfield Turnpike Trust | 1750 | 24 Geo. 2. c. 28 | Gloucester and Oxford Road Act 1750; An Act for repairing the Road from the Top of Crickley Hill, in the County of Gloucester, to Frogg Mill, through the Towns of Northleach, Burford, and Witney, and Parishes of Hanborough and Bloden, to Campsfield, in the Parish of Kidlington, in the County of Oxford, and also the Road from Witney, through Ensham, Cumner, and Botley, to the City of Oxford. |
| Barrington to Campsfield Turnpike Trust | 1834 | 3 & 4 Will. 4. c. ix | York and Scarborough, and Spittle House and Scarborough Roads Act 1833 |
| Bicester, Aynho and Finmere Turnpike Trust | 1791 | 31 Geo. 3. c. 103 | Bicester to Aynho Road Act 1791; An Act for repairing and widening the Road from the Market Place in Bicester in the County of Oxford, to the Buckingham Turnpike Road in Aynho in the County of Northampton. |
| Botley, Fyfield, and Newlands Turnpike Trust | | | |
| Burford and Lechlade Turnpike Trust | 1792 | 32 Geo. 3. c. 153 | Gloucester and Wiltshire Roads Act 1792; An Act for repairing, widening, turning, and altering the Road leading from the Town of Burford, in the County of Oxford, to Leachlade, in the County of Gloucester, and for making a Road from thence to the River Isis or Thames; for building a Bridge across the said River, and for making a Road from thence to join the present Road leading from Leachlade to Inglesham; and for repairing, widening, turning, and altering the said last mentioned Road, to and through the Town of Highworth, in the County of Wilts, to the present Turnpike Road leading from Cricklade to Swindon, in the same County. |
| Burford, Chipping Norton and Banbury Turnpike Trust; Burford, Chipping Norton, Banbury, Stow and Aynho Turnpike Trust | 1770 | 10 Geo. 3. c. 101 | Oxford, Gloucester and Notts Roads Act 1770; An Act for repairing and widening the Road from Burford to Banbury in the County of Oxford; and from Burford aforesaid to the Turnpike Road leading to Stow, in the County of Gloucester, at the Bottom of Stow Hill; and from Swerford Gate, in the said County of Oxford, to the Turnpike Road in Aynho, in the County of Northampton. |
| Charlbury Roads Turnpike Trust | 1800 | 39 & 40 Geo. 3. c. xvi | Witney and Woodstock Roads Act 1800; An Act for amending, altering, improving, and keeping in Repair, the Road leading from the Turnpike Road in Witney to the Turnpike Road on Swerford Heath, and also the Road leading from the Turnpike Road from Woodstock to Birmingham, through Charlbury, to the Turnpike Road from Chipping Norton to Burford, all in the County of Oxford. |
| Drayton Lane and Edgehill Turnpike Trust | 1753 | 26 Geo. 2. c. 78 | Drayton and Edgehill Road Act 1753; An Act to widen and repair the Road from the Guide Post near the End of Drayton Lane near Banbury in the County of Oxford, to the House called The Sun Rising at the Top of Edge Hill in the County of Warwick. |
| Enstone, Heyford and Bicester Turnpike Trust; Enstone, Heyford, Bicester, Weston and Kirtlington Turnpike Trust | 1793 | 33 Geo. 3. c. 180 | Bicester Roads Act 1793; An Act for amending, widening, and repairing the Road from Clay Hill, in the Turnpike Road between Neat Enstone and Chipping Norton, in the County of Oxford, over Heyford Bridge, to the Water Lane, in the Town of Bicester, in the said County, and from Bicester aforesaid to the Turnpike Road in Weston-on-the-Green, in the said County. |
| Faringdon to Burford Turnpike Trust | 1771 | 11 Geo. 3. c. 84 | Farringdon to Burford Road Act 1771; An Act for repairing, widening, turning, and altering, the Road from the Market-house, in the Town of Great Farringdon, in the County of Berks, to Burford, in the County of Oxford. |
| Galley Hill and Clanfield Turnpike Trust; Galley Hill and Clanfield Cross Turnpike Trust | 1771 | 11 Geo. 3. c. 73 | Oxford Roads Act 1771; An Act for amending, widening, turning, and altering, the Road from the Bottom of Galley Hill, near the Town of Witney, to the Cross in Clanfield, in the County of Oxford. |
| Gosford Gate Turnpike Trust; Gosford Road Turnpike Trust | 1755 | 28 Geo. 2. c. 46 | Warwick and Oxford Roads Act 1755; An Act for repairing and widening the Roads leading from the Cross of Hand near Finford Bridge in the County of Warwick, through the Town of Southam in the same County, to the Borough of Banbury in the County of Oxford; and from The Guide Post in the Village of Adderbury in the same County, through Kidlington, to the Mile Way leading towards the City of Oxford; and also the Road leading from a Place called The Two Mile Tree near the City of Oxford, over Gosford otherwise Gossard Bridge, to a certain Gate entering upon Weston on the Green in the said County. |
| Gosford Gate Turnpike Trust; Gosford Road Turnpike Trust | 1781 | 21 Geo. 3. c. 87 | Oxford Roads Act 1781; An Act for repairing and widening the Road from a certain Gate on the Turnpike Road at or near the South End of the Town of Weston on the Green, in the County of Oxford, to the Turnpike Road on Kidlington Green, in the said County. |
| Henley and Dorchester Turnpike Trust | 1735 | 9 Geo. 2. c. 14 | Berkshire and Oxfordshire Roads Act 1735; An Act for repairing the Roads leading from Henley Bridge, in the County of Oxford, to Dorchester Bridge, and from thence to Culham Bridge, and to a Place called Milestone, in the Road leading to Magdalen Bridge, in the said County. |
| Islip District Turnpike Trust | | | |
| Kidlington and Deddington Turnpike Trust | 1755 | 28 Geo. 2. c. 46 | Warwick and Oxford Roads Act 1755; An Act for repairing and widening the Roads leading from the Cross of Hand near Finford Bridge in the County of Warwick, through the Town of Southam in the same County, to the Borough of Banbury in the County of Oxford; and from The Guide Post in the Village of Adderbury in the same County, through Kidlington, to the Mile Way leading towards the City of Oxford; and also the Road leading from a Place called The Two Mile Tree near the City of Oxford, over Gosford otherwise Gossard Bridge, to a certain Gate entering upon Weston on the Green in the said County. |
| Kidlington and Deddington Turnpike Trust | 1777 | 17 Geo. 3. c. 88 | Oxford Roads Act 1777; An Act for enlarging the Term, and altering the Powers of an Act, made in the Twenty-eighth Year of the Reign of His late Majesty, for repairing and widening several Roads therein mentioned, in the Counties of Warwick and Oxford, so far as relates to the Road from the Guide Post in the Village of Adderbury, through Kidlington, to the Mile-way leading towards the City of Oxford. |
| Oxford Mileways | | | |
| St Clements Turnpike Trust | 1771 | 11 Geo. 3. c. 19 | Oxford Improvement Act 1771; An Act for amending certain of the Mile Ways leading to Oxford; for making a commodious Entrance through the Parish of Saint Clement; for rebuilding or repairing Magdalen Bridge; for making commodious Roads from the said Bridge through the University and City, and the Avenues leading thereto; for cleansing and lighting the Streets, Lanes, and Places, within the said University and City, and the Suburbs thereof, and the said Parish of Saint Clement; for removing Nuisances and Annoyances therefrom, and preventing the like for the future; for empowering Colleges and Corporations to alienate their Estates there; for removing, holding, and regulating Markets within the said City, and for other Purposes. |
| Stokenchurch, Wheatley, Begbroke Turnpike Trust; Stokenchurch and Woodstock Turnpike Trust | 1718 | 5 Geo. 1. c. 1 Pr. | Stokenchurch and New Woodstock Road Act 1718; An Act for repairing the Roads from the Top of Stoken Church Hill to Enslow Bridge; and the Road leading from Wheatly Bridge, through the City of Oxon, by Begbrooke, to New Woodstock, in the County of Oxon (except the Mill-way on each Side the said City); and to disable all Commissioners or Trustees, appointed for repairing of any Highways or Roads, to have any Place of Profit arising out of the Toll for repairing such Highways or Roads. |
| Stony Stratford to Woodstock Turnpike Trust | 1769 | 9 Geo. 3. c. 88 | Bucks and Oxford Roads Act 1769; An Act for repairing the Road from Stoney Stratford, in the County of Bucks, through the Towns of Buckingham and Bicester, to the Town of Woodstock, in the County of Oxford. |
| Thame and Bicester Turnpike Trust | 1833 | 3 & 4 Will. 4. c. xxiv | Bicester and Aylesbury Road Act 1833 |
| Thame to Postcombe Turnpike Trust | 1785 | 25 Geo. 3. c. 127 | Buckingham and Oxford Roads Act 1785; An Act to enlarge the Term and Powers of an Act passed in the Tenth Year of His present Majesty's Reign, for amending the Road from Aylesbury, in the County of Buckingham, through Thame and Little Milton, to the Turnpike Road between Bensington and Shillingford in the County of Oxford, and for amending the Road from the Turnpike Road at Thame, to the Oxford Turnpike Road between Postcomb and Tetsworth in the said County of Oxford. |
| Woodstock to Rollright Lane Turnpike Trust | 1729 | 3 Geo. 2. c. 21 | Oxfordshire Roads Act 1729; An Act for repairing and amending the several Roads leading from Woodstock, through Kiddington and Enston, to Roll Right Lane, and from Enslow Bridge to Kiddington aforesaid, in the County of Oxon. |

== Surrey ==
| Trust | Founded | Initial act | |
| Trust | Founded | Citation | Title |
|---|---|---|---|
| Alford and Guildford Turnpike Trust | 1757 | 30 Geo. 2. c. 60 | Guildford and Arundel Road Act 1757; An Act for repairing and widening the Road from the North End of Dapdon Wharf, in the Parish of Stoke next Guldeford, through Guldeford, to Andrew's Cross and to Alford Bars in the County of Surrey, and from thence to Saint Mary's Gate in Arundel in the County of Sussex. |
| Bagshot to Hertfordbridge Turnpike Trust | 1753 | 26 Geo. 2. c. 51 | Surrey and Southampton Roads Act 1753; An Act for repairing and widening the Roads leading from a Place called Basing-stone, near the Town of Bagshot, in the Parish of Windlesham, in the County of Surry, through Frimley and Farnham, in the same County; and from thence, through Bentley, Hollyborn, Alton, Chawton, Ropley, Bishops Sutton, New Alresford, and Mattingley otherwise Matterley Lane, to the City of Winchester, in the County of Southampton. |
| Bermondsey, Rotherhithe and Deptford Turnpike Trust | 1748 | 22 Geo. 2. c. 31 | Southwark Roads Act 1748; An Act for opening and making a new Road from the East End of New Street, in the Parish of Saint John, Southwark, to and through the several Places therein mentioned, and for keeping the said Road in Repair for the future. |
| Bramley and Ridgewick Turnpike Trust | 1818 | 58 Geo. 3. c. lxix | Bramley to Ridgewick Turnpike Road Act 1818; An Act for making and maintaining a Turnpike Road from Bramley in the County of Surrey, to Ridgewick in the County of Sussex. |
| Croydon and Reigate Turnpike Trust | 1807 | 47 Geo. 3 Sess. 1. c. xxv | Road from Foxley Hatch to Reigate Act 1807; An Act for making and maintaining a Road from Foxley Hatch, in the Parish of Croydon, into the Town of Reigate, in the County of Surrey. |
| Egham and Bagshot Turnpike Trust | 1727 | 1 Geo. 2. St. 2. c. 6 | Egham and Bagshot Road Act 1727; An Act for repairing the Road from the Powder Mills on Hounslow Heath, in the County of Middlesex, to a Place called Basingstone, near the Town of Bagshot, in the Parish of Windlesham, in the County of Surrey. |
| Epsom, Ewell, Tooting etc Turnpike Trust; Epsom Turnpike Trust | 1755 | 28 Geo. 2. c. 57 | Surrey Roads Act 1755; An Act for amending, widening, and keeping in Repair, the Roads from Epsom, through Ewell, to Tooting, and from Ewell to Kingston upon Thames and Thames Ditton, in the County of Surry. |
| Gatton Lodge to Povey Cross Turnpike Trust; Gatton and Povey Cross Turnpike Trust | 1816 | 56 Geo. 3. c. xxx | Road from Gatton Lodge to Povey Cross Act 1816; An Act for making and maintaining a Road from near Gatton Lodge, in the County of Surrey, to Povey Cross, in the said County. |
| Godalming and Painshill Turnpike Trust | 1826 | 7 Geo. 4. c. xiii | Godalming and Pains Hill Road Act 1826; An Act for making and maintaining a Road from Godalming, through Hascomb, to Pains Hill in the County of Surrey. |
| Godstone and Highgate Turnpike Trust | 1730 | 4 Geo. 2. c. 8 | Surrey and Sussex Roads Act 1730; An Act for the more effectual repairing the Road leading from Godstone, in the County of Surrey, to Highgate, at the Entrance into Ashdown Forest, in the Parish of East Grinsted, in the County of Sussex. |
| Guildford and Farnham Turnpike Trust | 1757 | 31 Geo. 2. c. 78 | Guildford to Farnham Road Act 1757; An Act for repairing and widening the Road from the Town of Guldeford to the Directing Post near the Town of Farnham, in the County of Surrey. |
| Haslemere Turnpike Trust | 1764 | 4 Geo. 3. c. 63 | Milford to Portsmouth Road Act 1764; An Act for amending and widening the Road from a Place near the Village of Milford, through Haslemere, to the Portsmouth Road between Lippock and Rake, in the several Counties of Surrey, Sussex, and Southampton. |
| Kent Road to Deptford Turnpike Trust | | | |
| Kingston and Leatherhead Turnpike Trust | 1811 | 51 Geo. 3. c. cix | Road from Kingston-upon-Thames to Leatherhead Act 1811; An Act for making and maintaining a Road from Kingston upon Thames to Leatherhead, in the County of Surrey. |
| Kingston and Sheetbridge Turnpike Trust | 1748 | 22 Geo. 2. c. 35 | Surrey and Sussex Roads Act 1748; An Act for repairing and widening the Road leading from the Town of Kingston upon Thames, in the County of Surry, to a Place called Sheetbridge, near Petersfield, in the County of Southampton, and also the Road from Hindhead Heath, through Fernhurst Lane and Midhurst, to the City of Chichester, in the County of Sussex. |
| Leatherhead and Stoke next Guildford Turnpike Trust | 1757 | 31 Geo. 2. c. 77 | Leatherhead and Guildford Road Act 1757; An Act for repairing and widening the Road from The Swan Inn at Leatherhead to the May-pole at the Upper End of Spital or Somerset Street, in the Parish of Stoake near the Town of Guldeford, in the County of Surrey. |
| Limpsfield Turnpike Trust | 1770 | 10 Geo. 3. c. 62 | Kent and Surrey Roads Act 1770; An Act for the repairing, widening, and keeping in Repair, the Road leading from Eaton Bridge, Turnpike Road at Cockham Hill, in the Parish of Westerham, in the County of Kent, through the Village of Limpsfield, to the Village of Titsey, over Botley Hill, Wormsheath, and Willingham Common, to the Turnpike Road leading from Croydon to Godstone, in the County of Surry. |
| Ockley and Warnham Turnpike Trust | 1812 | 52 Geo. 3. c. xxvi | Road from Ockley to Warnham Act 1812; An Act for making and maintaining a Road from Stone Street Hatch at Ockley, in the County of Surrey, to join a Branch of the Horsham and Guildford Road at Warnham, in the County of Sussex. |
| Reigate Turnpike Trust | 1755 | 28 Geo. 2. c. 28 | Sutton and Reigate Road Act 1755; An Act for repairing and widening the Road from Sutton in the County of Surrey, through the Borough of Reigate, by Sidlow Mill, to Povey Cross; and from Sutton aforesaid, through Cheam and over Howell Hill, to Ewell; and also the Road from Tadworth, by the Windmill, to the Bottom of Pebble Hill in the said County. |
| Southwark to Kent Road Turnpike Trust; Great Dover Street Turnpike Trust | 1809 | 49 Geo. 3. c. clxxxvi | Road from Southwark to the Kent Road Act 1809; An Act for making and maintaining a Road from the Borough of Southwark to the Kent Road in the County of Surrey. |
| Surrey and Sussex Turnpike Trust | 1717 | 4 Geo. 1. c. 4 Pr. | London, East Grinstead, Sutton and Kingston Roads Act 1717; An Act for amending the Roads from the City of London to the Town of East Grinstead, in the County of Sussex, and to the Towns of Sutton and Kingston, in the County of Surrey. |
| Surrey New Roads Turnpike Trust; Blackfriars to Newington Butts Turnpike Trust | 1769 | 9 Geo. 3. c. 89 | South London Roads Act 1769; An Act for making a Road from the South End of Blackfriars Bridge to the present Turnpike Road cross Saint George's Fields, and from thence to some Place at or near the House called The Dog and Duck, and to Newington Butts, in the County of Surry; and for empowering the Trustees for carrying into Execution an Act, passed in the Twenty-fourth Year of the Reign of His late Majesty, to repair, light, and watch the said Roads when made. |

== Sussex ==
| Trust | Founded | Initial act | |
| Trust | Founded | Citation | Title |
|---|---|---|---|
| Alford Bars and Newbridge Turnpike Trust | 1757 | 30 Geo. 2. c. 60 | Guildford and Arundel Road Act 1757; An Act for repairing and widening the Road from the North End of Dapdon Wharf, in the Parish of Stoke next Guldeford, through Guldeford, to Andrew's Cross and to Alford Bars in the County of Surrey, and from thence to Saint Mary's Gate in Arundel in the County of Sussex. |
| Alford Bars and Newbridge Turnpike Trust | 1821 | 1 & 2 Geo. 4. c. xxxv | Alfold Bars and Newbridge Road Act 1821; An Act for enlarging the Term and Powers of several Acts, passed in the Thirtieth Year of the Reign of His late Majesty King George the Second, and in the Eighteenth and Thirty ninth Years of the Reign of His late Majesty King George the Third, so far as the same relate to the Road from Alfold Bars, in the County of Surrey, to Newbridge, in the County of Sussex. |
| Beech Down to Heathfield etc. Turnpike Trust | | | |
| Beeding to Old Shoreham Turnpike Trust | | | |
| Billingshurst to Broadbridge Heath Turnpike Trust | | | |
| Brede Turnpike Trust | | | |
| Brighton and Newhaven Turnpike Trust | | | |
| Brighton, Cuckfield and West Grimsted Turnpike Trust | | | |
| Brighton, Shoreham and Lancing Turnpike Trust | | | |
| Broil Park-Gate to Battle Turnpike Trust | | | |
| Burwash to Ticehurst Turnpike Trust | | | |
| Bury Turnpike Trust; Arundel to Petworth Turnpike Trust | 1803 | 43 Geo. 3. c. lxvii | |
| Chichester, Dell Quay and Fernhurst Turnpike Trust | | | |
| Cosham to Chichester Turnpike Trust | | | |
| Cowfold to Henfield Turnpike Trust | | | |
| Crouch Hill and Hurstpeirpoint Turnpike Trust | | | |
| Ditcheling and Clayton Branch Turnpike Trust | | | |
| Etchingham to Burwash Turnpike Trust | | | |
| Ewhurst to Norian Turnpike Trust | | | |
| Five Oaks Turnpike Trust | | | |
| Flimwell to Hastings Turnpike Trust | | | |
| Henfield Turnpike Trust | | | |
| Henfield to Brighthelmston Turnpike Trust | | | |
| Hodges and Cuckfield Turnpike Trust | | | |
| Hollington and Hastings Turnpike Trust | | | |
| Horley and Cuckfield Turnpike Trust | | | |
| Horley Common to Uckfield Turnpike Trust | | | |
| Horsebridge and Horsham Turnpike Trust | | | |
| Horsham and Crawley Turnpike Trust | | | |
| Horsham and Dorking Turnpike Trust | | | |
| Horsham and Guildford Turnpike Trust | | | |
| Horsham and Steyning Turnpike Trust | | | |
| Hurstpierpoint and Cuckfield Turnpike Trust | | | |
| Hurstpierpoint and Pontings Branch Turnpike Trust | | | |
| Lewes and Brighthelmston Turnpike Trust | | | |
| Lewes, Eastbourne and Hailsham Turnpike Trust | | | |
| Malling Street to Wych Cross Turnpike Trust | | | |
| Mayfield and Wadhurst Turnpike Trust | | | |
| Midhurst and Sheetbridge Turnpike Trust | | | |
| Milford to Portsmouth Road Turnpike Trust | | | |
| New Chappel, Linfield and Brighton Turnpike Trust | | | |
| Offham and Ditcheling Turnpike Trust | | | |
| Offham to Witch Cross Turnpike Trust | | | |
| Petworth Turnpike Trust | | | |
| Pulborough to Horsham Turnpike Trust | | | |
| Pyecombe and Hickstead Turnpike Trust | | | |
| Ringmer and Hurst Green Turnpike Trust | | | |
| Robertsbridge Clappers Turnpike Trust | | | |
| Rowhook Branch Turnpike Trust | | | |
| Rye Turnpike Trust | | | |
| Shipley Turnpike Trust | | | |
| Sloughham to West Grinstead Turnpike Trust | | | |
| South Malling to Alfiston Turnpike Trust | | | |
| St Leonards and Sedlescomb Turnpike Trust | | | |
| Staplecross Turnpike Trust | | | |
| Stoke, Guildford, Arundell Turnpike Trust | | | |
| Stonegate Turnpike Trust | | | |
| Storrington and Ball's Hut Turnpike Trust | | | |
| Storrington and Wiston Turnpike Trust | | | |
| Tunbridge Wells and Mayfield Turnpike Trust | | | |
| Uckfield and Tunbridge Wells Turnpike Trust | | | |
| Worthing Turnpike Trust | | | |
| Worthing and Lancing Turnpike Trust | 1826 | 7 Geo. 4. c. x | Worthing and Lancing Turnpike Road and Sea Defences Act 1826; An Act for making and maintaining a Turnpike Road from Worthing to Lancing in the County of Sussex, and Groynes, Embankments and other Sea Defences, for protecting such Road and the Lands adjoining from the future Encroachments of the Sea. |
