= Newenden =

Coordinates: 51.0174°N 0.6172°E

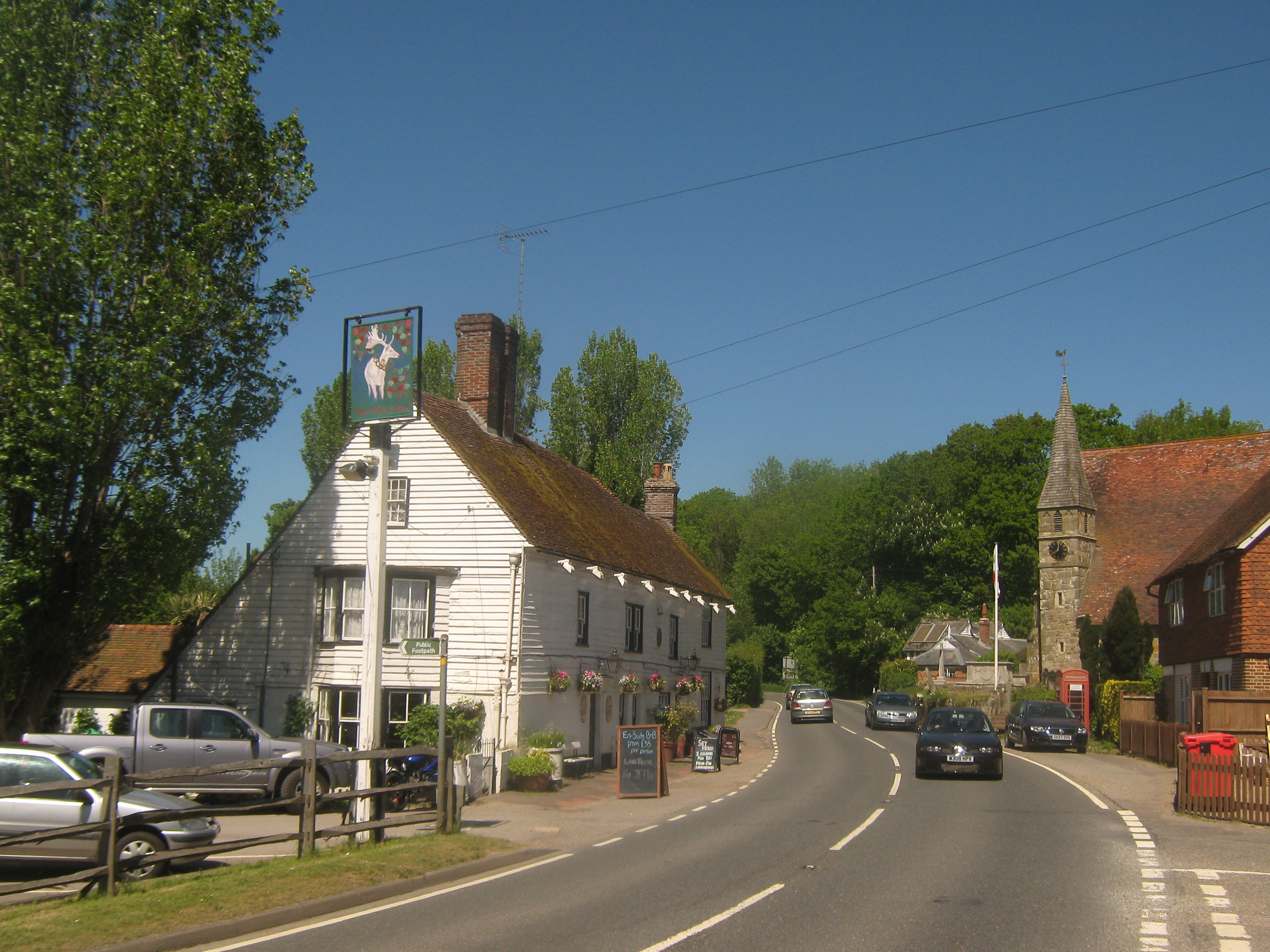
- The White Hart and St Peter's Church

- Location within Kent
- Area: 4.23 km^{2} (1.63 sq mi)
- Population: 223 (Civil Parish 2011)
  - Density: 53/km^{2} (140/sq mi)
- OS grid reference: TQ835275
- Civil parish: Newenden
- District: Ashford
- Shire county: Kent
- Region: South East
- Country: England
- Sovereign state: United Kingdom
- Post town: CRANBROOK
- Postcode district: TN18
- Dialling code: 01797
- Police: Kent
- Fire: Kent
- Ambulance: South East Coast
- UK Parliament: Weald of Kent
- Website: Newenden Parish Council

Newenden is a small village and civil parish in area and population in the Ashford District of Kent, England, just north of the boundary with East Sussex.

== Geography ==
The village is clustered together along the south slope and at the foot of the end of a tall escarpment by the River Rother, six miles (6.4 km) south-west of Tenterden on the A28. Newenden is located immediately north of the Rother which forms the county boundary with East Sussex. As the land at the very edge of the parish and lowest points is marshy, the narrow hill escarpment itself is known locally as Frogs Hill.

== History ==
The village was recorded as Newedene in Domesday Book. Several antiquarians speculated (baselessly) about a Roman name from when the Rother was a more navigable river than in modern times.

Lossenham Friary was established northeast of the village in around 1242 but it was burnt down in 1275 and no remains are visible.

In March 1300, wardrobe accounts of King Edward I of England include a reference to a game called "creag" being played at Newenden by Prince Edward, then aged 15. It has been suggested that creag was an early form of cricket.

Newenden Bridge was constructed in 1706, providing a fixed link across the Rother to East Sussex. It is Grade II* listed and a scheduled monument.

== Amenities ==
The ancient parish church is dedicated to Saint Peter; it was restored in 1859. A large pub is marked in maps next to the river.

== See also ==
- Listed buildings in Newenden
