= Eagle catching fish =

German anti-Christian and neo-pagan symbol

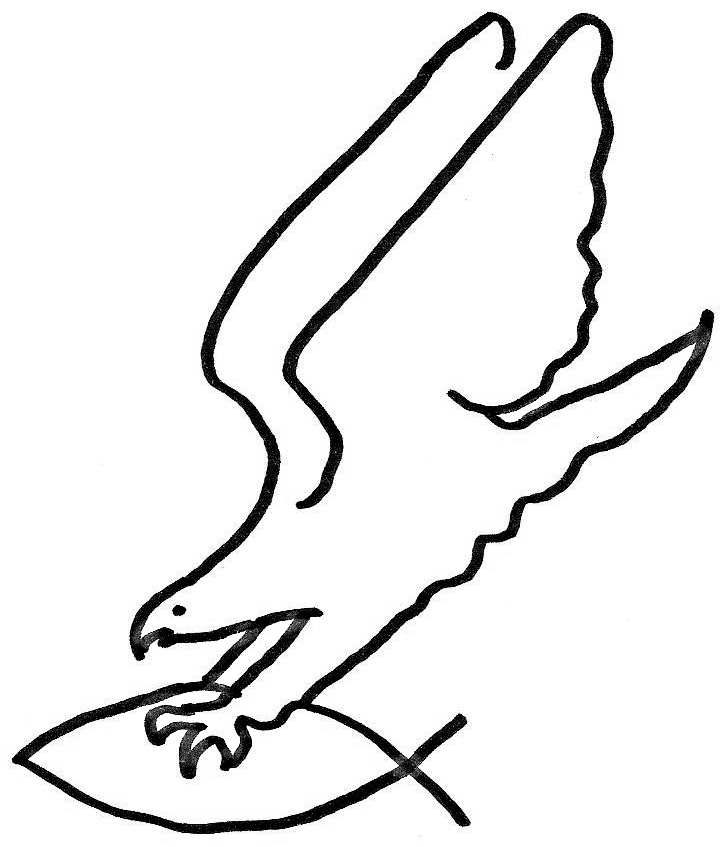
A drawn version of the symbol

Eagle catching fish or eagle catching ichthys (German: Adler fängt Fisch or Adler fängt Ichthys) is a German anti-Christian and neo-pagan symbol.

It depicts an eagle catching an ichthys, a fish symbol associated with Christianity. The symbol is supposed to represent pagan strength and victory over Christianity. It was first created in 1989, and later registered as a trademark in 2003 by Holocaust denier Jürgen Rieger for the far-right German neo-pagan organisation Artgemeinschaft Germanische Glaubens-Gemeinschaft, which continued to hold the trademark until the organization was banned in 2023.

Another anti-Christian symbol known as "Odins Raben" (lit. Odin's Ravens) similarly depicts two ravens attacking an Ichthys.

While the symbol originated from, and is mostly associated with, far-right paganism, this association is not inherently the case.

== Usage ==
The design of the symbol can vary.

A variant of the symbol was used on a hoodie named "No Inquisition" produced by the clothing brand Thor Steinar, which is popular among the far-right in Germany. Some German pagan metal bands, such as XIV Dark Centuries, also have previously used the symbol.

Coat of arms of the former Müritz district

After the formation of the district of Mecklenburgische Seenplatte, a new coat of arms was needed, with one of the proposed designs featuring the osprey catching a fish from the former coat of arms of Müritz district (which was integrated into the new Mecklenburgische Seenplatte district). Despite the clear association with the previous district and local wildlife, some criticized the design as being too similar to the eagle catching fish symbol, widely associated with its trademark owner the far-right Artgemeinschaft. Due to this association the design was dropped with the district instead adopting a coat of arms including only the waves from the Müritz arms.

=== Legal status ===
While registered as a trademark by Jürgen Rieger for the Artgemeinschaft in 2003, said trademark has been evaluated to be sittenwidrig (immoral or unconscionable) and thus void if the church decided to take action against it, although this never happened. As the Artgemeinschaft retained the trademark over the symbol until being banned in 2023 however, it [the symbol] was included in the ban of the organization and thus added to be included in the Strafgesetzbuch section 86a, meaning that the symbol is now illegal in Germany (in the same way that the Nazi swastika is).

== Assessments ==
The Evangelical Association of Saxony and the Office for Worldview and Sect Issues of the Evangelical-Lutheran Church of Saxony recognizes the symbol as clearly anti-Christian symbolism. It did not, however, conclude an inherent and clear association to the far-right extremist scene. A 2007 article by the church district in Schneeberg however concluded that the symbol represents "[A]ntisemitic, right-wing extremist, and anti-church ideas mixed together" as well as the wish to "revive old Germanic religion and cults."

== See also ==
- Artgemeinschaft
- Esoteric Neo-Nazism
- Modern paganism
- Christian blasphemy
- Anti-Christian sentiment
- Variations of the ichthys symbol
