= Passive electioneering =

Wearing campaign items or carrying signs

Passive electioneering is the act of wearing campaign paraphernalia or carrying signs to a polling place with the intent of influencing voters. Across the United States laws vary relating to passive electioneering. In the fall of 2008, officials in Virginia moved to ban the wearing of campaign paraphernalia. New York has a similar law in place.

In 2008, internet political organizers were cautioning voters not to wear campaign T-shirts at the polls.

At least seven states, Maine, Montana, New Jersey, New York, Vermont, Virginia, and Kansas prohibit wearing campaign buttons, stickers and badges inside polling places. Efforts to enforce a similar ban are headed to court in Pennsylvania. The American Civil Liberties Union argued that the ban violates the First Amendment's right to free speech.

== United States ==
=== New York ===
The State of New York has a rarely enforced law that prohibits wearing campaign buttons or T-shirt at a polling place. In the fall of 2008, New York State Board of Elections Spokesman Bob Brehm stated that voters at the polls who wear a campaign button or T-shirt will be asked to remove the item.

=== Virginia ===
The Virginia State Board of Elections voted on Tuesday October 14, 2008, to ban clothing and hats as well as buttons and other paraphernalia that directly advocate the election or defeat of a specific candidate or issue.

== Canada ==
While Canadian electoral law allows representatives of the political parties to be present in polling stations, nobody present at the polling station is permitted to wear or carry anything identifying themselves as a member of a political party or supporter or opponent of any political cause. This includes voters. Partisan officials are also not permitted to campaign immediately in front of a polling station, nor may anyone bring any campaign literature into the station.

The equipment used by polling staff has to meet strict colour criteria. Staff may be refused work if their clothing is of a "partisan colour"

== United Kingdom ==
Wearing an explicitly party political item or bringing any political material into a polling station can be classed as an attempt to intimidate voters. Clothing that is political but does not support or attack a party (for example, a Che Guevara t-shirt) may still be allowed.
