= Nazi chic =

Fashion trend

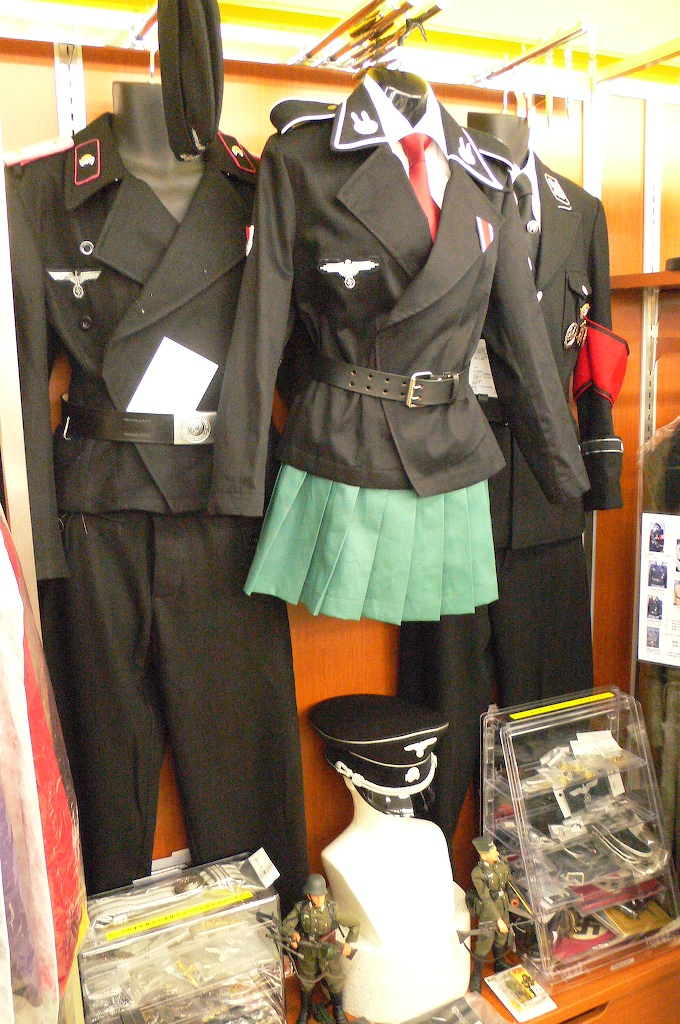
Nazi chic for sale in Tokyo

Nazi chic is the use and appropriation of style, imagery, iconography, and paraphernalia associated with Nazi Germany in high fashion. Nazi chic originally emerged through Malcolm McLaren and Vivienne Westwood's designs, sold at their boutique Sex, which became influential in the development of punk fashion. However, the Hells Angels motorcycle club in the 1950s and rock musicians in the 1960s and 1970s had previously appropriated Nazi memorabilia.

The style was later adopted by the wider fashion industry and partially inspired the leather subculture. Although the trend originated in the West, it later became popular in Asia.

== Europe and United States ==
=== Forerunners ===
==== 1950s–1970s ====
The American Hells Angels motorcycle club wore Nazi memorabilia as early as the 1950s, member Sonny Barger stated that the group's obsession with Nazi paraphernalia was "not political" and partially originated from one early member who got hold of a "Nazi belt" that was brought back from the Second World War by his father. Barger stated "The Nazi flag was hung outside their clubhouse merely "to piss people off". Additionally, a patch worn by select club members consists of two Nazi-style SS lightning bolts below the words "Filthy Few". Some law enforcement officials claim that the "Filthy Few" patch is awarded only to those who have committed or are prepared to commit murder on the club's behalf.

During the 1960s, territorial surfers formed loose gangs that surfed in a certain break or beach and fiercely protected their "territory" from outsiders. These surfers were known as "surf punks" or "surf nazis". The term "surf nazi" initially arose to describe a territorial, aggressive, and obsessive surfer. Some surf clubs in the 1960s, particularly at Windansea in La Jolla, embraced the term by performing Nazi salutes, wearing swastikas and Stahlhelm helmets, and painting swastikas on their surfboards and on the Windansea pump house. American artist Ed Roth sold plastic Nazi stormtrooper helmets to surfers in the 1960s, and told Time magazine, "That Hitler really did a helluva public relations job for me." Surfer Miki Dora was noted as a pioneer of surfer "localism" by The New Yorker and would be known to spray paint swastikas on his surf board, while surfer Matt Warshaw later stated, "We’d paint a swastika on something for no other reason than to piss people off. Which it did. So next time we’d paint two swastikas, just to piss ’em off more."

In the mid-1960s, some filmmakers looking for edgy and controversial ideas incorporated Nazi themes into their works for shock value, which became known as Nazi exploitation films, with the 1965 film Censored described as having "the dubious honour of being the very first skinflick to mix Nazis and naked women". Additionally, musicians such as Keith Moon of the Who, Brian Jones of the Rolling Stones, and Vivian Stanshall of Bonzo Dog Doo-Dah Band would wear nazi uniforms in publicity photoshoots. Guitarist Ron Asheton of the Stooges collected Nazi memorabilia and wore a swastika armband along with an Iron Cross on stage during live performances with the band.

In the early 1970s, glam rock acts incorporated Nazi symbolism into their works, often for the shock value and outrageousness, or for comedic effect. Ron Mael of the American band Sparks adopted a signature toothbrush moustache which was compared to that of Adolf Hitler. Steve Priest, of the glam rock band the Sweet, wore a Nazi uniform and fake toothbrush moustache in a December 1973 live performance of "Block Buster!", on Top of the Pops. David Bowie would also later appropriate Nazi iconography with his persona "The Thin White Duke" as well as during his Berlin Trilogy. Between 1973–75, Cleveland proto-punk band the Electric Eels drew swastikas on their concert posters, with the early Cleveland punk scene's live events being nicknamed "Extermination Nights".

English heavy metal musician Lemmy of the band Motörhead collected Nazi memorabilia and had an Iron Cross on his bass guitar, but stated that he collected these memorabilia for aesthetics, historical purposes, and interests only. He considered himself "an atheist and an anarchist" and that he was "anti-communism, fascism, any extreme".

=== Origins ===
==== Late 1970s–1990s ====
By the late 1970s, as part of the early punk subculture, several items of clothing designed to shock and offend the Establishment became popular. Among these punk fashion items was a T-shirt displaying a swastika, an upside-down crucifix and the word DESTROY– which was worn by Johnny Rotten of the Sex Pistols, seen in the video for "Pretty Vacant". The Rolling Stones' Mick Jagger would later briefly wear the shirt in concert. Rotten wore the swastika another time with a gesture that looked like a Nazi salute. Additionally, a swastika shirt would also be worn by Sid Vicious. In 1976, Siouxsie Sioux of Siouxsie and the Banshees was also known to wear a swastika armband with fetish S and M clothing, including fishnets and a whip. These musicians are commonly thought to have worn such clothing for shock value directed towards the WWII Generation. Additionally, industrial music associated artists such as Throbbing Gristle, Psychic TV, Death in June and Boyd Rice made use of Nazi symbolism.

In 1984, two T-shirt designs featuring Adolf Hitler were produced in West Germany. The more famous of the two was the "Adolf Hitler European Tour" design, which featured a picture of Hitler against the backdrop of a map of Europe, with conquered territories shaded; a less popular T-shirt featured Hitler giving the Roman salute, and a yo-yo hanging from his hand. The text read "European yo-yo champion 1939–1945". Sale of the apparel led to a legal case in Germany, in an attempt to have it banned as "glorifying genocide". In 1988, Ralph Engelstad was criticized for a party he held at his Imperial Palace hotel-casino in Las Vegas featuring bartenders wearing the "European Tour" shirts. In 1990, the ACLU represented a high school student on Long Island who was told to remove the shirt or face suspension by school officials who claimed the shirt was anti-Semitic.

=== 2000s–2020s ===
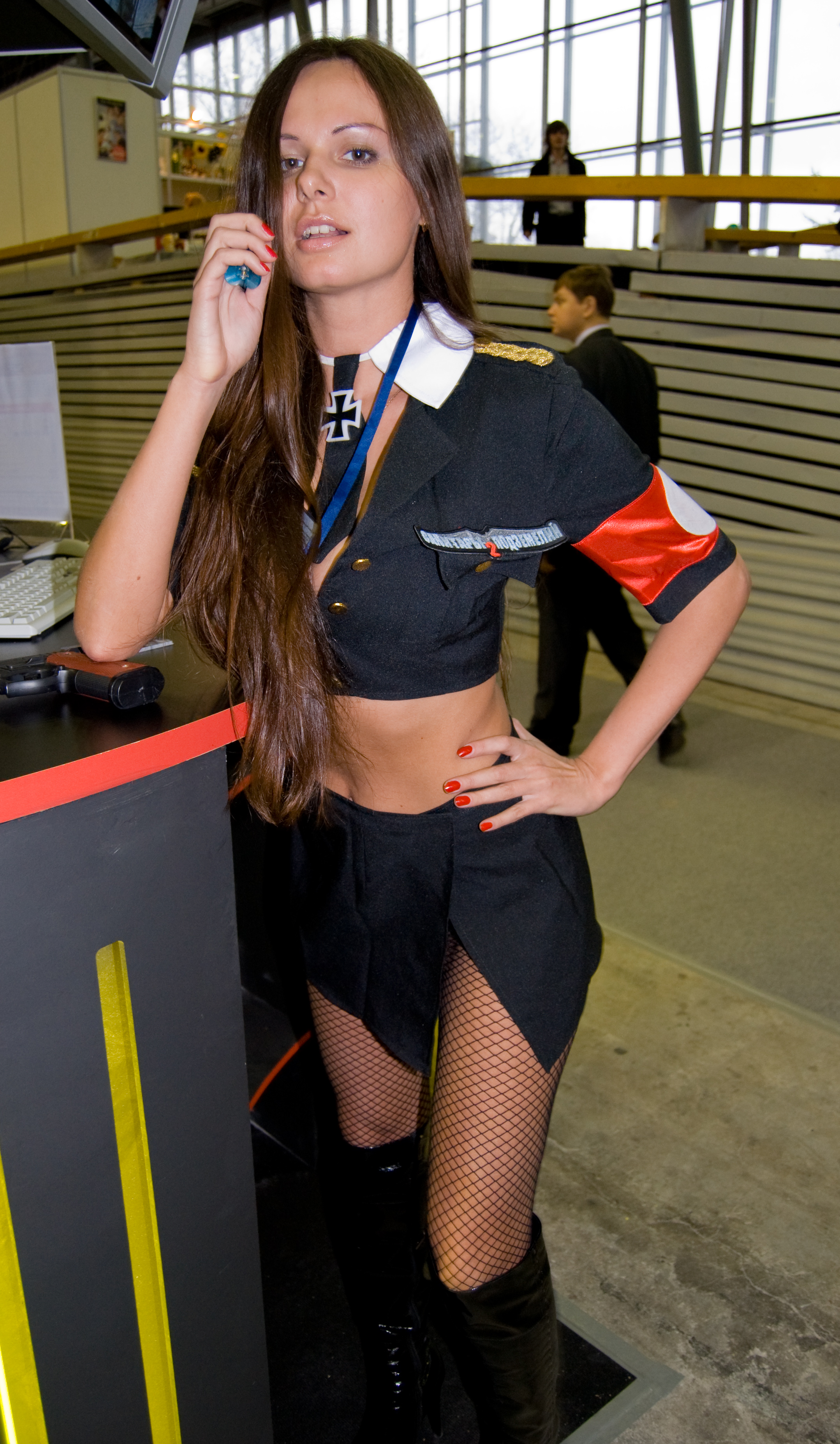
A promotional model wearing Nazi-inspired fashion at IgroMir in Russia, 2008

In early 2005, a designer using the pseudonym "Helmut Doork" began marketing a parody souvenir T-shirt with the slogans "My grandparents went to Auschwitz and all I got was this lousy t-shirt!" and "Arbeit Macht Frei." In response to a complaint from the Anti-Defamation League, the design was removed from CafePress' website in late 2006. The creator later uploaded it to Printfection. After Printfection removed it without explanation, the creator then released it into the public domain, giving anyone permission to print and/or commercialize the design.

Nazi chic fashion can be seen in the music videos for Madonna's "Justify My Love" (1990), Marilyn Manson's "The Fight Song" (2001), and Lady Gaga's "LoveGame" (2009).

== Other examples ==
In an interview with Welt am Sonntag, Bryan Ferry, the English singer and musician, acknowledged that he calls his studio in west London his "Führerbunker". He was quoted as saying, "My God, the Nazis knew how to put themselves in the limelight and present themselves". ... Leni Riefenstahl's movies and Albert Speer's buildings and the mass parades and the flags – just amazing. Really beautiful."

In 2005, Prince Harry was criticized for wearing a costume with a swastika armband causing considerable embarrassment to his family. Harry's impromptu costume resembled the Afrika Korps, rather than more political units such as the SS. Writer Moyra Bremner commented on BBC News 24 that no one had stopped the prince wearing the costume.

In 2011, alternative hip hop group OFWGKTA was described by the Huffington Post as using nazi iconography for shock value, stating "they brandish the swastika and call themselves Black Nazis".

In 2013, The Guardian published an article on the Danish post-punk band Iceage's controversy regarding their appropriation of Nazi imagery.

== Asia ==
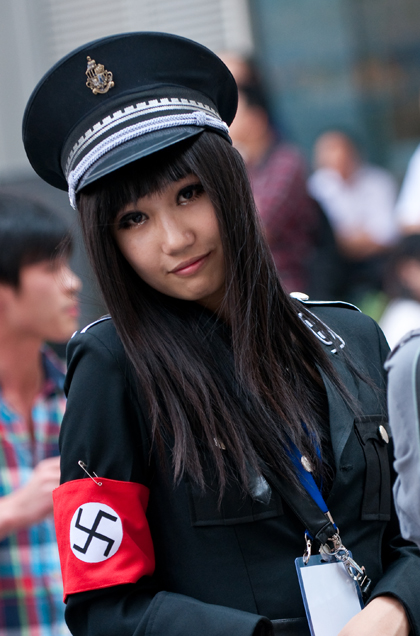
Nazi cosplay at World Cosplay Summit in Shanghai, 2011

Sometimes in East Asia, for example Japan, Nazi uniforms are used as part of cosplay. Several Japanese products have reused Nazi themes in their artwork, such as the 2010 card game Barbarossa, described as the "softcore Nazi anime porn" with "anime Nazi girls". The game was successful enough to receive an English release in 2013 as well as a stand-alone sequel El Alamein (also released in English). 2019 saw the release of Mein Waifu is the Fuhrer, a video game that has been described as a "Nazi-themed anime dating simulator". It draws inspiration from Japanese art and visual novels.

In South Korea, an area generally isolated from Nazi cultural influences during the Nazi era, Time magazine observed in 2000 "an unthinking fascination with the icons and imagery of the Third Reich."

In Indonesia, the SoldatenKaffee, a café featuring Nazi decoration and memorabilia closed in 2013, due to controversies and critiques by international media as well as death threats and hate mail to the owners. The SoldatenKaffee reopened in 2014. The owner claimed that his establishment never aimed to promote Nazi ideology, explaining that in Indonesia, Nazism was only seen "from a historical perspective". The SoldatenKaffee closed again in 2016 due to lack of local demand. Six months later, the owner's lawyer announced that the cafe would open in a new location with more space.

There is an ongoing interest in Thailand in Nazi symbolism, particularly among young people. The fascination with such imagery is considered to be based on a lack of understanding of the Holocaust rather than political leanings or hate crime. A Nazi-themed restaurant in Ubon Ratchathani was opened in 2011 called Hitler Fried Chicken, which gained considerable social media traction after an image of it was posted on Twitter. At this point, the restaurant had already changed its name to H-ler Food and Drink and censored Adolf Hitler's face on its store-front branding.

In 2006, a restaurant named Hitler's Cross was opened in Mumbai, India. It was later renamed after protests by the Indian Jewish community. 'Nazi Collection' Bedspread was launched, by a Mumbai-based home furnishing company in 2007. In 2007, in Gujarat a men's clothing store named Hitler was in the news. After the outrage, the owners claimed they did not know Adolf Hitler. In 2011, a pool parlour named Hitler's Den was opened in Nagpur. It included the Nazi swastika and insignia. The Israeli embassy in India expressed displeasure with the naming. The Simon Wiesenthal Center, an international Jewish human rights organisation, called for the parlour to be renamed. However, the owners refused.

== See also ==
- Aestheticization of politics
- Communist chic
  - Che Guevara in fashion
- Dimes Square
- List of chics
- Thor Steinar
- Helly Hansen
- Uniform fetishism
- Murderabilia
- World War II in popular culture
- Waffen-SS in popular culture

== Bibliography ==
- Sher, Julian; Marsden, William (2010). The Road to Hell: How the Biker Gangs are Conquering Canada. Knopf Canada. ISBN 978-0-307-36586-6.
