= Variations of the ichthys symbol =

Variation or parody of the Christian ichthys symbol

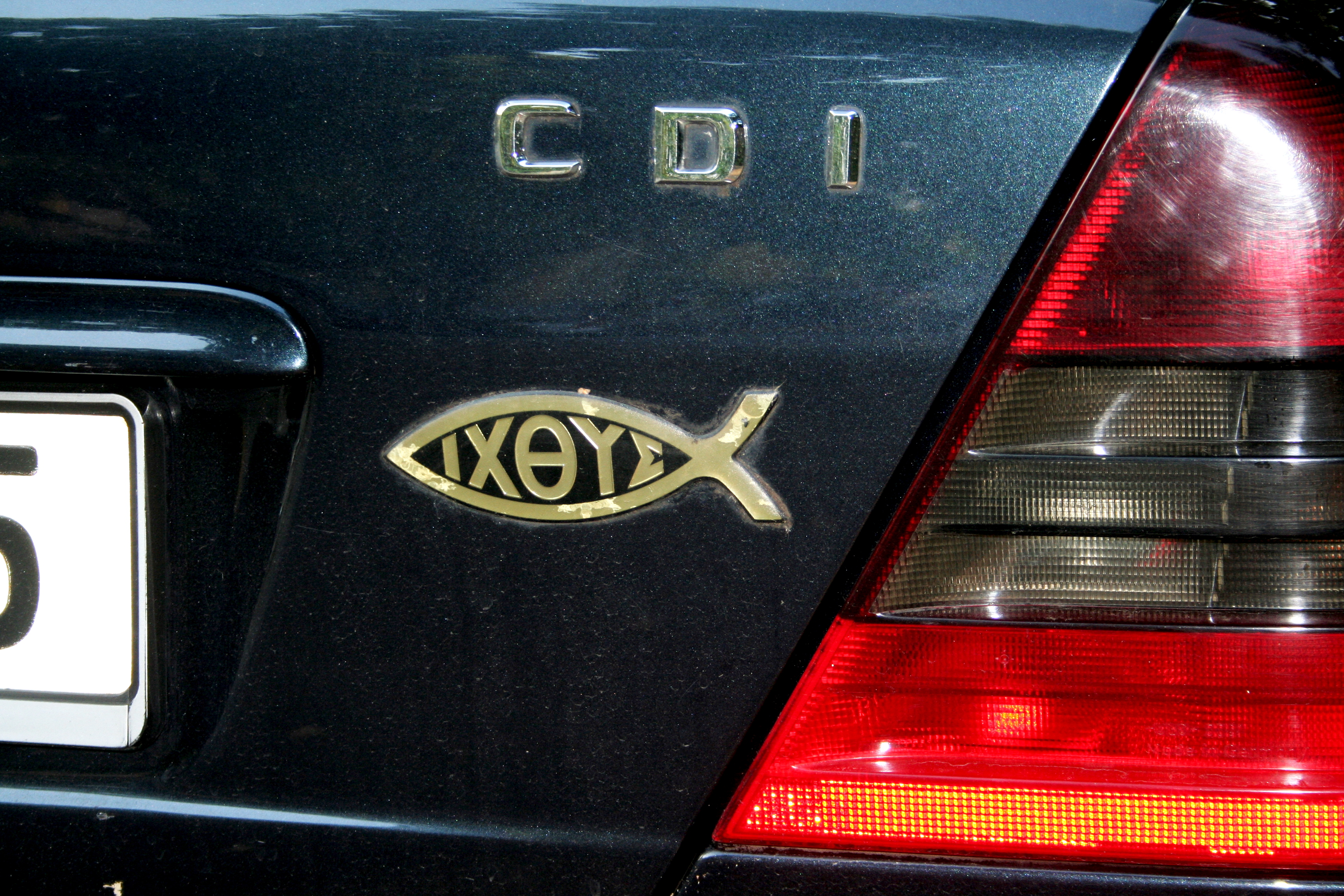
A modern ΙΧΘΥΣ ("ichthys") fish symbol on a car

An empty modern fish symbol

The ichthys symbol (or "Jesus fish") is a sign typically used to proclaim an affiliation with or affinity for Christianity. The fish was originally adopted by early Christians as a secret symbol, but the many variations known today first appeared in the 1980s. Some of these are made by Christians in order to promote a specific doctrine or theological perspective, such as evolutionary creation.

Both the traditional ichthys and its variations are found at religious goods stores and are used to adorn the bumpers or trunks of automobiles, often in the form of adhesive badges made of chrome-colored plastic.

Other variations are intended for the purpose of satire by non-Christian groups.

== Christian ichthys symbol ==
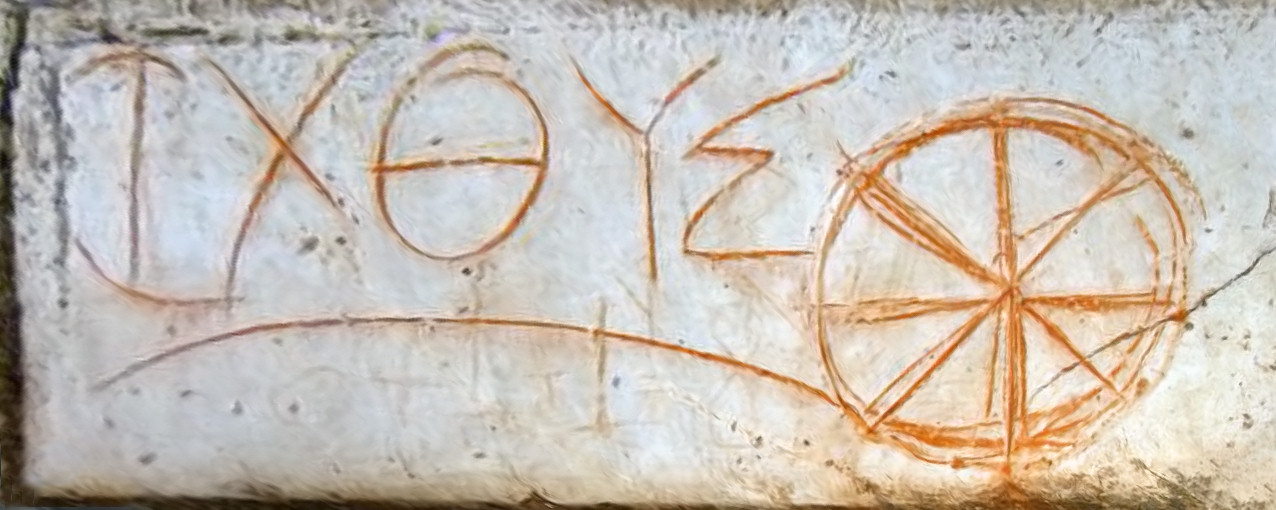
An ancient circular ichthys symbol, created by combining the Greek letters ΙΧΘΥΣ, Ephesus, 2nd century CE

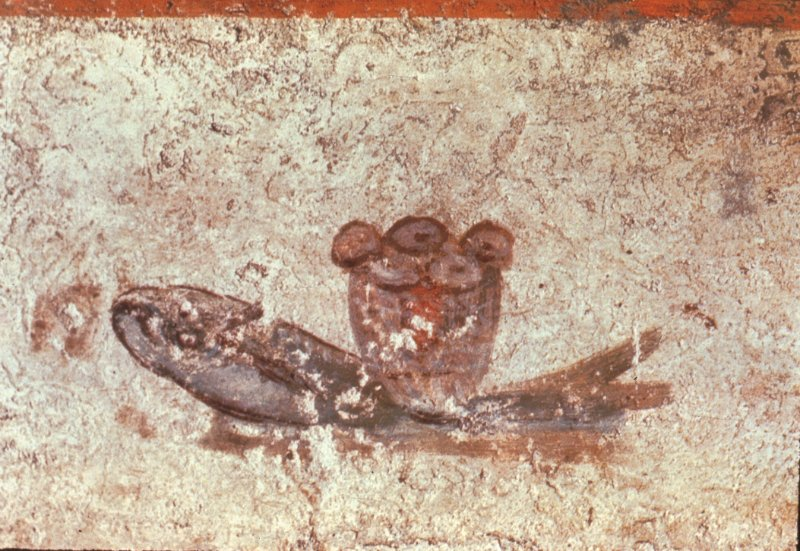
Eucharistic bread and fish, Catacombs of Rome

An ancient Hellenistic Christian slogan espoused the Greek acronym/acrostic ΙΧΘΥΣ (ichthys) for Ἰησοῦς Χριστός, Θεοῦ Υἱός, Σωτήρ (Iēsous Christos, Theou Yios, Sōtēr), which translates into English as 'Jesus Christ, Son of God, Saviour'; the Greek word ichthys translating to 'fish' in English. The first appearances of fish symbols as adopted in Christian art and literature date to the 2nd century AD. Some fish symbol variations, called the Jesus fish, contain the English word Jesus in the center, or are empty entirely.

Jeroen Temperman, with regard to the Jesus Fish, writes that:

It stands for or represents something other than itself, that something else being Jesus Christ. It is directed primarily at some audience that knows how properly to interpret the symbol. It is on one level a reference to our invocation of Christ's invitation in Matthew to become "fishers of men". But it incorporates additional means as well. The fish symbol is a pictorial representation of the Greek word Ichthys, which was itself used as an acronym for Iesous Christos, Theou Yios, Soter, meaning "Jesus Christ, God's Son, Savior". This was a secret symbol used by early Christians to help them identify one another without exposing themselves to their enemies.

In the early Church, the ichthys symbol held "the most sacred significance", and Christians used it to recognize churches and other believers through this symbol because they were persecuted by the Roman Empire. The ichthys symbol is also a reference to "the Holy Eucharist, with which the miracle of the multiplication of the loaves and fishes had such intimate connection both in point of time and significance." While many Christians hang a cross necklace or rosary inside their vehicles, "the fish sticker on the car is a more conscious symbol of a witnessing Christian--significantly, unlike the former, it is on the outside of the car for everyone to see".

Some Christian anarchists use an ichthys combined with an anarchist Circle-A as a symbol of their beliefs.

== Parodies ==
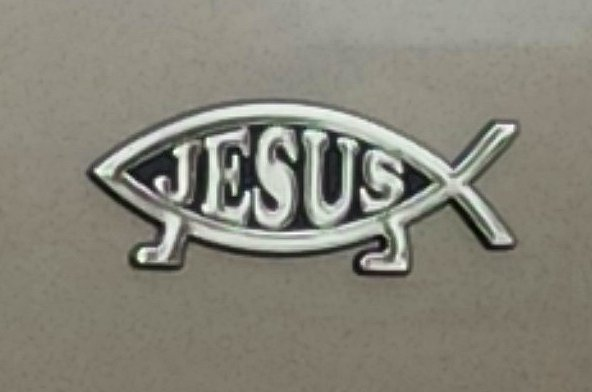
The "Darwin fish" is a popular parody variant of the ichthys, often displayed by atheists (top), and a Christian variation designed to promote evolutionary creation, the idea that biological evolution and a belief in a creator are compatible (bottom).

Jeroen Temperman states that there are "variations on this Ichthys symbol. Some variations add feet to the fish and inscribe 'Darwin' in the body. Others make reference to sushi, sharks, the food chain, fast food, the devil or death. How are we to interpret these variations? These adaptations are themselves susceptible to multiple interpretations, ranging from humour to critique, to mocking derision, to blasphemy." Among such parodies are the Darwin fish and the Gefilte fish, often displayed by atheists and Jews in the United States, and the "fish-hungry shark," displayed by Muslims in Egypt. People who see no conflict between Christian belief and the evidence of science regarding evolution have responded with decals from religious goods stores that depict a Jesus fish with feet representing evolutionary creationism. The scientist Wendee Holtcamp has been among the more prominent promoters of this image.

=== Darwin fish ===
Rhetorical scholar Thomas Lessl conducted a survey of users of the Darwin fish emblem. Based on their responses, he interprets the symbol as scientific "blackface", a parody that is one part mockery and one part imitation. Lessl suggests that the "various ideas that users plainly compress into this emblem are suggestive of scientism", and adds that the Darwin fish is an advertisement for the conflict thesis, an idea, which according to Lessl, is "now thoroughly discredited by historians".

Jonah Goldberg, in the Los Angeles Times criticized the Darwin fish, stating that:

I find the Darwin fish offensive. First there's the smugness. The undeniable message: Those Jesus fish people are less evolved, less sophisticated than we Darwin fishes. The hypocrisy is even more glaring. Darwin fish are often stuck next to bumper stickers promoting tolerance or admonishing random motorists that "hate is not a family value." But the whole point of the Darwin fish is intolerance; similar mockery of a cherished symbol would rightly be condemned if aimed at blacks or women or, yes, Muslims.

In the National Review, Goldberg further stated that "one of the problems with the Darwin Fish is that it assumes all Jesus Fishers are Creationists. And I agree that this is one of the problems. But it is not the only one. The 'evolve' fish, I think has a double-meaning in that it suggests Christians should evolve from Christianity. I also think mucking about with the symbol of the fish is itself offensive because the symbol is sacred and has no secular counterpart."

=== Artgemeinschaft ===
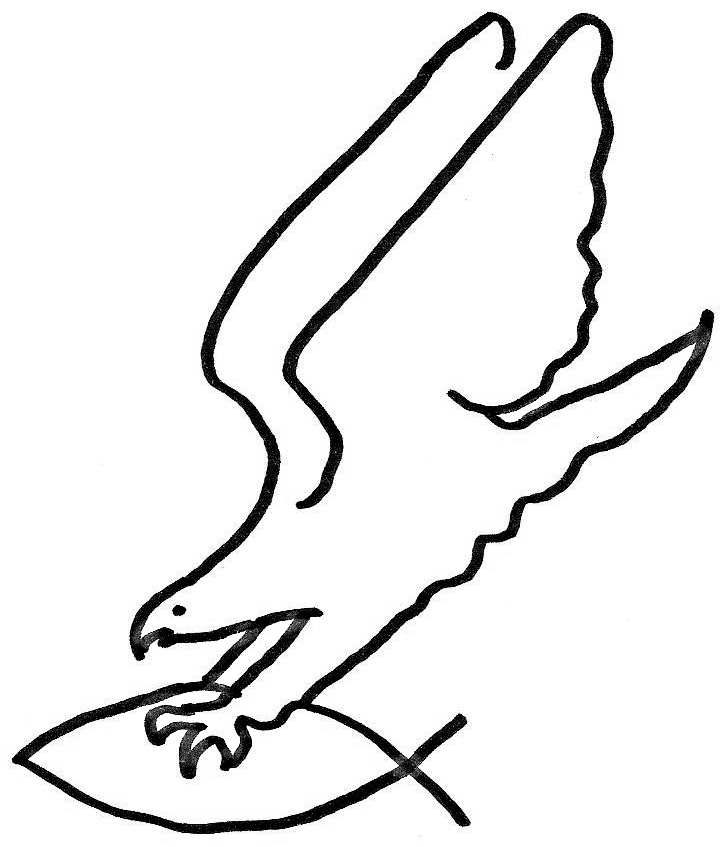
The "Eagle catching Fish" symbol used by the Artgemeinschaft racist anti-Christian neopagan group showing an eagle (representing paganism) catching an ichthys (representing Christianity)

The German Artgemeinschaft group, promoting racist neopaganism, uses a registered symbol showing an eagle catching an ichthys fish. This symbol, known as "eagle catching fish" (German: Adler fängt Fisch), was later used by other racist groups such as neo-Nazis in Germany. While the symbol was created and used by far-right pagan circles, not all groups that use it have far-right tendencies or are racist, though many do promote anti-Christian sentiment. In 2012, a coat of arms for the new district of Mecklenburgische Seenplatte was proposed, including the depiction of the eagle catching a fish that was previously used in the coat of arms of the former district of Müritz, which was one of the districts merged to create Mecklenburgische Seenplatte. The coat of arms was rejected for use after discovery of the fact that the "eagle catching fish" symbol was used by neo-Nazis, as they are treated with disdain in German public opinion with their symbols subsequently stigmatized (and for some symbols, banned altogether).

=== Fish-hungry sharks ===
In Egypt, many Coptic Orthodox Christians display the fish symbol on their vehicles as a sign of their faith, and Islamic fundamentalists responded with "fish-hungry sharks", some including the phrase "no god but Allah" within the body of the shark. One Egyptian Muslim was quoted in The Day as saying "The Christians had the fish so we responded with the shark. If they want to portray themselves as weak fishes, OK. We are the strongest."

=== Kissing ===
Another variation has been offered by people who see no conflict between Christian belief and the evidence of science regarding evolution: a depiction of the Jesus fish and the Darwin fish kissing. Such images have been sold as bumper stickers and have also been improvised. The writer Michael Dowd, author of the book Thank God for Evolution, has been among the more prominent promoters of this image.

== Gallery ==
An ichthys with the word "Truth" in it, eating a Darwin fish, portraying a version of Old Earth Creationism that rejects biological evolution

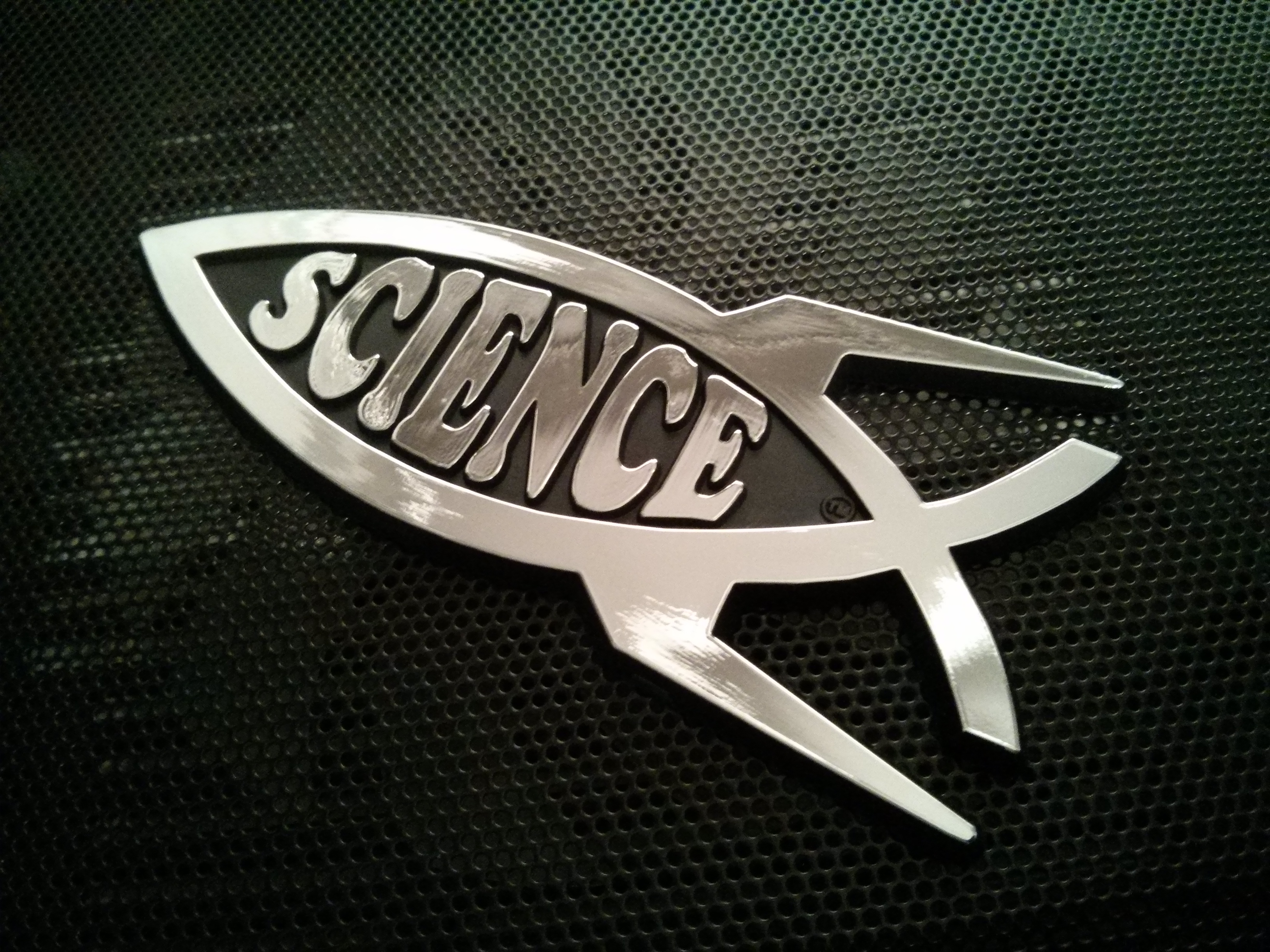
Science fish-rocket

"Trek Fish", reportedly designed by Eugene "Rod" Roddenberry Jr.

Flying Spaghetti Monster emblem

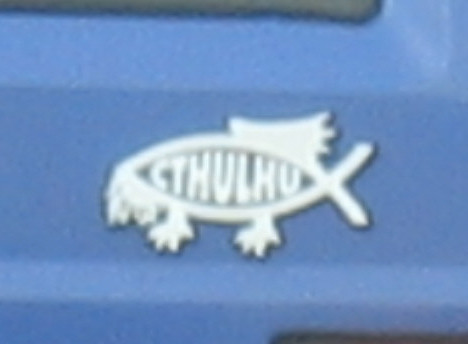
Cthulhu depicted in a parody of the ichthys bumper ornament

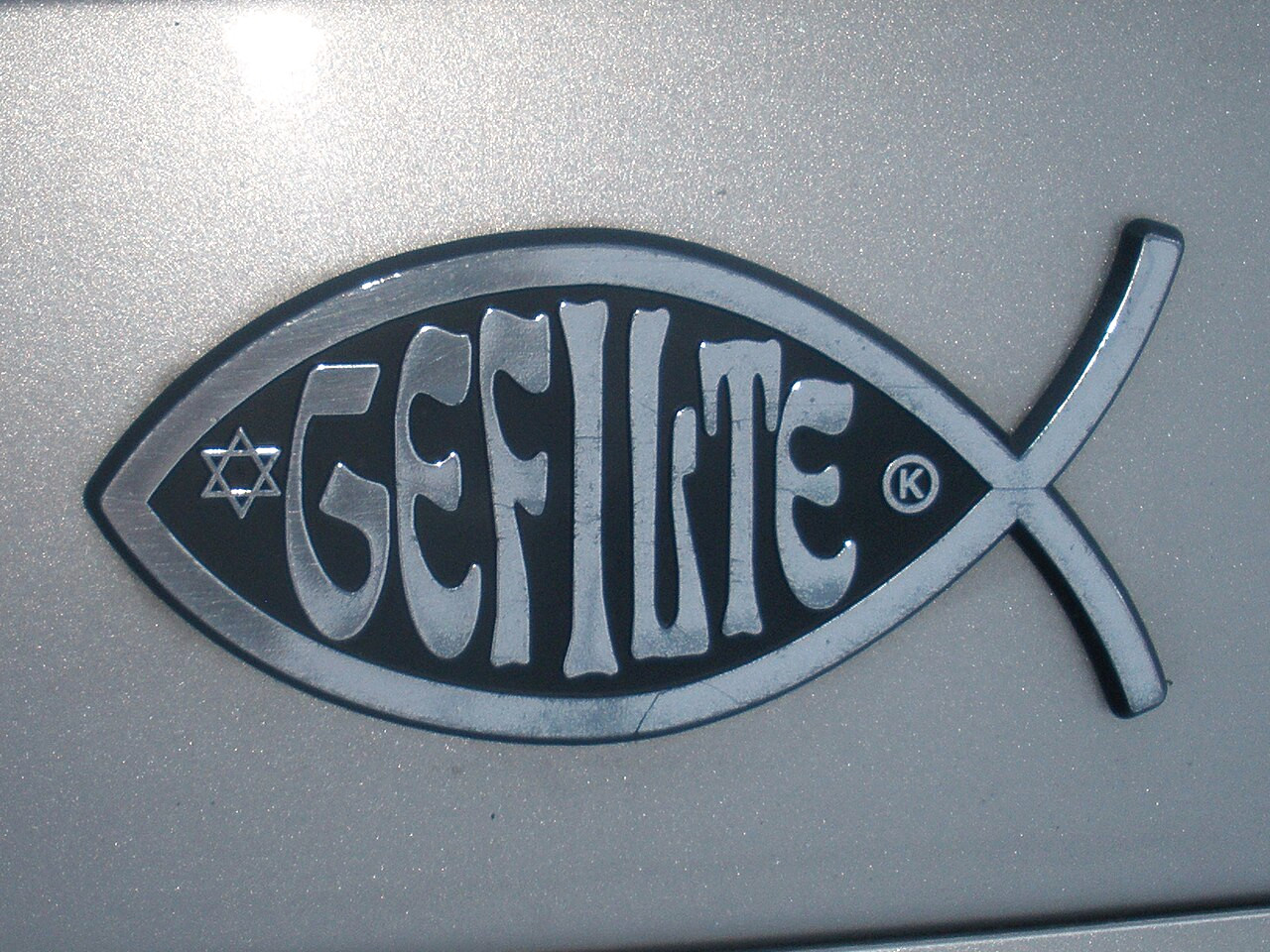
"Gefilte fish" bumper ornament

Headless ichthys

Hooked ichthys
