= Communist chic =

Elements of popular culture based on Communist symbols

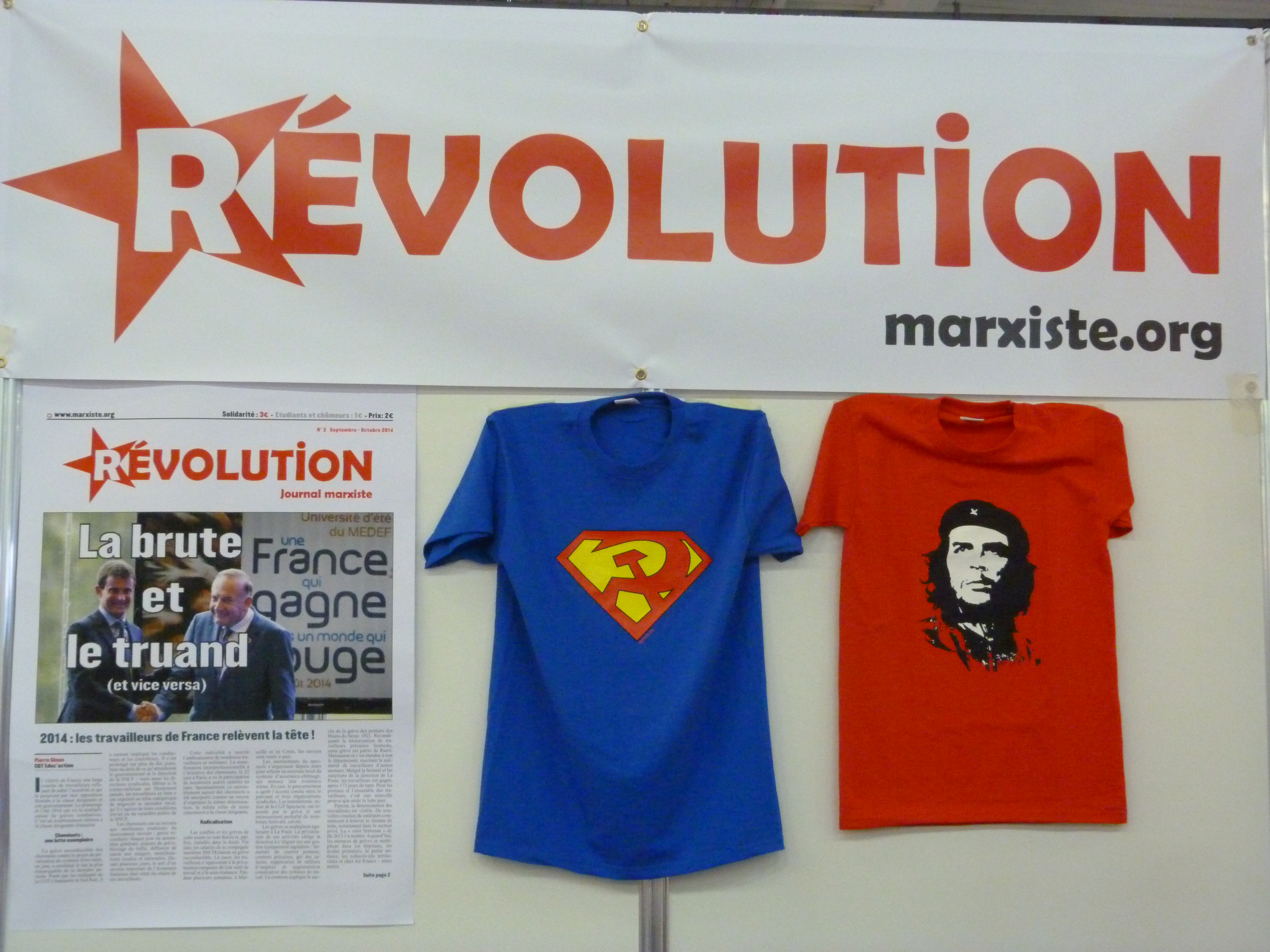
Communist chic clothing for sale at the Fête de l'Humanité event in France in 2014.

Communist chic are elements of popular culture such as fashion and commodities based on communist symbols and other things associated with Marxism, Leninism, socialism and communism. Che Guevara in fashion is an example; T-shirts and other memorabilia with Alberto Korda's iconic photo of Che Guevara.

Journalists Christine Esche and Rosa Mossiah argue that in former communist countries, communist chic originates from disappointment in capitalist society.

The trend gained some momentum with the 150th anniversary of The Communist Manifesto in 1998. A 'Modern Edition' was released in New York City that year, and style expert Simon Doonan viewed the book as a desirable fashion accessory regardless of its contents. She argues "People are forgetting the Gulag and Stalin and the negative imagery ... it could be time for it to come back as pure style."

== See also ==
- Che Guevara in fashion
- Communist nostalgia
- Nostalgia for the Soviet Union
- Ostalgie
- Capitalist realism
- Nazi chic
- Radical chic
