= Nazi memorabilia =

Items originated from Nazi Germany

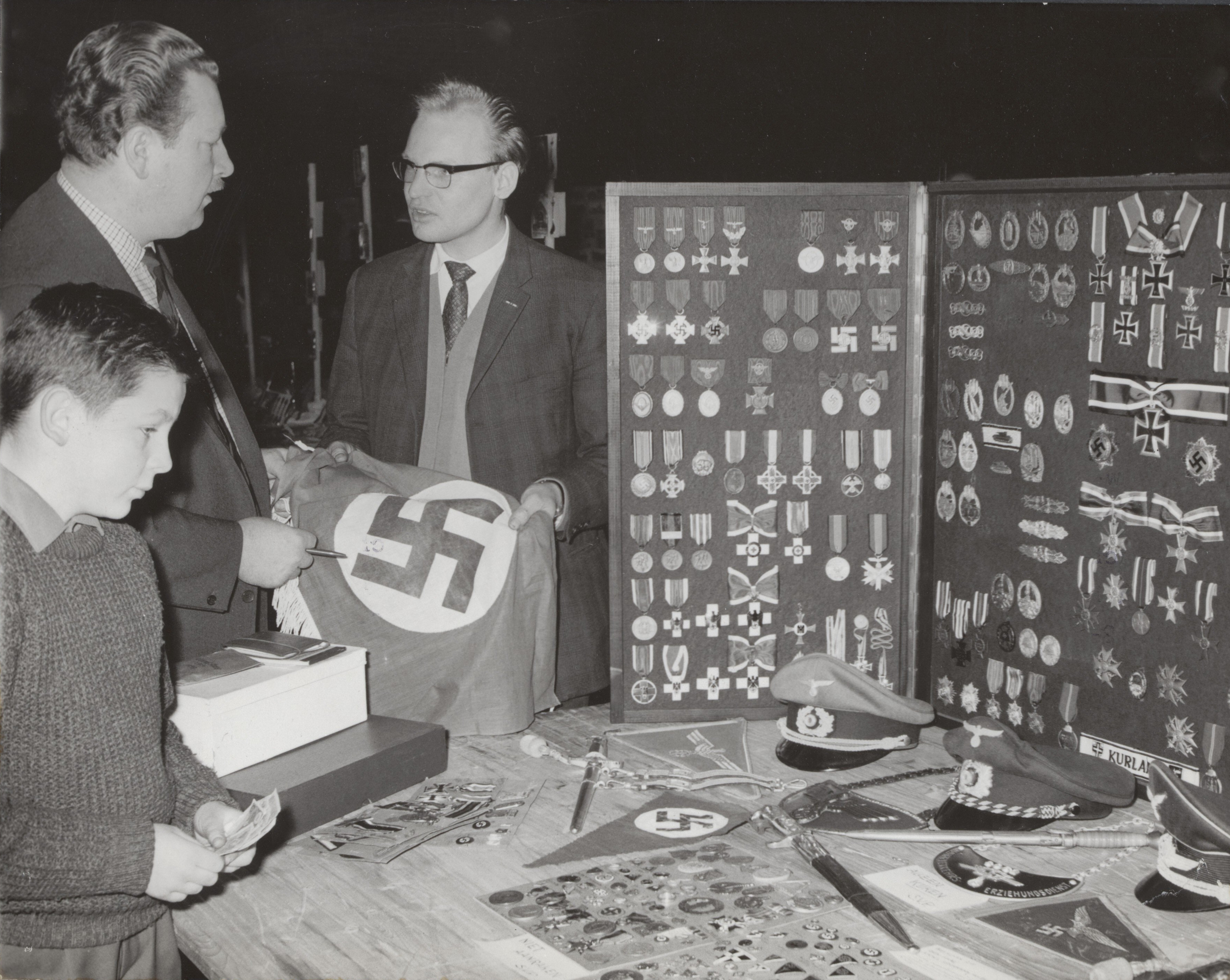
Militaria and paraphernalia from Nazi Germany for sale as memorabilia and collectibles in Amsterdam, the Netherlands in 1964. Today, internationally based private collectors and traders more often are handling artifacts with a troubled past online.

Nazi memorabilia are items produced during the height of Nazism in Germany, particularly the years between 1933 and 1945. Nazi memorabilia includes a variety of objects from the material culture of Nazi Germany, especially those featuring swastikas and other Nazi symbolism and imagery or connected to Nazi propaganda. Examples are military and paramilitary uniforms, insignia, coins and banknotes, medals, flags, daggers, guns, posters, contemporary photos, books, publications, and ephemera.

During the Second World War, soldiers from opposing Allied forces often took small items from fallen enemies as war trophies. These and other items from this time period have since been acquired by museums and individual collectors. In Europe museums still regularly receive everyday artifacts from the Nazi era and have to deal with remnants of National Socialism.

== Market ==
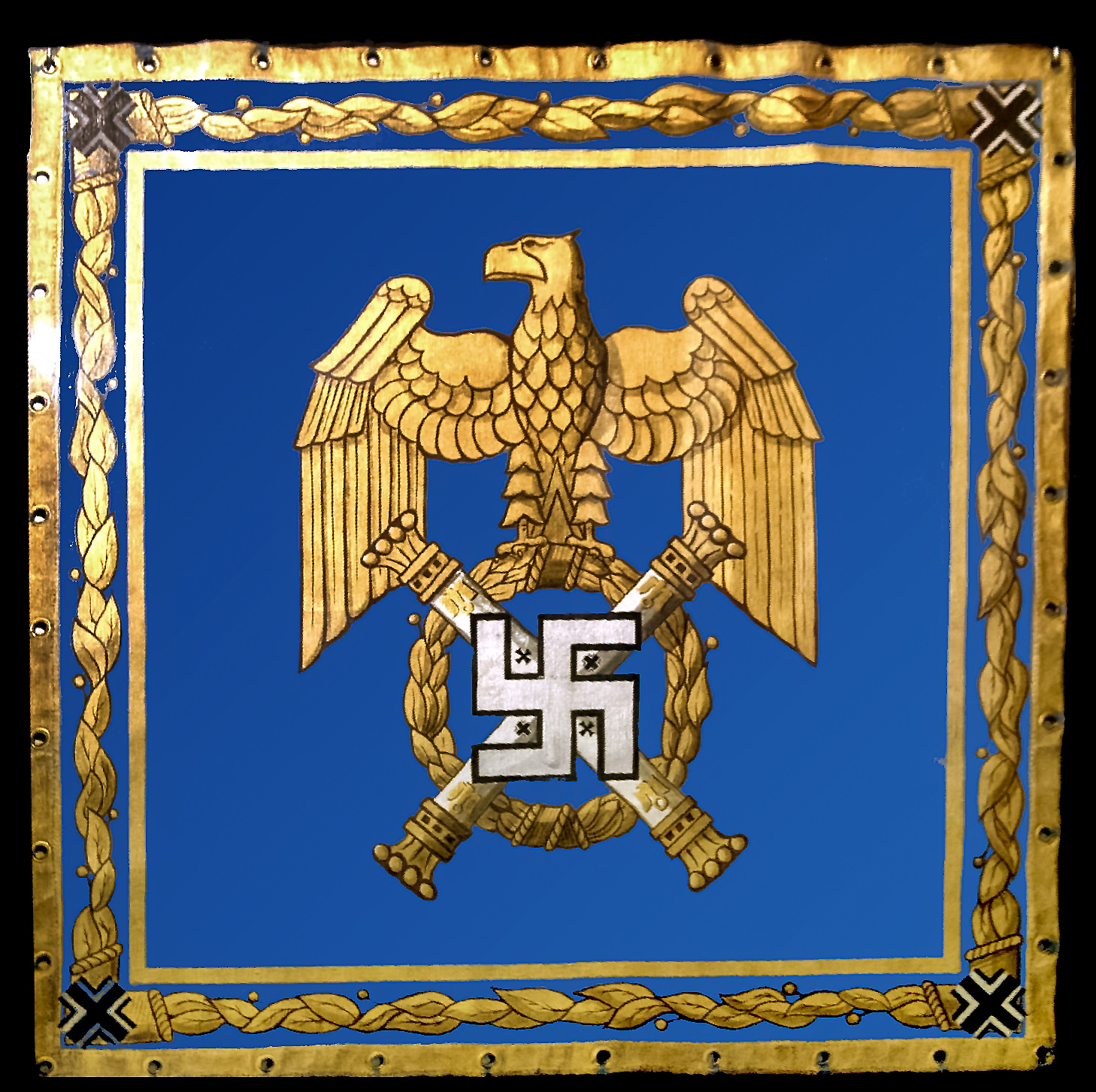
Nazi uniform accessories taken as war trophies on display in Fort Lewis Military Museum in Washington, USA: Nazi Party uniform insignia (collar patches and cap badges), party membership pin, parade belt buckle, Nuremberg Rally badges, etc.

In recent years the market for buying and selling Nazi memorabilia has increased. As veterans pass away, some families have tried to get rid of their possessions.

Many in the general public are offended by, and condemn, auctions, militaria shops, online stores and other businesses selling Nazi 'antiques', and find the goods and commercial trading 'tasteless' and 'hateful'. However, many of those wanting to restrict the trade of Nazi collectibles will accept donations to public museums. While many private collectors are exclusively interested in the historical background and fascinated by the distinctive design of the items, some collectors are in fact political supporters of Neo-Nazism and other hate groups.

With the growing demands for Nazi memorabilia, many Jewish groups are disapproving the sale and purchase of Nazi products for leisure purposes. Others such as Haim Gertner, director of Israel's Holocaust memorial Yad Vashem, believe that some of the Nazi memorabilia are worth saving, claiming that anti-Semitic history shouldn't be forgotten.

As original items from the Nazi era and Second World War are sold for high prices, there is a large amount of copies, forgeries and even inauthentic objects on the market.

== Legal restrictions ==
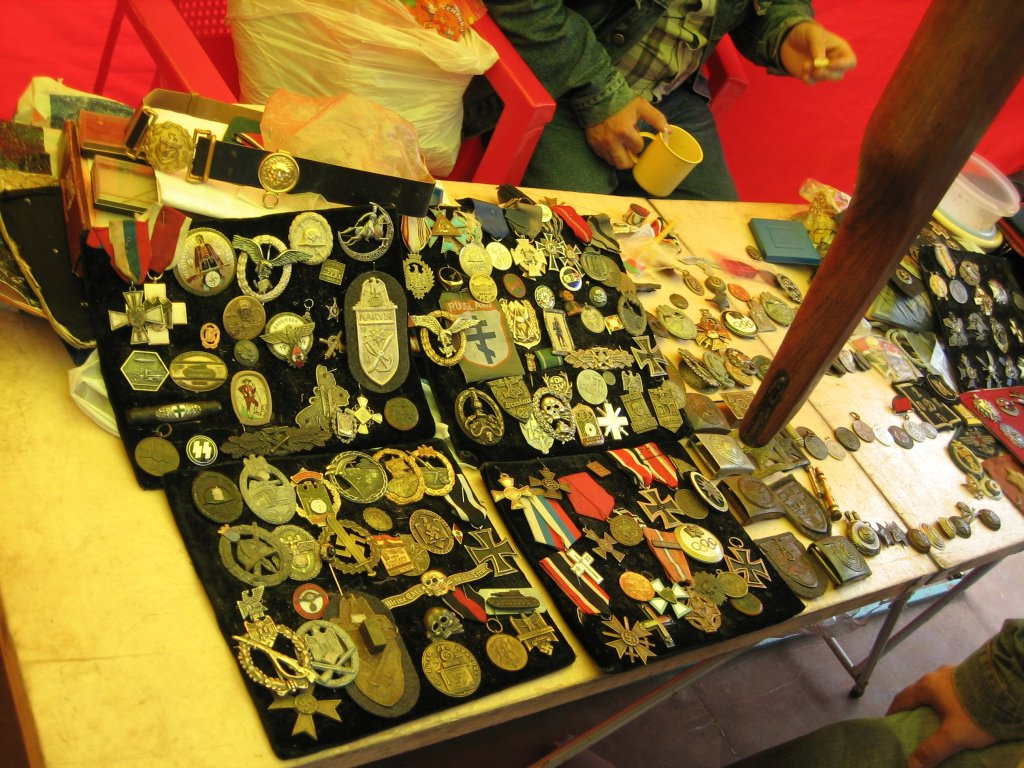
Nazi decorations, medals and badges in a trade stall in the Izmaylovsky Park in Moscow, Russia, 2006. While original items from the Nazi era are sold for high prices, there are a large amount of copies and forgeries on the market.

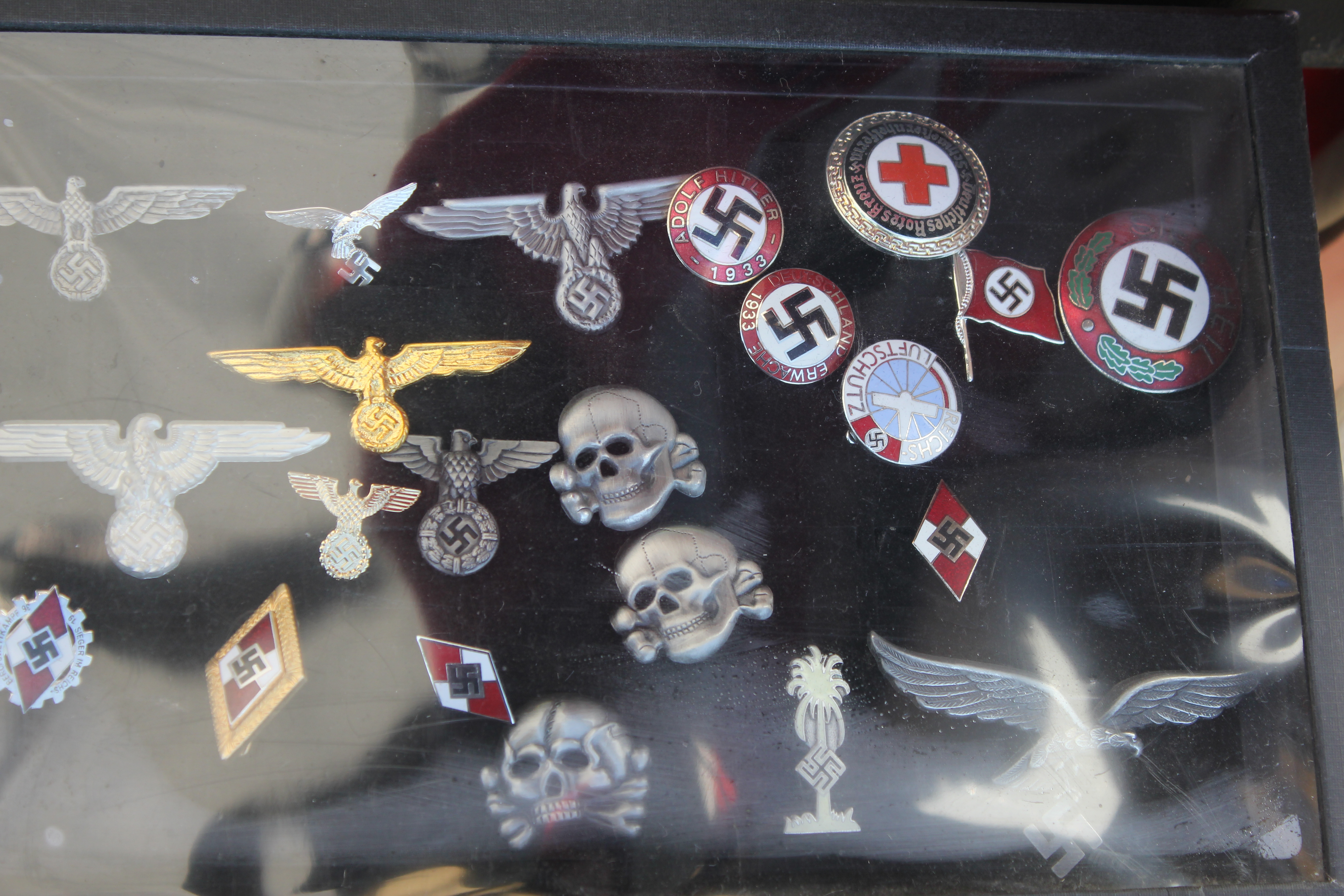
Modern day replicas of miscellaneous Nazi badges aimed at reenactors and exhibitions, for sale at the militaria fair at the Victory Show in Cosby, Leicestershire, UK, 2015: Wehrmacht eagle-and-swastika cap badges, SS skull-and-crossbones emblems (Totenkopf), Nazi Party membership pins, etc.

The sale of Nazi memorabilia is strictly prohibited in some parts of Europe. In France, the Internet portal site Yahoo! was sued in the case LICRA v. Yahoo! (2000) by the Union of Jewish Students and the International League against Racism and Anti-Semitism for "justifying war crimes and crimes against humanity" by allowing such memorabilia to be sold via its auction pages. Yahoo!'s response was to ban the sale of Nazi memorabilia through its website. A Paris court cleared Yahoo! in 2003.

Fearing similar litigation, auction website eBay enacted new guidelines regarding the sale of Nazi memorabilia in 2003. eBay's policies prohibit items relating to Nazi media propaganda, items made after 1933 that contain a swastika, Nazi reproduction items such as uniforms, and all Holocaust-related products. Memorabilia such as coins, stamps, or printed period literature such as magazines, books, or pamphlets are not prohibited.

== Examples ==
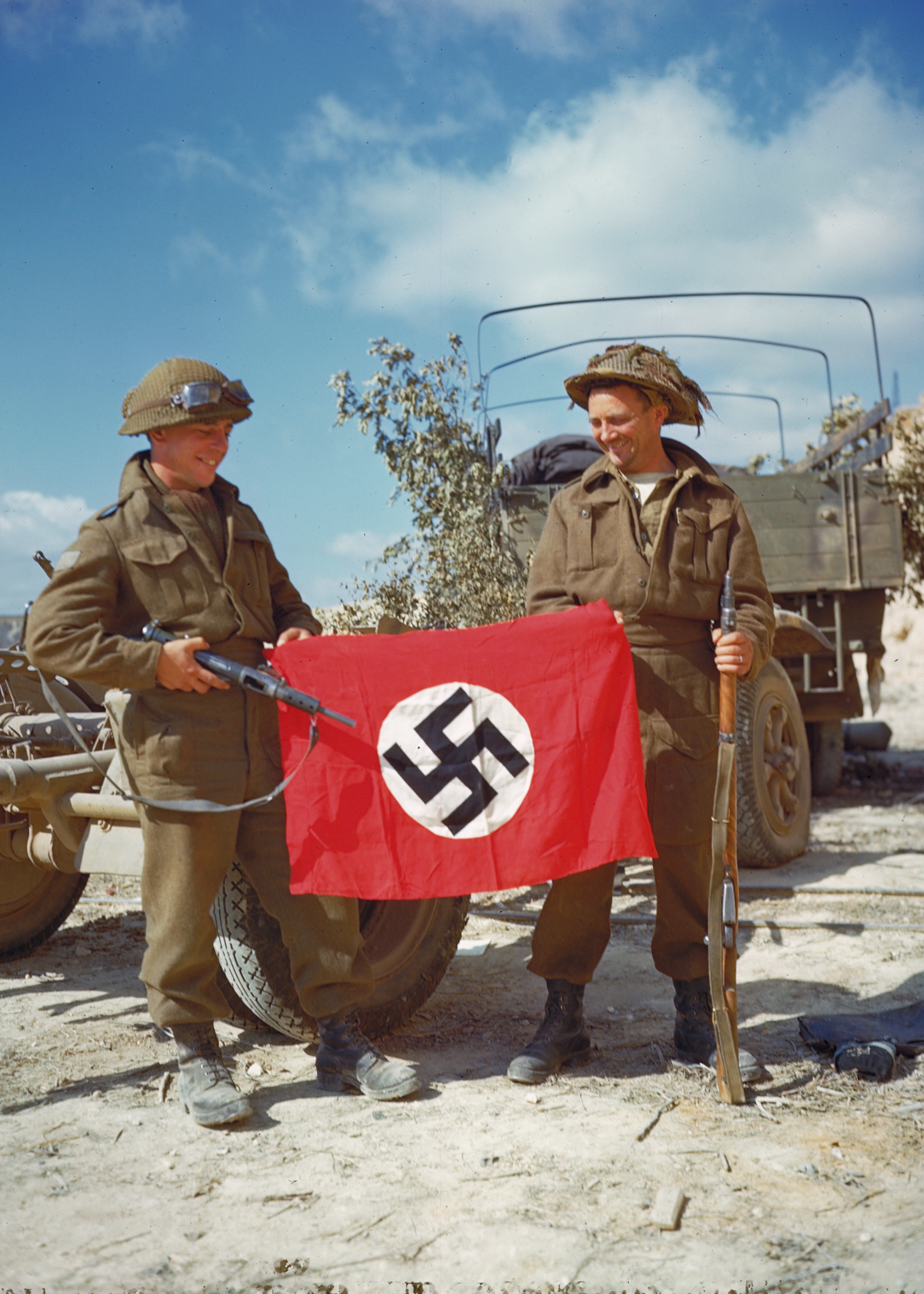
Canadian soldiers during Operation Overlord showing a captured Nazi flag as a war trophy outside Hautmesnil, France in August 1944.
Photo: National Archives of Canada

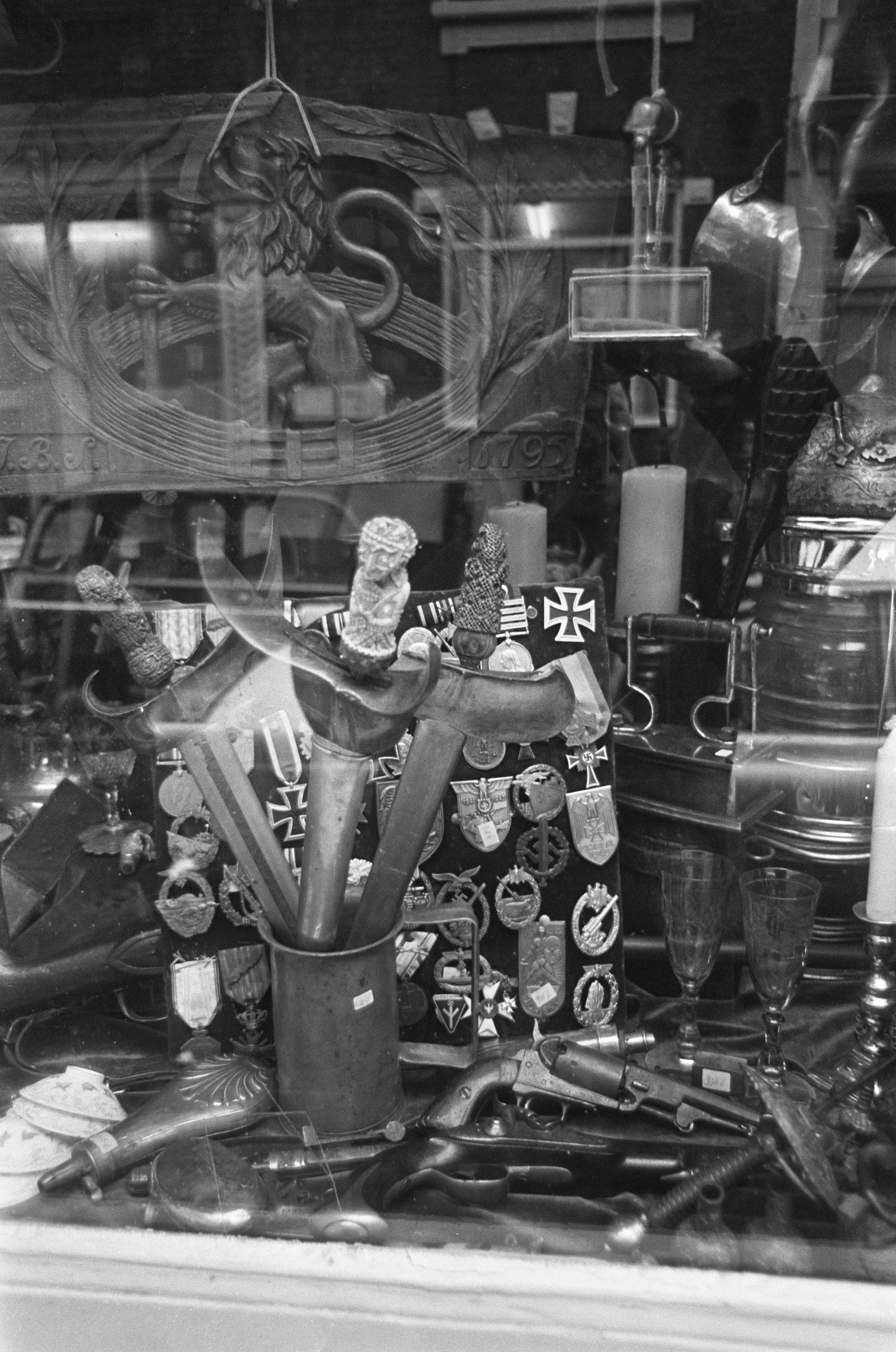
Nazi awards etc. in an antique and militaria shop in the Netherlands 1966
Photo: Jack de Nijs / Anefo

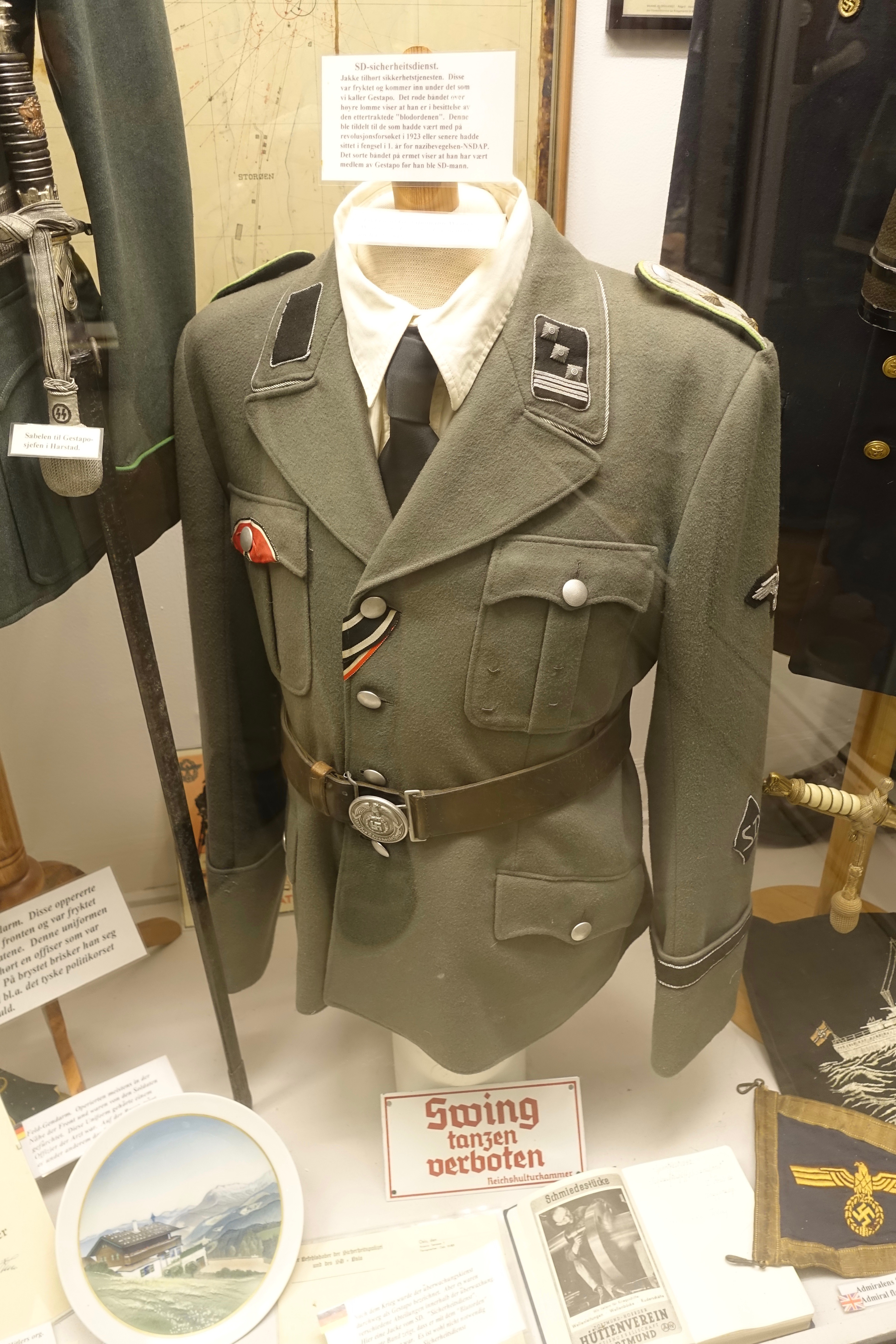
Nazi era artifacts in the Lofoten Krigsminnemuseum, Norway: A genuine SS uniform used in German occupied Norway during World War II and a (probably) fake "Swingtanzen verboten" sign.

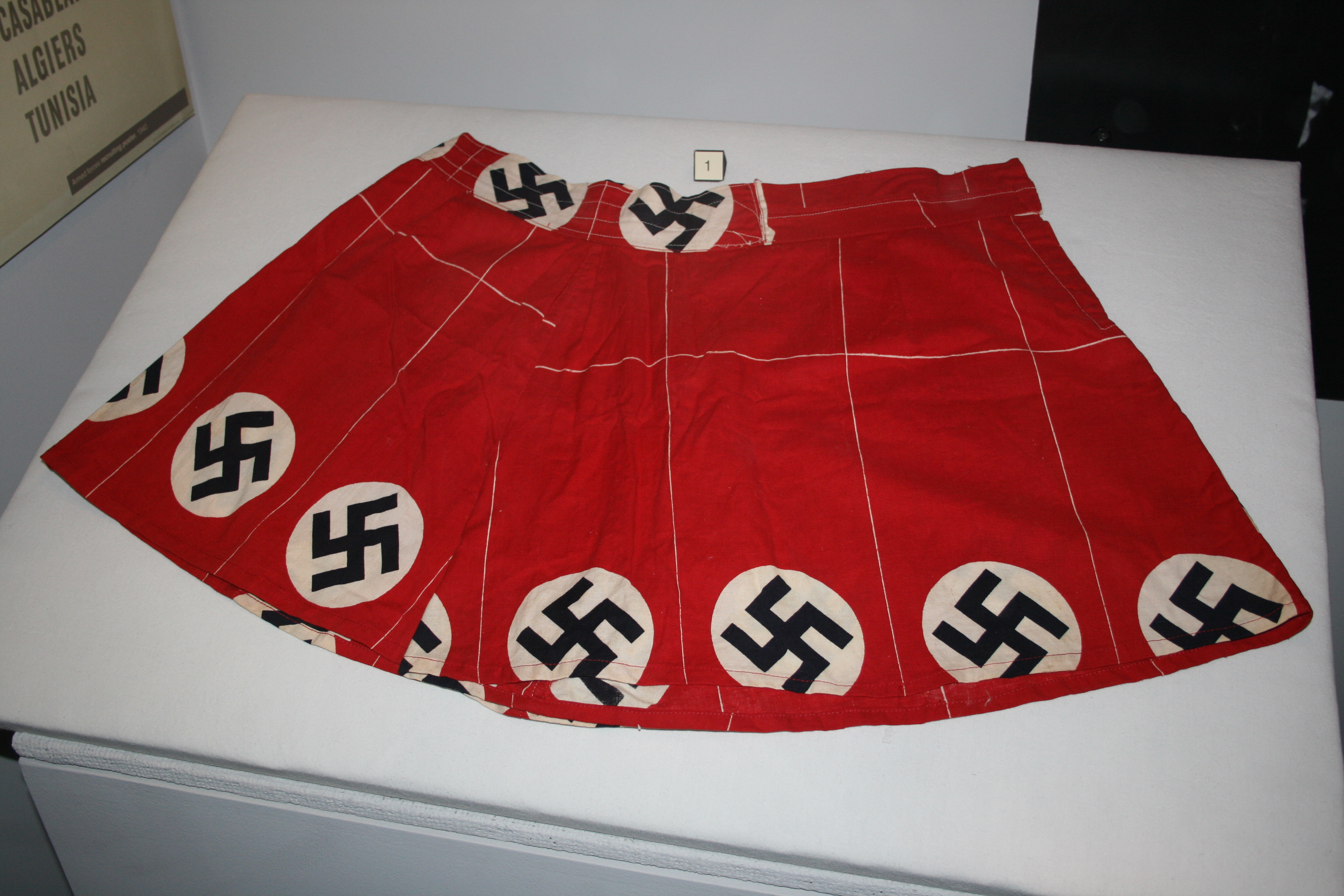
Fabric intended for swastika armbands brought home as an American soldier's personal World War II souvenir and made into a swimsuit in 1950 as an expression of disrespect. Exhibit on display in the North Carolina Museum of History.

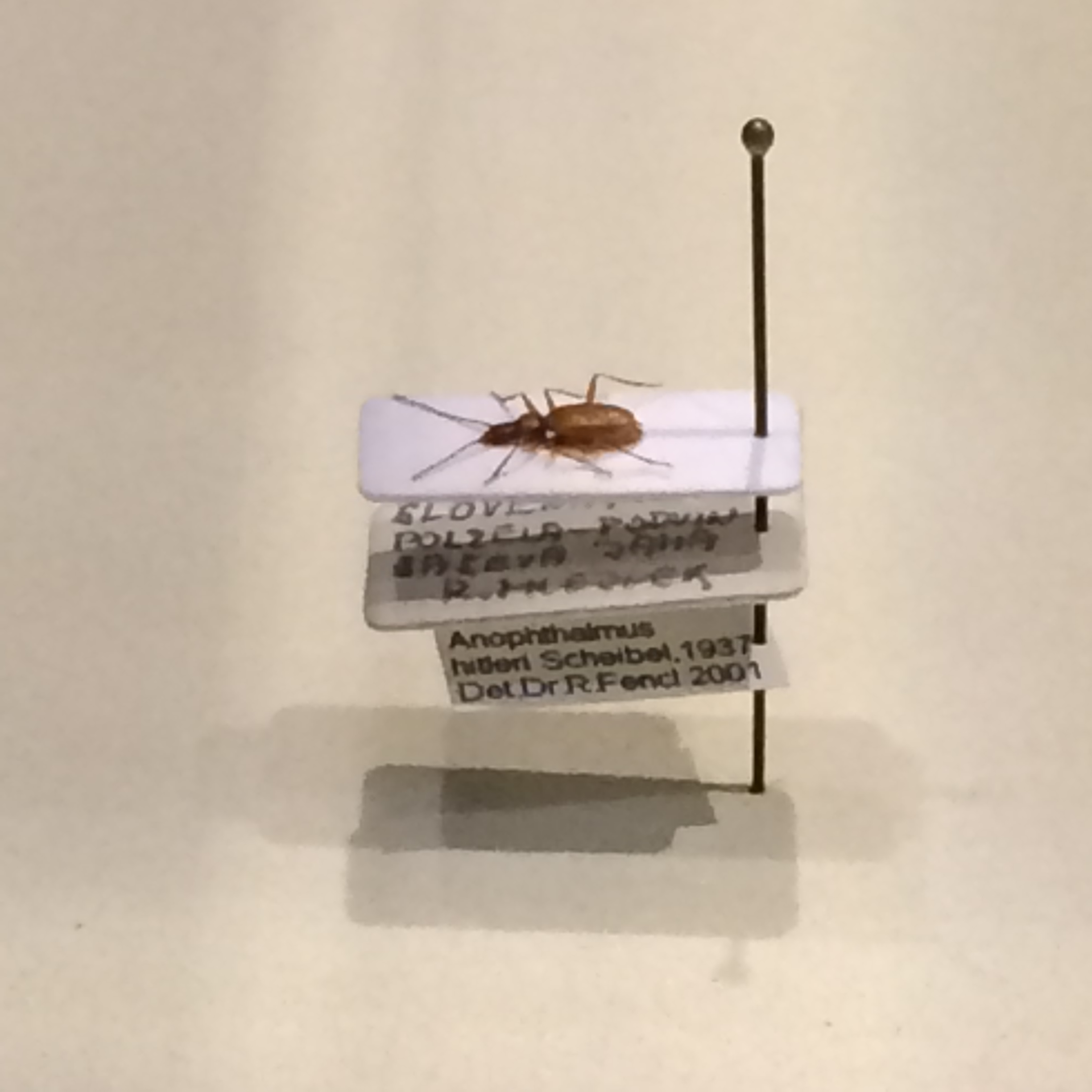
The eyeless 'Hitler beetle' (Anophthalmus hitleri), named after Hitler in 1933, is of interest to collectors purely because of its name and therefore in danger of extinction.

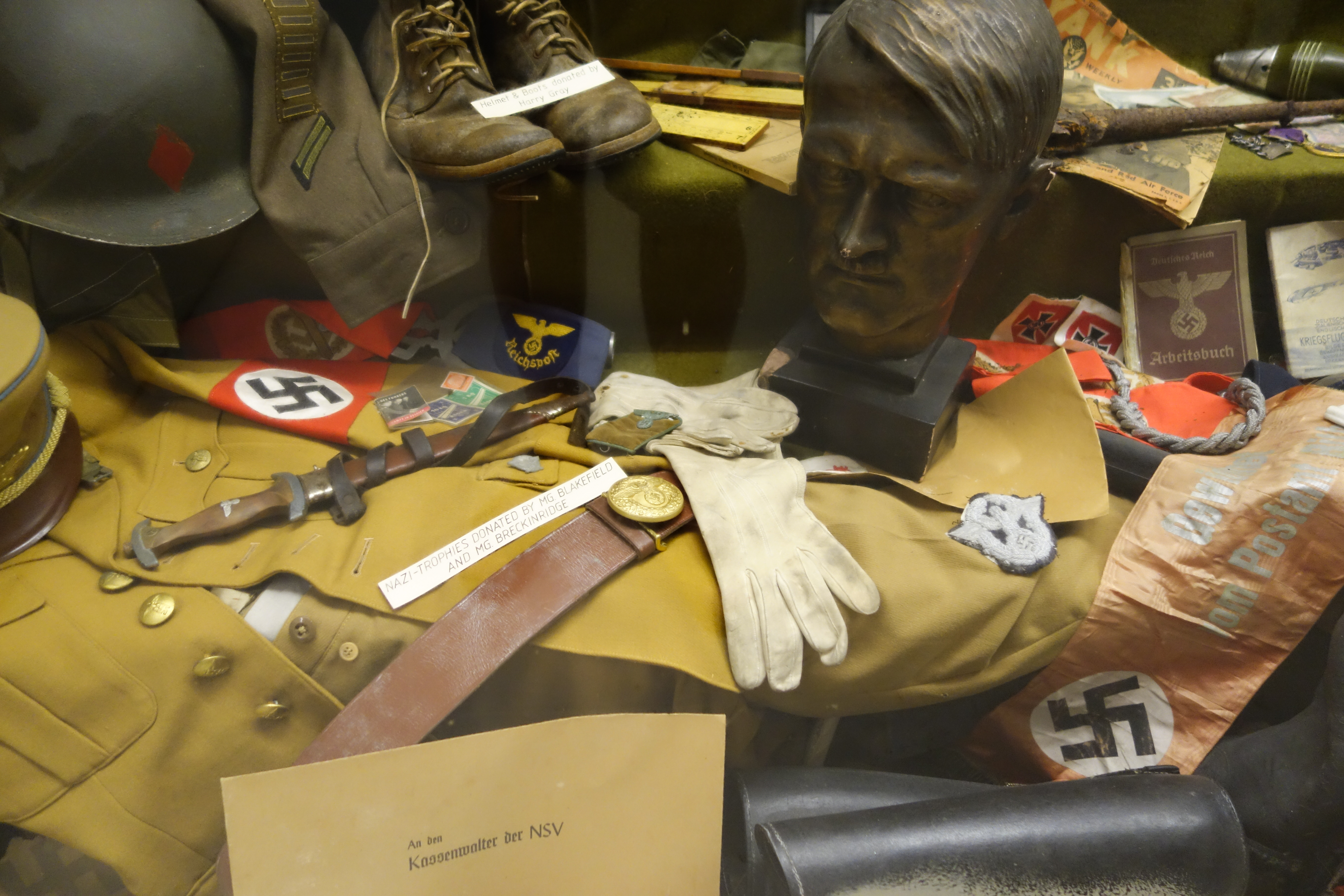
Nazi paraphernalia and propaganda items on display at the National Museum of Military History in Luxembourg: a uniform for a 'Political leader' in the Nazi Party, Nazi swastika armband, Reichspost badge, portrait bust of Adolf Hitler, Ordnungspolizei sleeve badge, Deutsches Reich Arbeitsbuch, SA dagger, etc.
Photo: Thomas Quine, 2015

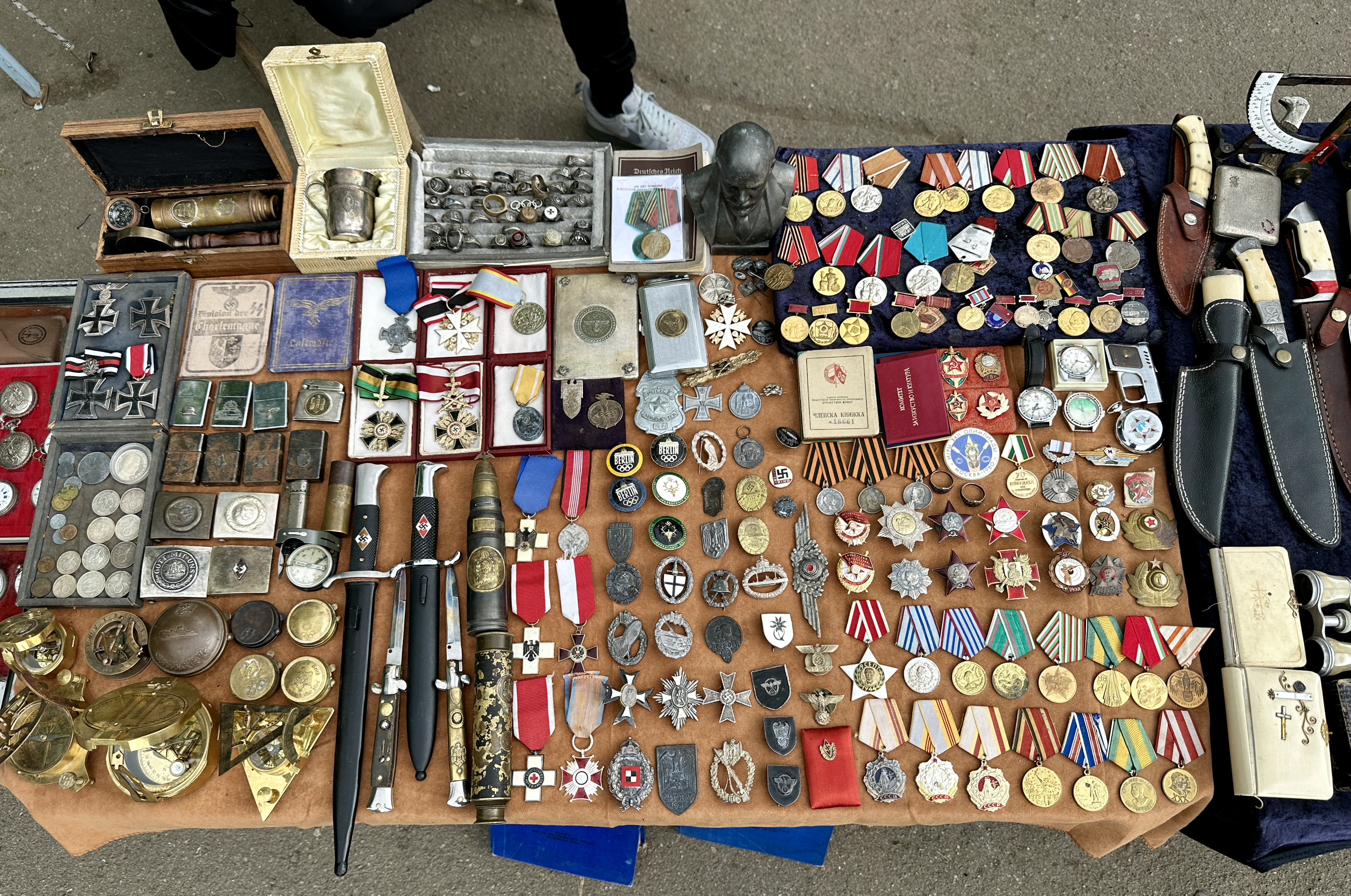
Replica and fake Nazi and Communist awards and other vintage collectibles for sale at a street market in central Sofia, Bulgaria in 2024.

== See also ==
- Militaria
- Nazi propaganda
- Nazi symbolism, Bans on Nazi symbols
- Orders, decorations, and medals of Nazi Germany, Political decorations
- Nazi uniforms and insignia: Nazi Party, SS, SA, Army, Navy, Air force, Paramilitary ranks
- Reichszeugmeisterei, national material control office of Nazi Germany
- Art in Nazi Germany
- Paintings by Adolf Hitler
- War trophy
- Nazi exploitation (Nazisploitation)
- Nazi chic, the use of Nazi-era style, imagery, and paraphernalia in clothing and popular culture
- Nazi imagery in Thailand
- Murderabilia
- Waffen-SS in popular culture
- Memorabilia, Paraphernalia, Collecting
- Neo-nazism
