= Anti-Christian sentiment =

Discrimination against Christianity or Christians

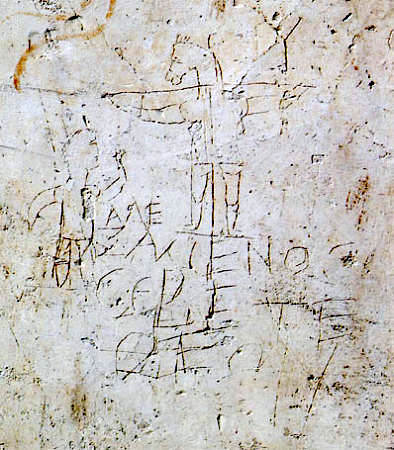
Anti-Christian graffiti from the Roman Empire. The text reads "ΑΛΕ ΞΑΜΕΝΟϹ ϹΕΒΕΤΕ ΘΕΟΝ" ("Alexamenos worships his god").

Anti-Christian sentiment is the opposition to or hostility toward Christianity or Christian values. The presence of anti-Christian sentiment has led to the persecution of Christians throughout history.

Christianophobia or Christophobia are terms also used to describe anti-Christian sentiment.

In January 2026, the European Parliament recognized the term "Christianophobia" for the first time in an annual human rights and democracy resolution. Lawmakers highlighted an institutional imbalance, noting that while the EU Commission has an appointed coordinator to combat Islamophobia, no equivalent exists for Christianophobia.

== Antiquity ==
Evidence shows that anti-Christian sentiment was already present as early as the Roman Empire during the first century AD. The steady growth of the Christian movement was viewed with suspicion by both the authorities and the people of Rome leading to the persecution of Christians in the Roman Empire.

During the second century, Christianity was viewed as a negative movement in two ways: both due to accusations made against adherents of the Christian faith in accordance with the principles held by the Roman population, and because of the supplementary controversy aroused during the intellectual age.

Anti-Christian sentiment is alluded to in the New Testament, and appears to have been anticipated thus by Jesus of Nazareth, being documented by the writers of the gospels. Furthermore, anti-Christian sentiment of the first century was not expressed by the Roman authorities alone, but also by the Jews. As Christianity was, at that time, a sect which was largely emerging from Judaism, much of this sentiment was the result of anger from the well established Jewish faith towards a new and revolutionary faith. Paul of Tarsus, who persecuted Christians before himself becoming a Christian, highlighted the Crucifixion of Jesus as a 'stumbling block' to the Jews: the belief that the messiah would have died on a cross was offensive to some of the Jews because they awaited a messiah who had different characteristics.

== Middle Ages ==
On the subject of historical anti-Christian sentiments of early Muslims, professor Sidney H. Griffith explains that "The cross and the icons publicly declared those very points of Christian faith which the Quran, in the Muslim view, explicitly denied: that Christ was the Son of God and that he died on the cross." For that reason, "the Christian practice of venerating the cross and the icons of Christ and the saints often aroused the disdain of Muslims". Because of that, there was an ongoing "campaign to erase the public symbols of Christianity [in formerly Christian lands such as Egypt and Syria], especially the previously ubiquitous sign of the cross. There are archaeological evidences of the destruction and defacement of Christian images [and crosses] in the early Islamic period due to the conflict with Muslims they aroused."

The initial expansion of the Islamic Caliphate brought large Christian populations under Muslim rule. The legal framework of the Pact of Umar defined the status of Christians as dhimmis ("protected people"). While this granted them the right to practice their faith, it was contingent upon the payment of the jizya (tax levied on non-muslims) and adherence to restrictive social codes, during which Christians were forbidden from building or repairing churches, displaying crosses, sounding bells, riding horses or camels, bearing arms, taking Muslim names, and using Arabic in religious documents, and were required to yield seats to Muslims, and attach demeaning images to their doors, among other regulations. Early anti-Christian sentiment was often expressed through theological refutation. Scholars such as Al-Jahiz wrote polemics like Al-Radd 'ala al-Nasara ("Refutation of the Christians"), criticizing Christians for their perceived social "haughtiness" and intellectual influence in the Abbasid court. He argued that their doctrine of the Trinity was a logical contradiction and a form of shirk (associating partners with God).

The prominent Andalusian jurist Ibn Rushd decreed that "golden crosses must be broken up before being distributed" (as plunder). "As for their sacred books [Bibles], one must make them disappear", he added. (He later clarified that unless all words can be erased from every page in order to resell the blank book, all Christian scripture must be burned.) An anti-Christian treatise published in Al-Andalus was titled "Hammers [for breaking] crosses."

The Persian poet Mu'izzi urged the grandson of Alp Arslan to root out and wipe out all Christians in the world in an act of genocide:

For the sake of the Arab religion, it is a duty, O ghazi king, to clear the country of Syria of patriarchs and bishops, to clear the land of Rum [Anatolia] from priests and monks. You should kill those accursed dogs and wretched creatures... You should... cut their throats... You should make polo-balls of the Franks' heads in the desert, and polo sticks from their hands and feet"

Marco Polo, who journeyed throughout the East in the 13th century and made an observation of the people of Arabia, stated that "The inhabitants are all Saracens [Muslims], and utterly detest the Christians", and "indeed, it is a fact that all the Saracens in the world are agreed in wishing ill to all the Christians in the world".

== Early modern period ==
At the time of the Reformation, anti-Christian sentiment grew with the rise of atheism. During the Reign of Terror, a period of the French Revolution, radical revolutionaries and their supporters desired a cultural revolution that would rid the French state of all Christian influence. In 1789, church lands were expropriated and priests killed or forced to leave France. Later in 1792, "refractory priests" were targeted and replaced with their secular counterpart from the Jacobin club. Anti-Christian sentiment increased during 1793 and a campaign of dechristianization occurred, and new forms of moral religion emerged, including the deistic Cult of the Supreme Being and the atheistic Cult of Reason. The drownings at Nantes targeted many Catholic priests and nuns. The first drownings happened on the night of 16 November 1793. The victims were 160 arrested Catholic priests that were labeled "refractory clergy" by the National Convention.

== Late modern period ==
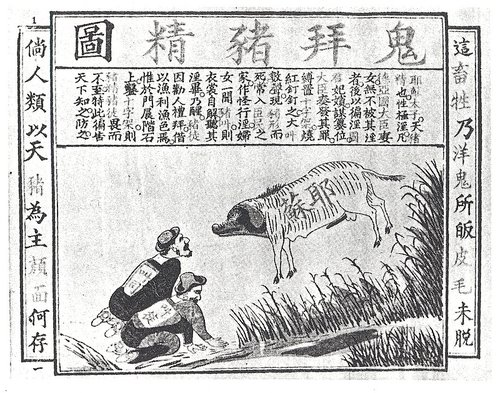
Anti-Western pamphlet issued in China during the Boxer Rebellion, depicting Jesuit missionaries (derogatorily labelled as ghosts) bowing down before a pig, as the Chinese word for pig (猪, pronounced zhū), sounded similar to the word for 'Lord' (主, pronounced zhǔ) used by Chinese Christians.

In China, during the Ming and Qing dynasties, particularly in the late Qing period, "教案" (anti-missionary incidents) were frequent. During the Taiping Rebellion, Qing official Zeng Guofan, in his "Proclamation Against the Cantonese Bandits" (《讨粤匪檄》), equated the God Worshipping Society with Catholicism. This led those who hated the Taiping Rebellion to direct their resentment towards Catholicism. The Boxer Rebellion saw attacks on Christians and the destruction of churches. According to official Chinese statistics, "from 1840 to 1900, there were over 400 anti-missionary incidents across China.

William Kingdon Clifford was outspoken about Christianity as a drag on progress. He was personified by Mr. Saunders in the novel The New Republic by W. H. Mallock in 1878. For example, ‘All our doubts on this matter,’ said Mr. Saunders, ‘are simply due to that dense pestiferous fog of crazed sentiment that still hides our view, but which the present generation has sternly set its face to dispel and conquer. Science will drain the marshy grounds of the human mind, so that the deadly malaria of Christianity, which has already destroyed two civilisations, shall never be fatal to a third.’

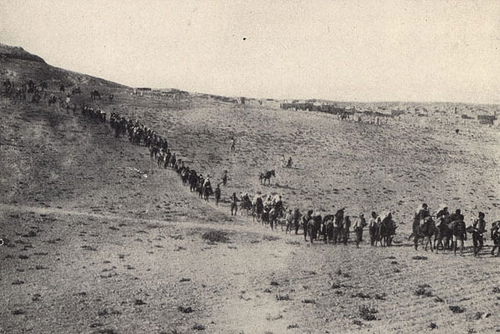
Christians fleeing their homes in the Ottoman Empire, c. 1922. Many Christians were persecuted and/or killed during the Armenian genocide, Greek genocide, and Assyrian genocide.

When British writer Charles Montagu Doughty journeyed around Arabia, the local Bedouins said to him, "Thou wast safe in thine own country, though mightest have continued there; but since thou art come into the land of the Moslemin [Muslims], God has delivered thee into our hands to die—so perish all the Nasara [Christians]! And be burned in hell with your father, Sheytan [Satan]." Doughty also records how Muslims in Arabia would, while circling around the Kaaba, supplicate Allah to "curse and destroy" the Jews and Christians.

Many Christians were persecuted and/or killed during the Armenian genocide, Greek genocide, and Assyrian genocide. Benny Morris and Dror Ze'evi argue that the Armenian genocide and other contemporaneous persecution of Christians in the Ottoman Empire (Greek genocide, and Assyrian genocide) constitute an extermination campaign, or genocide, carried out by the Ottoman Empire against its Christian subjects.

The Affair of the Cards was a political scandal which broke out in 1904 in France, during the Third French Republic. From 1900 to 1904, the prefectural administrations, the Masonic lodges of the Grand Orient de France and other intelligence networks established data sheets and created a secret surveillance system of all army officers in order to ensure that Christians would be excluded from promotions and advancement in the military hierarchy, and "free-thinking" officers would be promoted instead.

The Cristero War was a widespread struggle in central and western Mexico in response to the implementation of secularist and anticlerical articles. The rebellion was instigated as a response to an executive decree by Mexican President Plutarco Elías Calles to strictly enforce Article 130 of the Constitution, a decision known as Calles Law. Calles sought to eliminate the power of the Catholic Church in Mexico, its affiliated organizations and to suppress popular religiosity. To help enforce the law, Calles seized Church properties, expelled foreign priests, and closed monasteries, convents, and religious schools. Some have characterized Calles as the leader of an atheist state and his program as being one to eradicate religion in Mexico. Tomás Garrido Canabal led persecutions against the Church in his state, Tabasco, killing many priests and laymen and driving the remainder underground.

The First Portuguese Republic was intensely anti-clerical. Under the leadership of Afonso Costa, the Minister of Justice, the revolution immediately targeted the Catholic Church; the provisional government began devoting its entire attention to an anti-religious policy. On 8 October the religious orders in Portugal were expelled, and their property was confiscated. On 10 October – five days after the inauguration of the Republic – the new government decreed that all convents, monasteries and religious orders were to be suppressed. All residents of religious institutions were expelled and their goods were confiscated. The Jesuits were forced to forfeit their Portuguese citizenship. A series of anti-Catholic laws and decrees followed each other in rapid succession.

The Red Terror in Spain committed various acts of violence that included the desecration and burning of monasteries, convents, and churches. The failed coup of July 1936 set loose a violent onslaught on those that revolutionaries in the Republican zone identified as enemies; "where the rebellion failed, for several months afterwards merely to be identified as a priest, a religious, or simply a militant Christian or member of some apostolic or pious organization, was enough for a person to be executed without trial".

Although Nazi Germany never officially proclaimed a Kirchenkampf against Christian churches, top Nazis freely expressed their contempt for Christian teachings in private conversations. Nazi ideology conflicted with traditional Christian beliefs in various respects – Nazis criticized Christian notions of "meekness and guilt" on the basis that they "repressed the violent instincts necessary to prevent inferior races from dominating Aryans". Aggressive anti-church radicals like Alfred Rosenberg and Martin Bormann saw the conflict with the churches as a priority concern, and anti-church and anti-clerical sentiments were strong among grassroots party activists. Hitler himself disdained Christianity, as Alan Bullock noted:

In Hitler's eyes, Christianity was a religion fit only for slaves; he detested its ethics in particular. Its teaching, he declared, was a rebellion against the natural law of selection by struggle and the survival of the fittest.

Throughout the history of the Soviet Union (1917–1991), there were periods when Soviet authorities suppressed and persecuted various forms of Christianity to different extents depending on State interests. The state advocated the destruction of religion, and to achieve this goal, it officially denounced religious beliefs as superstitious and backward. The Communist Party destroyed churches, ridiculed, harassed, incarcerated and executed religious leaders, flooded the schools and media with anti-religious teachings, and introduced a belief system called "scientific atheism", with its own rituals, promises and proselytizers. According to some sources, the total number of Christian victims under the Soviet regime has been estimated to range around 12 to 20 million. At least 106,300 Russian clergymen were executed between 1937 and 1941.

== Contemporary ==
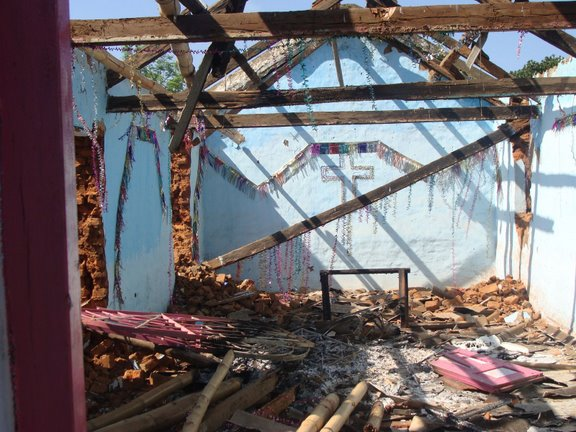
Remains of a church property burnt down during 2008 Kandhamal violence in Orissa, India, in August 2008

Following the Chinese Communist Revolution, the Chinese Communist Party (CCP) targeted Christians in antireligion campaigns and expelled Christian missionaries from the People's Republic of China during the Cultural Revolution. After the country's reform and opening-up policy, restrictions on Christianity were somewhat relaxed. However, Christians are still viewed with suspicion by the Chinese Communist Party (CCP) authorities and are considered "outsiders" in Chinese society. Christians who refuse to join the government-established Chinese Catholic Patriotic Association and Three-Self Patriotic Movement and instead attend "underground churches" and house churches frequently face crackdowns and persecution.

During Christmas, police are often stationed at church entrances. Since 2016, a rumor that the Eight-Nation Alliance invented Christmas has circulated online in China annually before Christmas. Despite being debunked, this rumor is widely shared on WeChat and reappears online each year.

When broadcasting television programs from Hong Kong and Macau via digital TV, China does not air programs with Christian content, instead replacing them with other material.

Persecution of Christians in the post–Cold War era has been taking place in Africa, the Americas, Europe, Asia and Middle East since 1989. Native Christian communities are subjected to persecution across many Muslim-majority countries such as Egypt and Pakistan. The persecution of Christians in North Korea is ongoing and systematic. According to the Christian organization Open Doors, North Korea persecutes Christians more than any other country in the world.

The issue of Christianophobia was considered by the UK parliament on 5 December 2007 in a Westminster Hall Commons debate. Likewise, the issue was raised by the European Parliament in a resolution on 21 January 2026, which regretted that a European coordinator to combat Christianophobia had not yet been appointed, despite its recognition of ongoing "severe persecution".

Some people, such as actor Rainn Wilson, who is not a Christian himself, have argued that Hollywood has often expressed anti-Christian bias. Actor Matthew McConaughey has stated that he has seen Christians in Hollywood hiding their faith for the sake of their careers.

According to Nigerian NGO, Intersociety, between 2009 and 2026 no fewer than 128,750 Christians were killed in Nigeria and at least 19,500 churches were burned down or otherwise forcibly closed by Islamists.

Starting in June 2021, over 68 Christian churches were desecrated, damaged, or destroyed across Canada. Officials speculated that the fires and other acts of vandalism were reactions to the reported discovery of unmarked graves at Canadian Indian residential school sites (primarily run by Christian churches) in May 2021.

The Trump administration has considered anti-Christian bias a significant issue within the US federal government. Trump announced in February 2025 that he would create a task force on targeting anti-Christian bias within federal agencies, and tasked Attorney General Pam Bondi with leading it. Despite Trump's claims of eradicating anti-Christian bias, the Interfaith Alliance has recorded dozens of "attacks on faith communities" by the Trump administration, most of which have targeted Christian groups, especially Catholics and Lutherans.

The popular rise of religious Zionism in recent decades has resulted in increased systematic violence against Christians in Israel, including attacks such as harassment, aggression, and physical assault on Christians, particularly in Jerusalem. Since the beginning of the Gaza war, Israeli settler and military attacks in the Palestinian territories have increasingly targeted Palestinian Christians and churches.

== See also ==
- Anti-Catholicism
- Anti-Mormonism
- Anti-Protestantism
- Crypto-Christianity
- List of cases of church arson
- Persecution of Christians
  - Persecution of Christians in China
  - Persecution of Eastern Orthodox Christians
  - Persecution of Jehovah's Witnesses
  - Persecution of Christians in the post–Cold War era
  - Persecution of Christians in the Roman Empire
  - Persecution of Christians in the Soviet Union
  - Violence against Christians in India
- Eagle catching fish
