= Artgemeinschaft =

Banned neo-Nazi organization in Germany

Artgemeinschaft Germanic Faith Community Artgemeinschaft Germanische Glaubens-Gemeinschaft
- Abbreviation: AG GGG
- Leader: Jürgen Rieger (1989–2009)
- Founder: Wilhelm Kusserow
- Founded: 1951
- Banned: September 2023
- Newspaper: Nordische Zeitung
- Ideology: Neo-Nazism; Neo-fascism; Esoteric Nazism
- Political position: Far-right
- Religion: Germanic Neopaganism

Website
- web.archive.org/web/20230831004232/https://asatru.de/ (last archieved version August 2023)

The Artgemeinschaft Germanic Faith Community (German: Artgemeinschaft Germanische Glaubens-Gemeinschaft; abbreviated AG GGG) was a German Neopagan and neo-Nazi organization founded in 1951 by Wilhelm Kusserow, a former member of the SS. In 1983, it merged with the Nordungen (founded in 1924). From 1989 to 2009, it was headed by Jürgen Rieger. In September 2023, the Federal Ministry of the Interior banned the Association.

The group had the legal status of a German registered association (eingetragener Verein) headquartered in Berlin. At the time of the ban AG, GGG had 300 supporters and 40 core members.

== Ideology and history ==
The Artgemeinschaft is one of the toughest structures in the extreme right-wing. It doesn't shut itself off from right-wing terrorism at all. The Artgemeinschaft runs under the label of nature-religiousness and ancestral commemoration. But the Artgemeinschaft is actually one of the most conspiratorial – and I would say – most dangerous structures that we have in Germany.

— Andrea Röpke, Right-wing extremism analyst

The Artgemeinschaft was founded in 1951 by former Nazi Wilhelm Kusserow. It was a registered association since 1957 and was based in Berlin. From 1989 until his death in 2009, the group was led by the neo-Nazi lawyer Jürgen Rieger. His successor was Axel Schunk from Stockstadt in Bavaria.

Artgemeinschaft mixed far-right ideology with Nordic and Teutonic religions such as Ásatrú, but also elements of atheism. In the 1960s some theosophic and so-called ariosophic aspects were added.

The group was xenophobic and antisemitic. A belief of the party is Artgemeinschaft (loosely translated as "racial community"), a basic tenet of which is the Artglaube ("racial belief").

In contrast to other pagan organisations, neither Guido von List nor Lanz von Liebenfels plays any role.

Important in their beliefs are theses by Schopenhauer, Nietzsche, Eduard von Hartmann and Feuerbach in order to attack Christian morality and to replace it with a pagan one. According to Fromm, belief in Gods is not important for the Artgemeinschaft.

One symbol used by Artgemeinschaft is an eagle catching a Christian fish, known as "Adler fängt Fisch" or "Adler fängt Ichthys", which symbolises the rejection of Christianity. It was registered as a trademark for the group in 2003, leading to neo-Nazis in Germany using the symbol afterwards. In 2012, this influenced the decision to reject a new coat of arms for the district of Mecklenburgische Seenplatte.

"Struggle is part of life" is a belief of AG GGG and written in the group's "confession of species" in which the guiding principles are laid down. The "struggle" is "naturally necessary for all becoming, being and passing away", it says. "Every single one of us and our entire species are in this struggle". Instead of the term "race" in the "species community" (Artgemeinschaft) the term "species" (Art) is used.

In September 2023, the police searched the homes of 39 members in twelve federal states. The authorities confiscated the association's assets. According to the Federal Ministry of the Interior, the right-wing extremist group is "against the idea of international understanding" and "against the constitutional order". Interior Minister Nancy Faeser (SPD) has banned the association. The association's magazine, the völkisch Nordische Zeitung ("Nordic Newspaper"), is also affected by the ban.

The Ministry of the Interior also banned the Familienwerk ("Family Association"), which is affiliated with the Artgemeinschaft. According to the statutes of the "Familienwerk", the association is intended to protect "the interests of young people and their families, with particular consideration of families with many children".

== Members ==
Membership was regulated according to racial criteria; only "northern born" people may become members. The members belong to different currents of the far-right, from militant neo-fascists to representatives of the Neue Rechte (New Right). The French theoretician of the New Right Pierre Krebs is member of Artgemeinschaft as well as the right-wing author Claus Nordbruch. Stephan Ernst, the murderer of politician Walter Lübcke was a member of Artgemeinschaft until 2011.

== Activities ==
The Office for the Protection of the Constitution of Lower Saxony named Artgemeinschaft in connection to right-wing settlement movements in Lower Saxony and Mecklenburg Vorpommern.

== See also ==
- Jürgen Rieger
- Esoteric Nazism
- Modern Paganism
- Eagle catching Fish
