= Thor Steinar =

German clothing brand

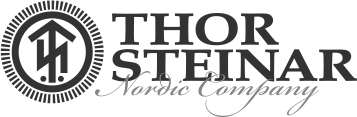
- Type: GmbH
- Industry: Fashion; Clothing
- Founded: 1999; 27 years ago
- Headquarters: Königs Wusterhausen, Brandenburg, Germany
- Brands: Tønsberg
- Number of employees: c. 160
- Parent: International Brands General Trading (since 2009)
- Website: thorsteinar.de

Thor Steinar is a German clothing brand manufactured by Thor Steinar Mediatex GmbH, a subsidiary of International Brands General Trading, a Dubai-based company.

In Germany, the brand is considered closely associated with the far right by the Verfassungschutz of the state of Brandenburg. In German media, the brand is most often discussed in the light of this association. Wearing Thor Steinar clothes is expressly forbidden in the Bundestag, the Landtage of Mecklenburg-Vorpommern and Saxony, and in several football stadiums.

== History ==
The brand was registered as a trademark by Axel Kopelke in October 2002 and was manufactured by Mediatex GmbH. In March 2009, Mediatex sold the brand to International Brands General Trading, a Dubai-based company.

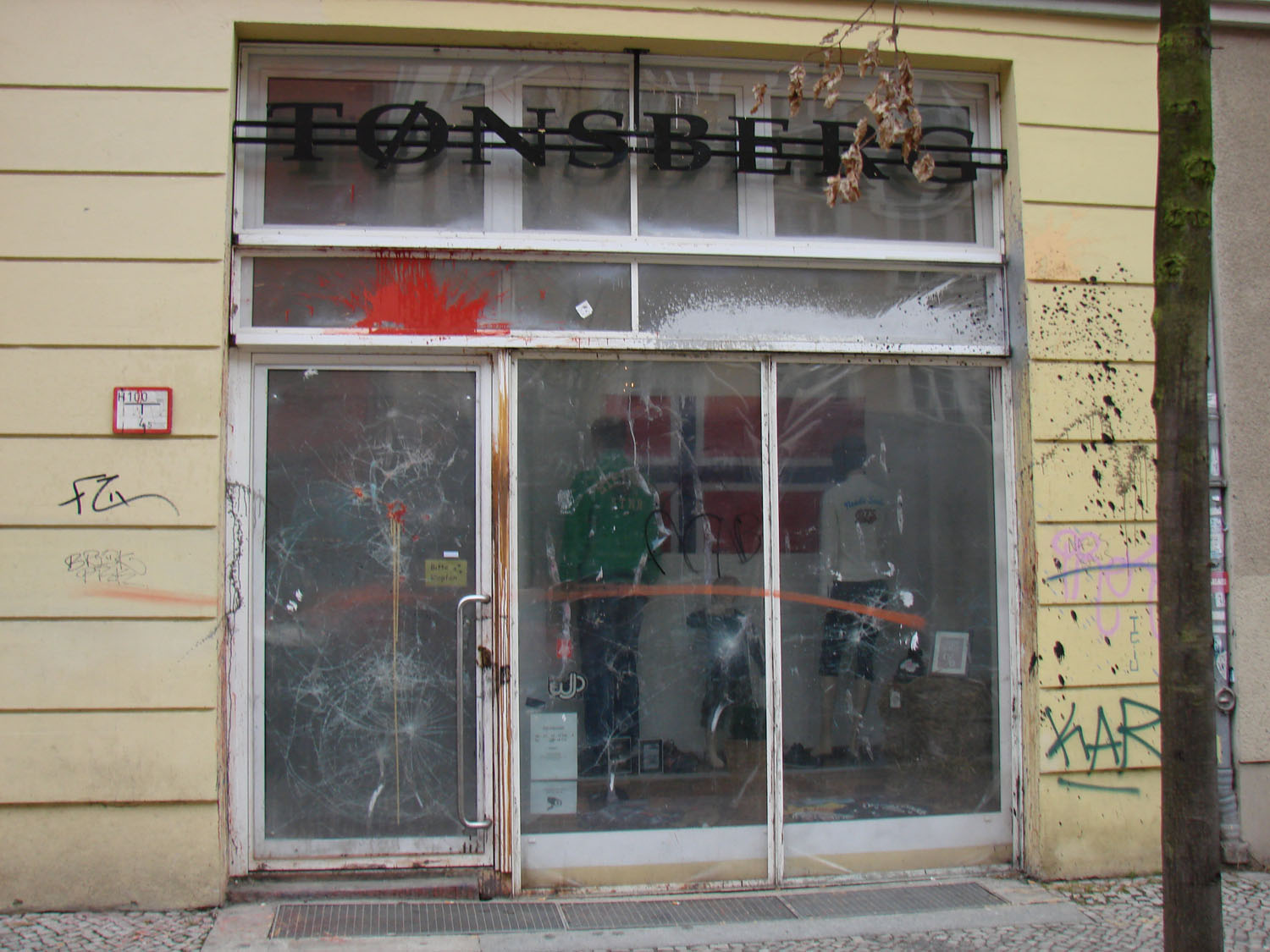
Tønsberg store in Berlin-Mitte: The façade shows marks from paint bomb attacks and is protected by acrylic glass.

Since the inception of Thor Steinar, the company has used two logos. Much of the controversy regarding the clothing label revolves around their first logo, featuring a combination of a *tiwaz rune and a *sowilo rune: the runes were combined in such a way that part of the logo became very similar to the wolfsangel used by some organisations with neo-Nazi connections. It was also used by the Nazis, as exemplified by the insignia of the 2nd SS Panzer Division Das Reich. There is also some similarity to the insignia of the Schutzstaffel. The manufacturers of the Thor Steinar brand rejected this interpretation of the original logo.

Their second logo is a gyfu rune, similar in appearance to a saltire, and has not caused controversy. This rune is known as an apolitical symbol given its historical relationship to pre-Christian mythology.

On occasions, Thor Steinar shops have been attacked with stones or paint bombs.

=== Germany ===
In Germany, public display of Nazi-associated symbols, as well as glorification of Adolf Hitler and denial of the Holocaust, are illegal (under Strafgesetzbuch section 86a and Strafgesetzbuch paragraph 130, respectively). The Federal Office for the Protection of the Constitution, which collects domestic intelligence for the government, appraises the number of active participants of the far-right movement at around 40,000.

Various authorities and organizations, including Brandenburg Verfassungsschutz, have identified the wearing of Thor Steinar clothes as one of the indications of membership in the far-right subculture.

Wearing the label is prohibited in the German Bundestag and in the Landtags of Mecklenburg-Vorpommern and Saxony. In addition, several football clubs, including Tennis Borussia Berlin, Borussia Dortmund, Werder Bremen, Hamburger SV and Hertha BSC, prohibit the label from being worn in their stadiums. Online retailer Amazon stopped selling the brand in 2009. Amazon has since been criticized for employing internal security guards with far-right connections wearing the same clothing.

=== Norway ===
Various designs by Thor Steinar have had Norwegian flags and Norwegian names, such as Trondheim, Nordfjord, Nordstrand or Bergen. The official stores selling the clothes are also named after the oldest Norwegian city, Tønsberg. The government filed a complaint against the use of the Norwegian flag in February 2008. The legal complaint however failed, and it is unlikely that a second attempt will be made. The Norwegian Embassy and the Norwegian Office for Foreign Affairs were informed by Mediatex – the company behind the Thor Steinar brand – in December 2007 that future collections starting and including the spring and summer 2008 collection will no longer use the national symbol of Norway. The company issued a statement in response to the issue.

=== Brevik store ===
Until 2008, the chain operated a store named Brevik, for the town Brevik in Telemark, Norway. In February 2012, Thor Steinar opened a new store in Chemnitz also with the name Brevik. Its similarity to the last name of Anders Behring Breivik (who committed the July 2011 Norway attacks) in conjunction with his far-right politics led to public outcry and local authorities sought to have the store closed. The store was eventually renamed to Tønsberg in March 2012.

== See also ==
- Far-right subcultures
- Nazi chic
