= Jürgen Rieger =

German lawyer and neo-Nazi (1946-2009)

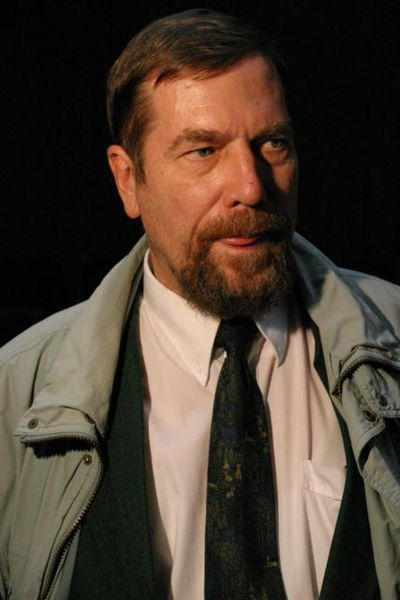
- Rieger in 2007

Deputy chairman of the NPD

Personal details
- Born: 11 May 1946 Blexen, Germany
- Died: 29 October 2009 (aged 63) Berlin, Germany
- Party: National Democratic Party of Germany (NPD)
- Children: Several
- Profession: Lawyer

Jürgen Hans Paul Rieger (11 May 1946 – 29 October 2009) was a Hamburg lawyer, avowed anti-semite, and deputy chairman of the National Democratic Party of Germany (NPD) (as of October 2009), known for his Holocaust denial. Rieger represented Arpad Wigand, former SS Police Leader of the Warsaw district in Occupied Poland, in his trial for war crimes in Hamburg District Court. Wigand was subsequently found guilty in December 1981, and sentenced to 12.5 years.

Rieger was convicted among other for battery, incitement of the people (Volksverhetzung), and the use of prohibited symbols.

Rieger joined the NPD in 2006, and became Hamburg chairman in 2007. He worked in the Heathen Artgemeinschaft Germanische Glaubens-Gemeinschaft over many years. In the 1990s, he was active in the now-suppressed far-right Wiking-Jugend and Freiheitliche Deutsche Arbeiterpartei.

He was an important figure for the NPD; because of his several party donations, the total amount was €500,000.

On 29 October 2009, Rieger died in Berlin from a stroke.

It is alleged that he used the pen name Jörg Rieck for some of his publications, including in his contribution to the "programmatic" book of the Thule Seminar, Das unvergängliche Erbe. Rieger was editor of the pseudoscientific racialist Neue Anthropologie, sister journal to Roger Pearson's Mankind Quarterly.

He was organiser of annual Rudolf Hess commemorations in Wunsiedel.

== See also ==
- The Beast Reawakens
