= Ichthys =

Christian symbol

Ichthys was adopted as a Christian symbol.

The ichthys or ichthus (from ancient Greek ΙΧΘΥΣ or ἰχθύς, "fish") is, in its modern rendition, a symbol consisting of two intersecting arcs, the right ends extending beyond the meeting point so as to resemble the profile of a fish. It has been speculated that the symbol was used by early Christians as a secret symbol: a shibboleth to determine if another was indeed Christian. It is now known colloquially as the "Jesus fish". This symbol is widely used by Christians as a sign of their faith, often being found on vehicles, necklaces and laptop stickers.

== Origin ==
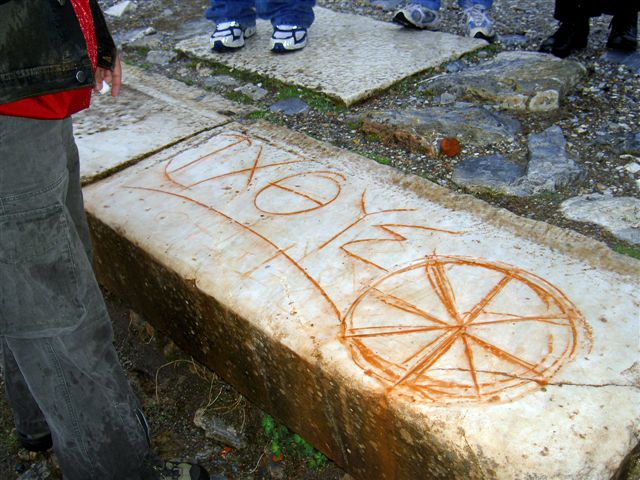
An early circular ichthys symbol, created by combining the Greek letters ΙΧΘΥΣ, carved into the marble ruins of Ephesus.

The first appearances of the ichthys in Christian art and literature dates to the 2nd century. The symbol's use among Christians had become popular by the late 2nd century, and its use spread widely in the 3rd and 4th centuries. In early Christian history, the ichthys symbol held "the most sacred significance". It has been claimed that Christians used it to recognize churches and other believers during a time when they faced persecution in the Roman Empire. Augustine, a Church Father, stated that a fish symbolized Jesus well, writing that "he was able to live [...] without sin in the abyss of this mortality as in the depth of waters". Additionally, the ichthys symbol references the sacraments of Baptism and Communion. With respect to baptism, Tertullian, an early Christian writer, "taught that just as water sustains fish, 'We, little fishes, after the image of our Ichthys, Jesus Christ, are born in the water'". For the "Holy Eucharist, with which the miracle of the multiplication of the loaves and fishes had such intimate connection both in point of time and significance".

Depicted in the Catacombs of Saint Sebastian and of the Catacomb of Priscilla, the symbol is also mentioned in the Latin text titled Oracula Sibillina, which dates back to the 1st–2nd century.

== Symbolic meaning ==
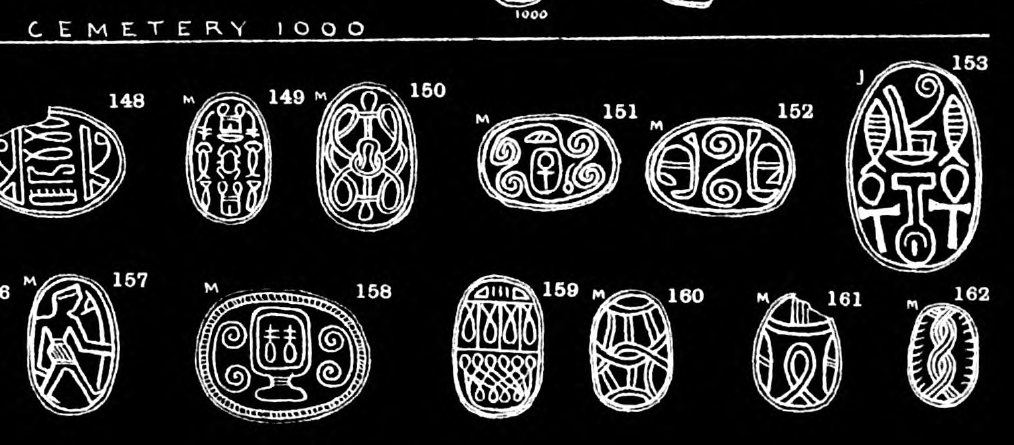
Ichthys-like fish

ἸΧΘΥΣ is an acronym or acrostic for "Ἰησοῦς Χρῑστός Θεοῦ Υἱός Σωτήρ", which translates into English as "Jesus Christ, God's Son, Savior".

A 4th-century adaptation of ichthys superimposes the Greek letters on top of each other to render a shape akin to an eight-spoked wheel. Though this shape has often been interpreted as such, it has also been proposed that the round symbol represents a loaf of bread.

== In the Gospels ==
Fish are mentioned and given symbolic meaning several times in the Gospels. Several of Jesus' 12 Apostles were fishermen. He commissions them with the words "I will make you fishers of men" (Mark 1: 16–18).

Having been resurrected, Jesus was given grilled fish in Luke 24:41–43.

At the feeding of the five thousand, a boy is brought to Jesus with "five small loaves and two fish". The question is asked, "But what are they, among so many?" Jesus multiplies the loaves and fish to feed the multitude.

In Matthew 13:47–50, the Parable of Drawing in the Net, Jesus compares the angels separating the righteous from the wicked at the end of this world to fishers sorting out their catch, keeping the good fish and throwing the bad fish away.

In John 21:11, it is related that the disciples fished all night but caught nothing. Jesus instructed them to cast the nets on the other side of the boat, and they drew in 153 fish. When they return to shore with their catch, Jesus is waiting for them and has cooked some fish for them to eat.

In Matthew 17:24–27, upon being asked if his Teacher pays the temple (or two-drachma) tax, Simon Peter answers yes. Christ tells Peter to go to the water and cast a line, saying that a coin sufficient for both of them will be found in the fish's mouth. Peter does this and finds the coin.

The fish is also used by Jesus to describe "the Sign of Jonah". (Matthew 12:38–45) This is symbolic of Jesus's resurrection, upon which the entire Christian faith is based. (1 Corinthians 15:1–58)

== Early church ==
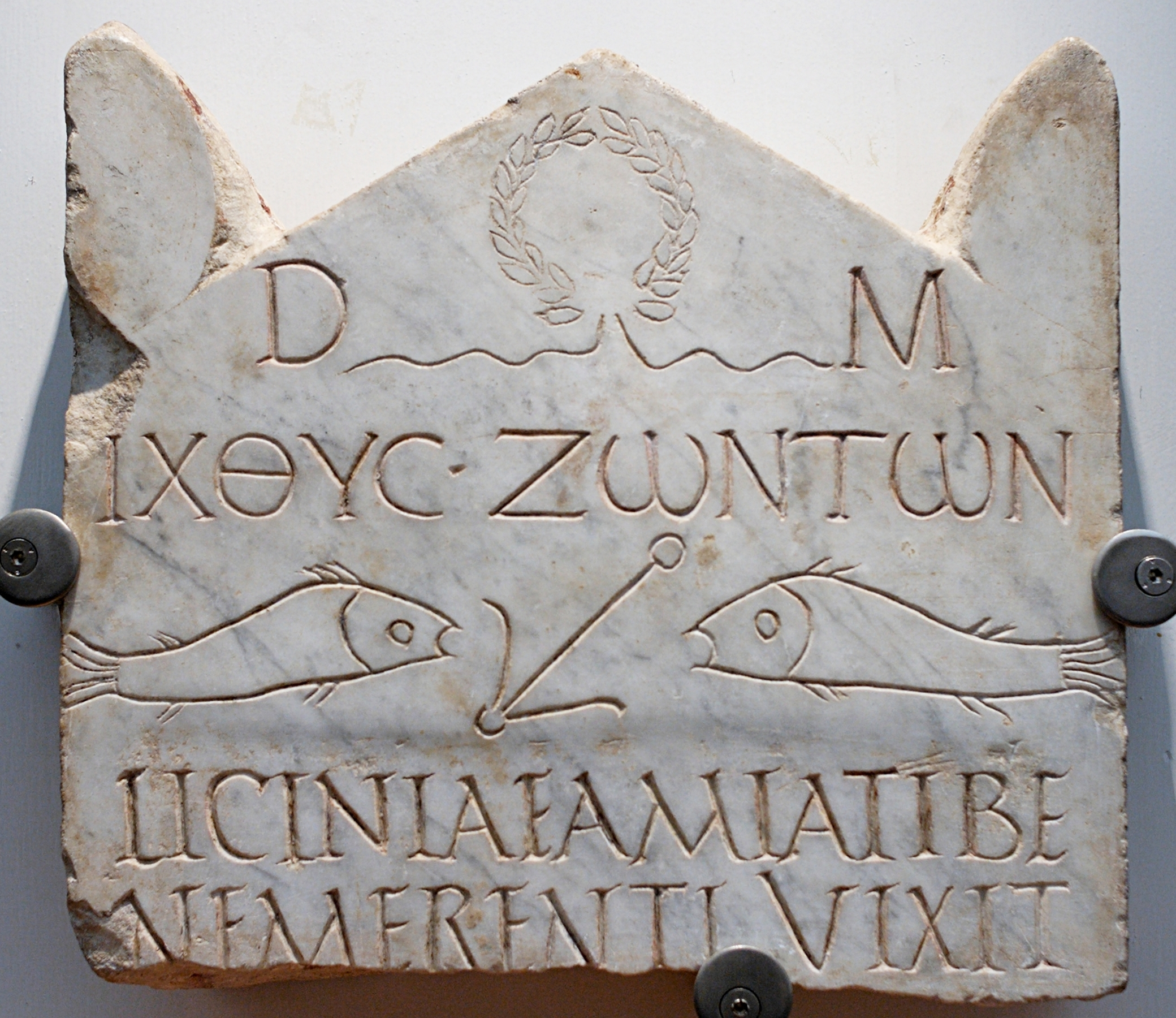
Funerary stele with the inscription ΙΧΘΥϹ ΖΩΝΤΩΝ ("fish of the living"), early 3rd century, National Roman Museum

According to tradition, ancient Christians, during their persecution by the Roman Empire in the first few centuries after Christ, used the fish symbol to mark meeting places and tombs, or to distinguish friends from foes:

According to one ancient story, when a Christian met a stranger in the road, the Christian sometimes drew one arc of the simple fish outline in the dirt. If the stranger drew the other arc, both believers knew they were in good company. Current bumper-sticker and business-card uses of the fish hearken back to this practice.

— Christianity Today, Elesha Coffman, "Ask The Expert"

There are several other hypotheses as to why the fish was chosen. Some sources indicate that the earliest literary references came from the recommendation of Clement of Alexandria to his readers (Paedagogus, III, xi) to engrave their seals with the dove or fish. However, it can be inferred from Roman monumental sources such as the Cappella Greca and the Sacrament Chapels of the catacomb of St. Callistus that the fish symbol was known to Christians much earlier.

== In popular culture ==
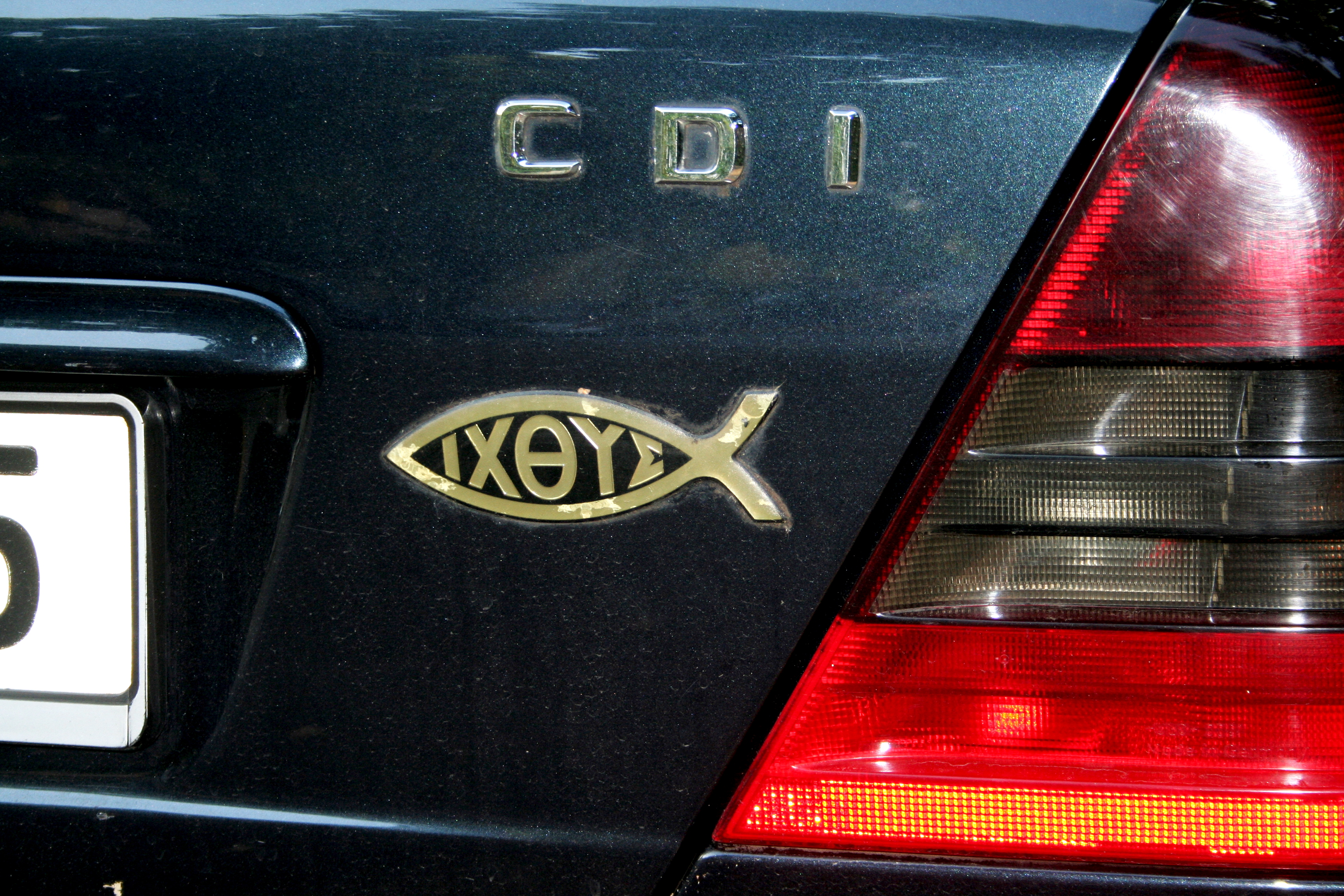
An ΙΧΘΥΣ ("ichthys") fish symbol on a car

In the 1970s the "Jesus Fish" rose in popularity as an icon of Christianity by believers. In 1973 the symbol and message was taken to the Aquarius Rock Festival in Nimbin, Australia. Today, it can be seen as a decal or emblem on the rear of automobiles or as pendants or necklaces as a sign that the owner is a Christian. These are commonly given away or sold at Christian religious goods stores. Versions of this include an Ichthys with "Jesus" or "ΙΧΘΥΣ" in the centre, or simply the Ichthys outline by itself. According to one writer, while many Christians hang a cross necklace or rosary inside their vehicles, "the fish sticker on the car is a more conscious symbol of a witnessing Christian—significantly, unlike the former, it is on the outside of the car for everyone to see."

The Ichthus Music Festival is an annual large outdoor Christian music festival held in mid-June in Wilmore, Kentucky. It is the oldest Christian music festival in the United States, starting in 1970.

== As a secret symbol ==
The idea that the ichthys was used as a secret symbol is based on an argument from silence brought forward by Robert Mowat. Both the Licinia Amia Epitaph and the Abercius inscription show the Ichthys without mention of Jesus Christ, while featuring clear attestations to Christian beliefs and themes. From this Mowat speculates, they were purposely avoiding outing themselves as Christians. As none of the early Christian sources link the Ichthys to Christian persecution, this connection has now mostly fallen out of favor (Rasimus compiles a list of early Christian references to the Ichthys, none of which point towards the persecution hypothesis and instead link it to baptism, the Eucharist, and the story of the feeding of the multitude). The idea is prominently featured and likely popularized by the 1951 movie Quo Vadis.

== See also ==
- Awareness ribbon – Symbol intended to show support or bring attention to a cause
- Chi Rho – Symbol for Jesus Christ (ΧΡΙΣΤΟΣ)
- Depictions of Jesus
- Eagle catching fish – German anti-Christian and neo-pagan symbol
- Ichthus Christian Fellowship – Fellowship of churches based in the UK
- INRI – Title of Jesus referred to in the New Testament
- Labarum – Roman military standard displaying XP for Christ
- Matsya – Fish avatar of Vishnu
- Pisces (astrology) – Twelfth astrological sign of the zodiac
- Variations of the ichthys symbol – Variation or parody of the Christian ichthys symbol
