= Che Guevara in fashion =

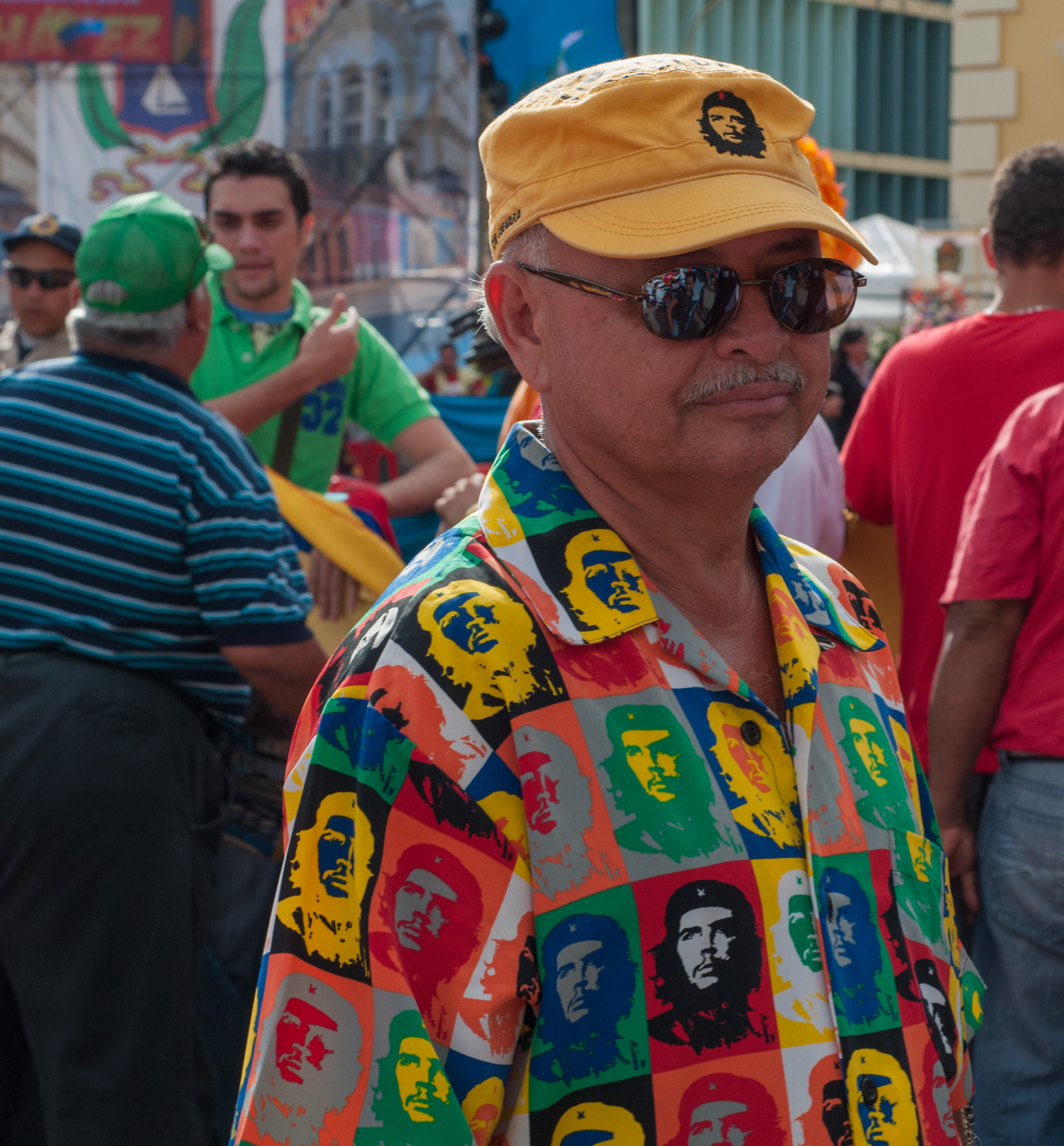
A man wearing a t-shirt and hat with multiple prints of Guevara's face, 2012

The Che Guevara trend, or "Che chic", is a fashion trend featuring the Argentine-born revolutionary Ernesto "Che" Guevara. The phenomenon has attracted attention from the media, political commentators, songwriters, and Cuban American activists due to the popularity of the T-shirt design, Che's political beliefs, and the "irony" of buying a T-shirt depicting a Marxist icon.

== Popularity ==
Che Guevara's image is a popular design for clothing, so much so that Che's likeness has been known as "the face that launched a thousand T-shirts". Commentators have noted how the T-shirt is popular among younger adults, especially university students drawn to the rebelliousness associated with the icon. Richard Castle of the Brisbane Times wryly observes that "strolling down Brunswick Street or Chapel Street, it could be easy to think Che Guevara was the only man under 40 never to have worn a Che Guevara T-shirt". The recent popularity of Che-related fashion has been attributed to economic troubles, which make Che's message more appealing.

== History ==
The image depicted on Che chic is based on the Guerrillero Heroico photograph. It is unknown when the photo was first used as a fashion design, although it was first given an artistic rework in a series of 1967 posters by the Irish artist Jim Fitzpatrick.

== Response ==
The popularity of the trend has been criticised for downplaying Che's perceived flaws and romanticising his actions. Although accounts vary, it is estimated that several hundred people were executed nationwide during his time, with Guevara's jurisdictional death total at La Cabaña ranging from 55 to 105. Critics claim that youth support the icon without being aware of the controversial figure behind it, who has been accused of using violence as a means to achieve his objectives and supposedly "driving Cuba into economic disaster" by helping to overthrow the US-backed Batista dictatorship. Critics have called the trend a "T-shirt fad".

Members of the Cuban exile community have voiced opposition to Che chic and other depictions of Che as a pop cultural icon for the same reasons.

Aleida Guevara, the eldest daughter of Che Guevara, has defended the fashion trend derived from her father's image, saying, "But look at the people who wear Che T-shirts. They tend to be those who don't conform, who want more from society, who are wondering if they can be better human beings. That, I think, he would have liked".

== See also ==
- Palestinian keffiyeh
- Communist chic
- Aestheticization of politics
