= Collapsology =

Study of the risks of collapse of industrial civilization

The term collapsology or collapse studies are neologisms used to designate the transdisciplinary study of the risks of collapse of industrial civilization. It is concerned with the general collapse of societies induced by climate change, as well as "scarcity of resources, vast extinctions, and natural disasters."

Although the concept of civilizational or societal collapse had already existed for many years, collapsology focuses its attention on contemporary, industrial, and globalized societies.

== Background ==
The word collapsology has been coined and publicized by Pablo Servigne and Raphaël Stevens in their essay: Comment tout peut s'effondrer. Petit manuel de collapsologie à l'usage des générations présentes (How everything can collapse: A manual for our times), published in 2015 in France. Collapsology as a movement goes back at least to the publication of Jared Diamond's text Collapse in 2005. Use of the term has spread, especially by journalists reporting on the deep adaptation writings by Jem Bendell.

Collapsology is based on the idea that modern human society impacts the environment in a sustained and negative way, and promotes the concept of an environmental emergency, linked in particular to global warming and biodiversity loss. Collapsologists believe, however, that the collapse of industrial civilization could be the result of a combination of different crises: environmental, but also economic, geopolitical, democratic, and others.

Recent literature reviews have shown the maturation of collapsology as an academic field. Archaeologist Guy Middleton argues that collapse studies have evolved into "a more nuanced, self-critical, and sophisticated field" that moves beyond environmental determinism and apocalyptic narratives. This evolution has led to applied collapsology, which draws from archaeology and ancient history to inform contemporary sustainability policies and climate change adaptation strategies, making collapse research increasingly relevant for resilience planning. Moreover, Brozović's comprehensive analysis of over 400 academic works identified five key scholarly conversations within collapse research: past collapses (historical and archaeological studies), general explanations of collapse (theoretical frameworks), alternatives to collapse (resilience and adaptation strategies), fictional collapses (speculative fiction and dystopian literature), and future climate change and societal collapse (predictive and scenario-based studies). Additionally, Shackelford and colleagues developed innovative methodologies for systematically reviewing the growing body of existential risk literature, including risks of human extinction and civilizational collapse, using crowdsourcing and machine learning techniques to handle the overwhelming volume of relevant research.

== Etymology ==
The word collapsology is a portmanteau derived from the Latin collapsus, 'to fall, to collapse' and from the suffix -logy, logos, 'study', which is intended to name an approach of scientific nature.

Since 2015, several words have been proposed to describe the various approaches dealing with the issue of collapse: collapsosophy to designate the philosophical approach, collapsopraxis to designate the ideology inspired by this study, and collapsonauts to designate people living with this idea in mind.

== Distinction from eschatology ==
Unlike traditional eschatological thinking, collapsology is based on data and concepts from contemporary scientific research, primarily human understanding of climate change and ecological overshoot as caused by human economic and geopolitical systems. It is not in line with the idea of a cosmic, apocalyptic "end of the world", but makes the hypothesis of the end of the human current world, the "thermo-industrial civilization".

This distinction is further stressed by historian Eric H. Cline by pointing out that while the whole world has obviously not ended, civilizations have collapsed over the course of history which makes the statement that "prophets have always predicted doom and been wrong" inapplicable to societal collapse.

== Scientific basis ==
As early as 1972, The Limits to Growth, a report produced by MIT researchers, warned of the risks of exponential demographic and economic growth on a planet with limited resources.

As a systemic approach, collapsology is based on prospective studies such as The Limits of Growth, but also on the state of global and regional trends in the environmental, social and economic fields (such as the IPCC, IPBES or Global Environment Outlook (GE) reports periodically published by the Early Warning and Assessment Division of the UNEP, etc.) and numerous scientific works as well as various studies, such as "A safe operating space for humanity"; "Approaching a state shift in Earth's biosphere", published in Nature in 2009 and 2012, "The trajectory of the Anthropocene: The Great Acceleration", published in 2015 in The Anthropocene Review, and "Trajectories of the Earth System in the Anthropocene", published in 2018 in the Proceedings of the National Academy of Sciences of the United States of America. There is evidence to support the importance of collective processing of the emotional aspects of contemplating societal collapse, and the inherent adaptiveness of these emotional experiences.

== History ==
=== Precursors ===
Although this neologism only appeared in 2015 and concerns the study of the collapse of industrial civilization, the study of the collapse of societies is much older. Among the works on this theme (in a broad sense) one can mention those of Berossus (278 B.C.), Pliny the Younger (79 AD), Ibn Khaldun (1375), Montesquieu (1734), Thomas Robert Malthus (1766–1834), Edward Gibbon (1776), Georges Cuvier, (1821), Élisée Reclus (1905), Oswald Spengler (1918), Arnold Toynbee (1939), Günther Anders (1956), Samuel Noah Kramer (1956), Leopold Kohr (1957), Rachel Carson (1962), Paul Ehrlich (1969), Nicholas Georgescu-Roegen (1971), Donella Meadows, Dennis Meadows & Jørgen Randers (1972), René Dumont (1973), Hans Jonas (1979), Joseph Tainter (1988), Al Gore (1992), Hubert Reeves (2003), Richard Posner (2004), Jared Diamond (2005), Niall Ferguson (2013).

==== Arnold J. Toynbee ====
In his monumental (initially published in twelve volumes) and highly controversial work of contemporary historiography entitled A Study of History (1972), Arnold J. Toynbee (1889–1975) deals with the genesis of civilizations (chapter 2), their growth (chapter 3), their decline (chapter 4), and their disintegration (chapter 5). According to him, the mortality of civilizations is trivial evidence for the historian, as is the fact that they follow one another over a long period of time.

==== Joseph Tainter ====
In his book The Collapse of Complex Societies, the anthropologist and historian Joseph Tainter (born 1949) studies the collapse of various civilizations, including that of the Roman Empire, in terms of network theory, energy economics and complexity theory. For Tainter, an increasingly complex society eventually collapses because of the ever-increasing difficulty in solving its problems.

==== Jared Diamond ====
The American geographer, evolutionary biologist and physiologist Jared Diamond (born 1937) already evoked the theme of civilizational collapse in his book called Collapse: How Societies Choose to Fail or Succeed, published in 2005. By relying on historical cases, notably the Rapa Nui civilization, the Vikings and the Maya civilization, Diamond argues that humanity collectively faces, on a much larger scale, many of the same issues as these civilizations did, with possibly catastrophic near-future consequences to many of the world's populations. This book has had a resonance beyond the United States, despite some criticism. Proponents of catastrophism who identify themselves as "enlightened catastrophists" draw from Diamond's work, helping build the expansion of the relational ecology network, whose members believe that man is heading toward disaster. Diamond's Collapse approached civilizational collapse from archaeological, ecological, and biogeographical perspectives on ancient civilizations.

=== Modern collapsologists in Europe ===
Since the invention of the term collapsology, many French personalities gravitate in or around the collapsologists' sphere. Not all have the same vision of civilizational collapse, some even reject the term "collapsologist", but all agree that contemporary industrial civilization, and the biosphere as a whole, are on the verge of a global crisis of unprecedented proportions. According to them, the process is already under way, and it is now only possible to try to reduce its devastating effects in the near future. The leaders of the movement are Yves Cochet and Agnès Sinaï of the Momentum Institute (a think tank exploring the causes of environmental and societal risks of collapse of the thermo-industrial civilization and possible actions to adapt to it), and Pablo Servigne and Raphaël Stevens who wrote the essay How everything can collapse: A manual for our times.

Beyond the French collapsologists mentioned above, one can mention: Aurélien Barrau (astrophysicist), Philippe Bihouix (engineer, low-tech developer), Dominique Bourg (philosopher), Valérie Cabanes (lawyer, seeking recognition of the crime of ecocide by the international criminal court), Jean-Marc Jancovici (energy-climate specialist), and Paul Jorion (anthropologist, sociologist).

In 2020 the French humanities and social science website Cairn.info published a dossier on collapsology titled The Age of Catastrophe, with contributions from historian François Hartog, economist Emmanuel Hache, philosopher Pierre Charbonnier, art historian Romain Noël, geoscientist Gabriele Salerno, and American philosopher Eugene Thacker.

The European academic who launched collapse literature into global awareness was Jem Bendell. A professor of sustainability at the University of Cumbria in the U.K., Bendell initially wrote his 2018 paper for journal publication. His advocacy for, what he called, "deep adaptation" as a response to ongoing collapse quickly propelled his writing into the English-speaking public well beyond the U.K.

=== Popularization of collapse literature in America ===
New Society Publishers in Canada published several nonfiction books on the topic of collapse by the American writer John Michael Greer: The Long Descent (2008), Decline and Fall (2014), After Progress (2015), and Dark Age America (2016).

In 2017 the American journalist David Wallace-Wells published an essay in New York Magazine titled "The Uninhabitable Earth". Two years later his book by the same title became a bestseller. Thenceforth, considerations of possible (or ongoing) collapse became widespread in English-speaking social networks and among a broad diversity of academics.

Earlier still, in a 1995 manifesto Industrial Society and Its Future, Ted Kaczynski (a.k.a. the Unabomber) warned of the threat of catastrophic societal collapse.

Popular terminology in the English language for discussing the topic of societal collapse includes the terms collapse and, more broadly, doom. Beginning in 2019, Michael Dowd proposed the term and concept of postdoom for those who understood that societal collapse was unavoidable (or already underway) yet wanted to reduce anxiety by focusing attention on outlooks and actions that could foster gratitude and meaning in daily life.

== See also ==
- Societal collapse
- Climate change and civilizational collapse
- Counter-Enlightenment
- Degeneration theory
- Dysgenics
- Historic recurrence
- Social cycle theory
