= Bendell =

Bendell is a surname. Notable people with the surname include:

- Don Bendell (born 1947), American writer
- Herman Bendell, Civil War Surgeon and Indian Agent
- Jem Bendell, professor and founder of Deep Adaptation
- Josh Bendell, rock musician
- Marilyn Bendell (1921–2003), American painter

== See also ==
- Bendel (disambiguation)
