= Michael Dowd =

American author and advocate of ecotheology and post-doom (born 1958)

The Reverend Michael Dowd
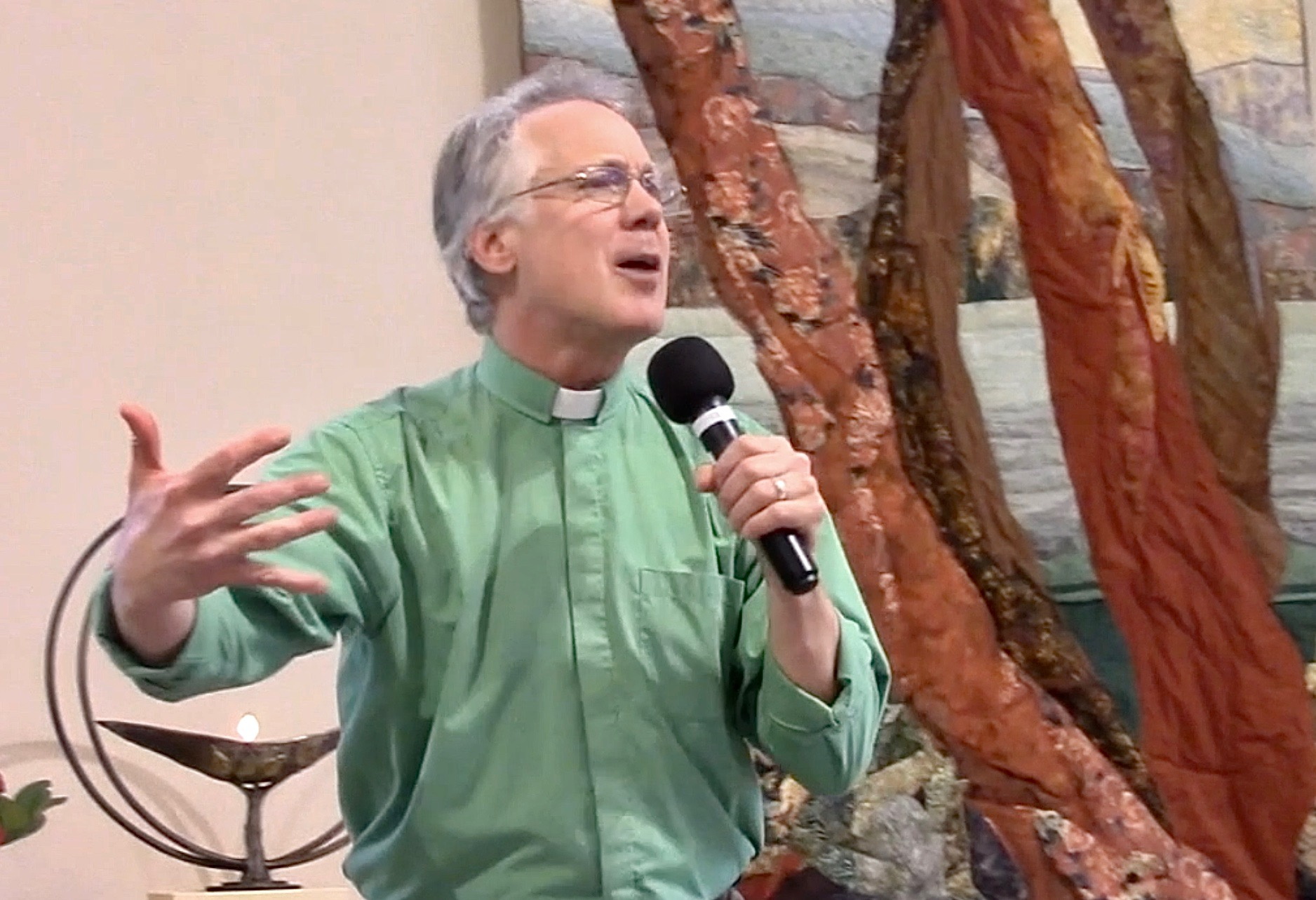
- Dowd delivering sermon, 2016
- Born: November 19, 1958
- Died: October 7, 2023 (age 64)
- Education: Evangel University (B.A.); Palmer Seminary (M.Div.)
- Known for: Epic of Evolution, evolutionary Christianity, ecotheology, post-doom

Michael Dowd (/daʊd/; November 19, 1958 – October 7, 2023) was an American author, Christian minister (United Church of Christ and Universal Life Church), lecturer, and advocate of ecotheology and post-doom.

== Evolutionary Christianity ==
Michael Dowd's 1991 book, EarthSpirit, launched his public speaking career, grounded in the epic of evolution, religious naturalism, and progressive Christianity. "Evolutionary Christianity" was his preferred topic, resulting in his sometimes being called America's "evolutionary evangelist". His 2007 book, Thank God for Evolution, brought him an invitation to contribute a chapter, "A Story Big Enough to Hold Us All", in a book published in 2009. It also extended his speaking invitations beyond religious institutions. These included the Values Caucus at the United Nations, The Skeptics Society, the Darwin Day lecture at three universities, and TEDx in Grand Rapids, Michigan, in 2012 and 2014.

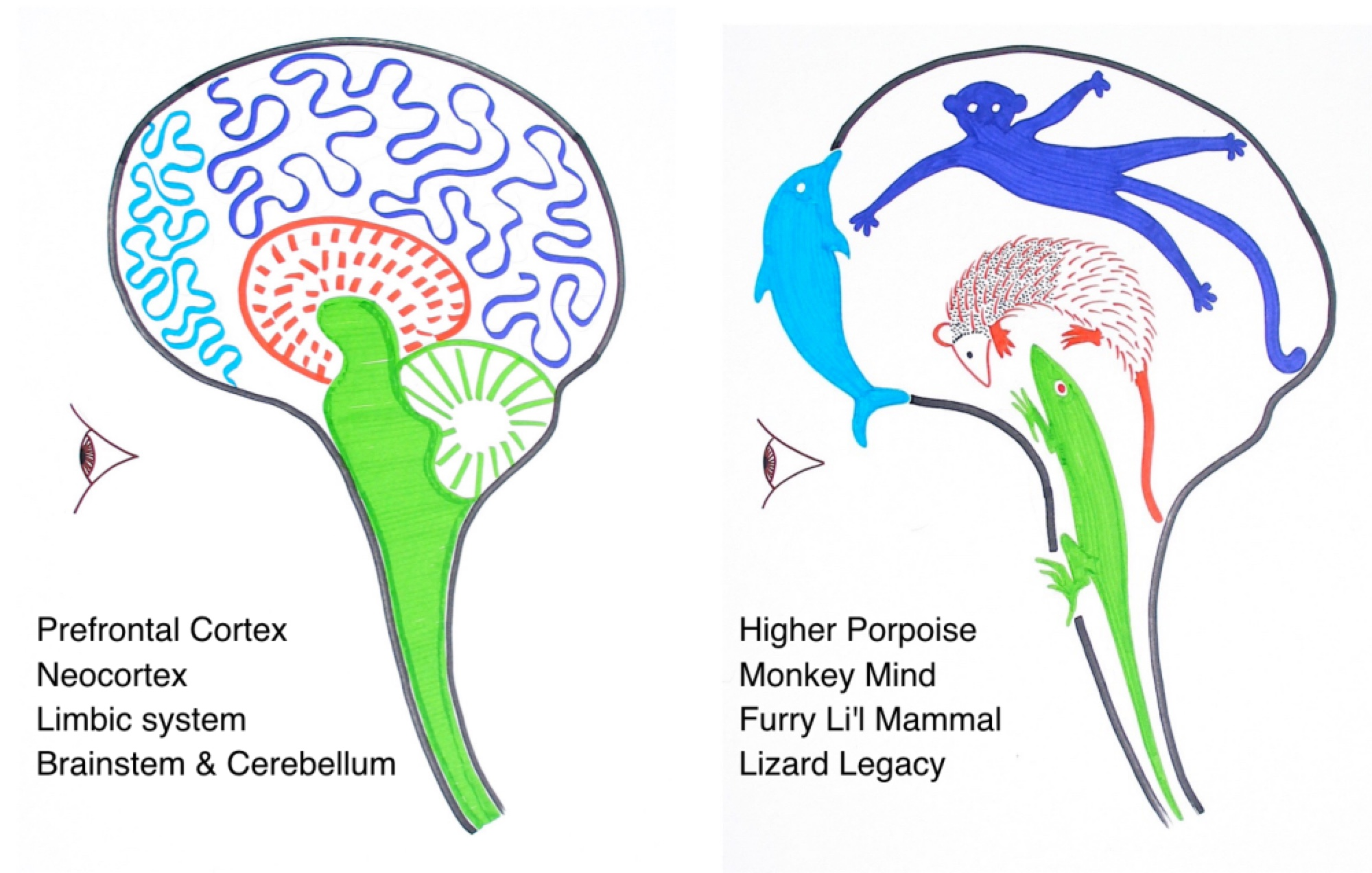
Animal metaphors charting the evolutionary history of the human brain, as presented in Thank God for Evolution

In contrast to Christian fundamentalism, Thank God for Evolution presents how an evolutionary understanding can support emotional health in practical ways. Using "the quadrune brain" distinction in medical science, Dowd presents via text and images the challenges for city-based lifestyles of our human brain anatomy that evolved during millions of years of living close to nature. In 2018 a Christian medical journal utilized Dowd's framing and animal metaphors (e.g., "lizard legacy" for the brain stem and cerebellum) to introduce how it can be used by pain management professionals.

In 2014 Dowd added climate change activism to his volunteer efforts and his public speaking in church contexts. His speaking schedule in 2014 roughly tracked the cross-US route of the Great March for Climate Action, including speaking in city parks and local churches in support of the marchers. In 2014 he adopted a stage name, "Reverend Reality", and began wearing a green clergy shirt (image at right) to exemplify his shift into foregrounding ecotheology in his presentations. He merged the science of ecology with liberal Christian theology by using the term "grace limits" when referring to ecological limits and Earth's carrying capacity.

He interpreted additional biblical metaphors for his purpose of ecological advocacy. Primary among them was the need for humanity to break away from ecological destruction and to seek redemption as the "prodigal species" who was finally "coming home to Reality". For guidance in how to do this, Dowd offered a set of "Reality's Rules: Ten Commandments to Avoid Extinction and Redeem Humanity". He wrote and spoke of the ten in the form of "Thus sayeth the Lord":

1. Stop thinking of me as anything less than the voice of undeniable and inescapable reality.
2. Stop thinking of ‘revelation’ or ‘divine instruction’ without including evidence.
3. Stop thinking of Genesis, or your creation story, apart from the history of the universe.
4. Stop thinking of theology apart from ecology: the interdisciplinary study of my nature.
5. Stop defining and measuring ‘progress’ in short-term, human-centered ways.
6. Stop allowing the free or subsidized polluting of the commons.
7. Stop using renewable resources faster than they can be replenished.
8. Stop using non-renewable resources in ways that harm or rob future generations.
9. Stop exploring for coal, oil, and natural gas—keep most of it in the ground.
10. Stop prioritizing the wants of the wealthy over the needs of the poor.

== Postdoom ==
In 2015 Dowd read the 1980 book by William R. Catton Jr.: Overshoot: The Ecological Basis of Revolutionary Change. That reading "changed everything" for Dowd and launched him on the path he would later call postdoom. John Halstead described Catton's influence in a memorium for Dowd that he wrote in 2023: "Post-doom teaches that, ironically, it is the very urge to cling to hope and the faith in progress and technology that is driving us faster and faster toward our own annihilation. When we refuse to acknowledge natural limits, then we end up hastening the very outcome that we want to avoid."

By 2019 Dowd had pivoted his message to a pastoral form of support for those who, like himself, had lost hope that climate change, ecological overshoot, biodiversity loss and other causes of civilizational collapse already underway could be halted. Post-doom was the word he coined for the process of moving through the stages of grief, then beyond mere acceptance and more fully into "calm, clarity, and courageous love-in-action". Increasingly, he became known as the "postdoom pastor".

In her 2021 book, Victoria Loorz writes of "Michael Dowd's post-doom spirituality" and describes it as "a spirituality that accepts the fullness of our reality: the tragedy as well as the beauty. This spirituality moves into—and then eventually beyond—grief and repentance toward a deeper, more courageous, compassionate, and spiritual aliveness. Post-doom spirituality is, as Dowd says, 'what opens up when we remember who we are, accept the inevitable, honor our grief, and prioritize what is pro-future and soul-nourishing'."

As Dowd reflects in a 2022 essay, "Denial, anger, bargaining, depression, acceptance: where are you in the vaunted stages of grief? And is doom automatically the end point?" He continues, "I began to explore (with others) the possibility of compassionate 'post-doom' forms of awareness." His 2023 essay in Progressing Spirit is titled, "The Real End Times: From Doom to Faith". He writes,

A post-doom perspective is practical without promoting nihilism or lethargy. Trust, a secular name for faith, is its foundation. From there, generous and compassionate actions can continue, but they tend to be smaller in scope. They are here and now. They are free of frantic imperatives to engage in protests with the aim of transforming "the system." Post-doom overall is hope-free. Dipping even one toe into this cool pool of acceptance can begin to yield benefits—emotional, spiritual, and relational benefits.

An opinion piece published in the UK-based Church Times in 2022 was titled, "What we can learn from the 'post-doomers'". The author writes that "spirituality features quite prominently" among those who identify or ally with the post-doom perspective: "Christians such as Michael Dowd and Fr Richard Rohr are making their contributions."

In a 2023 essay, Dowd includes a list of 15 "Postdoom Benefits" developed by Karen Perry. Jem Bendell, the originator of the Deep Adaptation concept, also wrote about Perry's benefits list in 2023. Dowd features other perspectives on the topic of postdoom in both video and audio formats by conducting conversations with more than 50 people from 2019 through 2023. These and other resources can be accessed on the website Dowd originated in 2019: Postdoom.com website.

He delivered his final sermon, titled Being the Calm in the Storm, at the Unitarian Universalist Congregation of Flint, Michigan on August 13, 2023.

Dowd was on the Board of Advisors of the Religious Naturalist Association. Its June 2025 newsletter reported that Dowd's ashes were spread along the grave of Thomas Berry marking the 1-year anniversary of his death, along with two links. The first goes to a posted video of the ceremony: "Michael Dowd and Thomas Berry: Together Again". The second goes to a chronological list and photo-rich essay, "Dowd's Worldview Shifts: Epic of Evolution to Ecological Overshoot to Postdoom".

== Personal life and death ==
In 2020, after living on the road for 18 years with his wife, the science writer Connie Barlow, teaching and preaching on "The Great Story" (Epic of Evolution), the COVID-19 lockdowns forced the couple to settle. They chose Ypsilanti, Michigan. There, his youngest daughter had recently given birth to Dowd's second grandchild (by his first wife, Alison Rene).

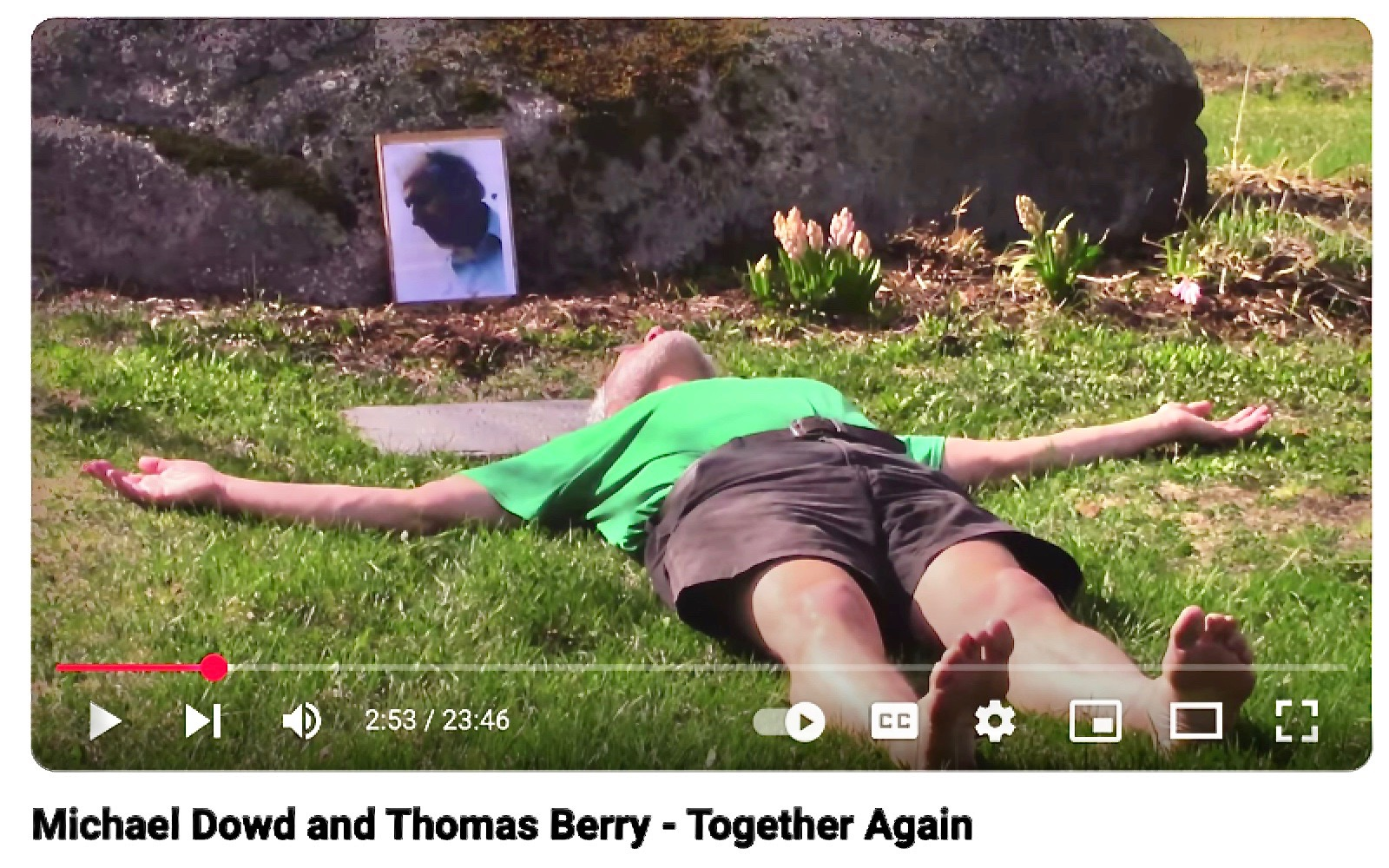
Michael Dowd at the grave of his mentor, Thomas Berry, in 2019

In October 2023 he drove to Poughkeepsie, New York, just in time to attend his father's death while in hospice. Two days later, Dowd experienced a massive heart attack at a friend's home and died that night. He was cremated the day after his father's funeral and burial.

Commemorating the first anniversary of Dowd's death, Sister Gail Worcelo and Gerry Russell led a ceremony at Green Mountain Monastery in Greensboro, Vermont. There, they and others spread a large portion of his ashes at the boulder marking the grave of Thomas Berry. This was at the request of Michael's widow, who had taken the photo at right in May 2019, their last visit to the monastery and Thomas's grave. A video of the ceremony was posted by Gerry Russell, with music and photos added.
