= Extinct cultures =

Related articles include:

- Societal collapse
- Cultural assimilation
