= Post-doom =

Concept articulated by Michael Dowd in 2019

Postdoom, also post-doom, is a concept articulated by Michael Dowd in 2019 in his quest to "find the gift" beyond mere acceptance that ongoing climate change would inevitably lead to civilizational collapse. As Dowd reflected in a 2022 essay, "Denial, anger, bargaining, depression, acceptance: where are you in the vaunted stages of grief? And is doom automatically the end point?" He continued, "I began to explore (with others) the possibility of compassionate 'post-doom' forms of awareness." By the time of his death, Dowd had conducted more than fifty conversations with colleagues exploring the topic of post-doom, which are documented online in both video and audio formats.

Others who subsequently have used the term 'postdoom' as a descriptor of their own trajectory in moving through climate anxiety and a sense that societal collapse is inevitable include Shaun Chamberlin, Paul Ehrlich, and Meg Wheatley. Jem Bendell, who named and established the concept of Deep Adaptation in 2018, has also accepted post-doom as a relevant descriptor. Rupert Read, a leader of the climate activist group Extinction Rebellion, contrasted post-doom with the doom perspective in his 2022 book. He wrote, "They are rather post-doom. They contain a willingness to undertake a full-spectrum active response to what leads 'doomers' by contrast to give up and to resort to desperate rants and survivalist 'prepping' only."

== Definitions ==
In her 2023 book, Terry LePage posted three definitions of post-doom. These she derived from the postdoom website, created and managed until his death in October 2023 by Michael Dowd:

1. What opens up when we remember who we are and how we got here, accept the inevitable, honor our grief, and prioritize what is pro-future and soul-nourishing.

2. A fierce and fearless reverence for life and expansive gratitude—even in the midst of abrupt climate mayhem and the runaway collapse of societal harmony, the health of the biosphere, and business as usual.

3. Living meaningfully, compassionately, and courageously, no matter what.

The post-doom approach has been described as entailing "a positive disintegration of self and values, to refocus one’s mind, and entire existence, on things that really matter."

In her 2021 book, Victoria Loorz writes of "Michael Dowd's post-doom spirituality" and describes it as "a spirituality that accepts the fullness of our reality: the tragedy as well as the beauty. This spirituality moves into—and then eventually beyond—grief and repentance toward a deeper, more courageous, compassionate, and spiritual aliveness. Post-doom spirituality is, as Dowd says, 'what opens up when we remember who we are, accept the inevitable, honor our grief, and prioritize what is pro-future and soul-nourishing'."

== Benefits ==
Gratitude is a benefit Dowd highlighted in a 2021 interview. He spoke of his own journey through and beyond collapse acceptance that culminated in "deep and profound gratitude for the gift of being alive and conscious and in love with life."

In his 2023 book, Jem Bendell posts a list of "psychological benefits" articulated by "collapse-acceptance advocate Karen Perry", who is known for her "post-doom outlook". Stressing three of the action-inducing benefits, Bendell describes their manifestation from "community involvement and defense, solidarity with those less privileged or suffering the worst effects, and making amends by doing what one can to lessen suffering and create potential for future life."

Distinguishing "collapse acceptance" as a stage "beyond awareness and grief", Karen Perry posted 15 benefits of collapse acceptance in March 2023. She advised readers that "these benefit examples are seeds, not a recipe. How they manifest is unique to everyone." The titles and taglines of the benefits are:

1. Freedom – the move away from shoulds to the open doors of coulds
2. Urgency – "no time like the present" has never meant more
3. Parameters – playing the game with a different framework and lens
4. Presence – focus on today with heightened awareness of being here now
5. Gratitude – impossible to ignore all we’ve been given (and taken)
6. Calm Grounding – not disrupted by catastrophic information
7. Community Localism – ability to affect those in close proximity
8. Super Hero Release – good riddance to pressure and guilt
9. Universalism – heightened connection to the Oneness of everything
10. Empathy – towards self and all others
11. Privilege Perspective – ability to view it and use it in a radical way
12. Amends – finding forgiveness and completeness in all relationships, including with self
13. Death Comfort – forces the conversation and preparation
14. Letting Go – of control, worry, fear, blame, shame, legacy, dreams, expectations
15. Enjoyment – global hospice time to have fun with the bucket list

== Spiritual and religious responses ==
"Post-doomers" is in the title of a 2022 opinion piece published in the UK-based Church Times. The author writes that "spirituality features quite prominently" among those who identify or ally with the post-doom perspective: "Christians such as Michael Dowd and Fr Richard Rohr are making their contributions." He also points to the writings of author and blogger John Halstead, whose video conversation with Dowd is one of those featured on the postdoom website:

John Halstead has commented that "what these 'post-doomers' have in common is that they have passed through a kind of 'dark night of the soul' with regard to climate change and environmental devastation generally, and they are now exploring the terrain on the other side of despair. It isn't so much about recovering a lost hope, as it is figuring out how to live joyful and socially responsible lives in light of impending collapse."
