= Subnature =

Subnature is the undesirable by-products of urbanization, industrialization, war, abandonment, and societal collapse. The concept was coined by historian David Gissen. Subnature includes things such as smog, dust, exhaust gas, industrial smoke, sewage, debris, rubble, vermin, and weeds.

The concept has been used in historical and theoretical writing on architecture, literature, music, and food studies.
