= Thank God for Evolution =

2007 book by Michael Dowd

- Author: Michael Dowd
- Publisher: Council Oak Books
- Publication date: 2007
- Pages: 432
- ISBN: 9781571782106

Thank God for Evolution is a book by Michael Dowd that argues for a marriage of science and religion within an evolutionary paradigm.

It was published by Council Oak Books in November 2006 and acquired in spring 2007 by Viking Penguin. In the book and in his sermons, Dowd presents evolution as a sacred epic of emerging complexity that can be seen as "14 billion years of grace."
