= Jem Bendell =

British professor of sustainability leadership

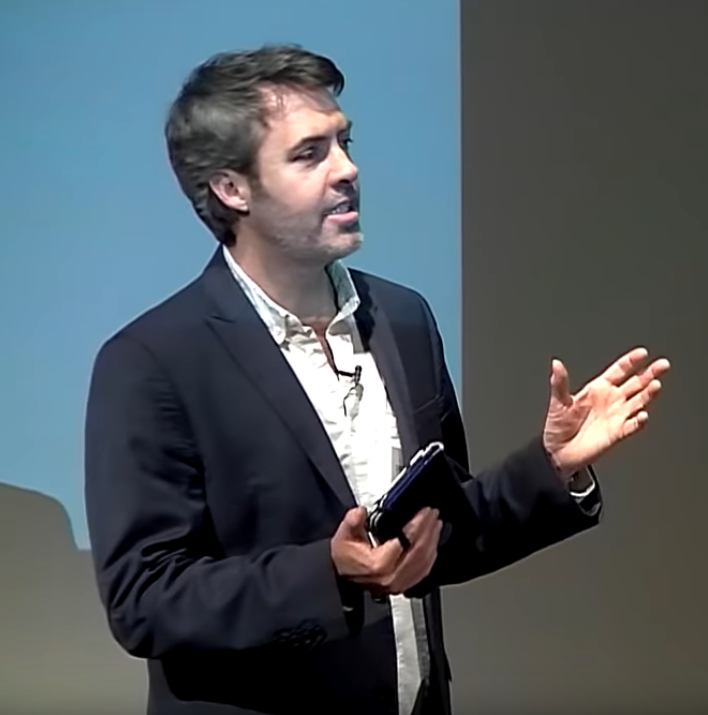
- Bendell presenting a keynote address on climate anxiety to the UK Council for Psychotherapy
- Born: London, England
- Education: University of Cambridge; University of Bristol
- Website: jembendell.com

Jem Bendell is an emeritus professor of sustainability leadership with the University of Cumbria in the UK. He is best known for originating in 2018 the concept of "deep adaptation" for individuals and communities anticipating (or already coping with) the consequences of ongoing climate change. In 2019 he founded the Deep Adaptation Forum to support peer-to-peer communications in developing positive responses at the individual and community levels to societal disruptions induced by climate change.

== Career ==
Bendell graduated from the University of Cambridge in 1995 with a degree in Geography, beginning his career at the World Wide Fund for Nature UK. There, he helped to develop the Forest Stewardship Council and the Marine Stewardship Council. He specialised on relationships between NGOs and business, pointing out their potential, despite warning about the power inequities and the way in which business agendas tend to prevail over those of the non-profit sector.

He earned a PhD from the University of Bristol.

In 2006, Bendell worked with the World Wide Fund for Nature UK, analysing and ranking the social and environmental performance of luxury brands. His resulting report, Deeper Luxury: Quality and Style When the World Matters, was discussed internationally in over 50 newspapers as of late 2007. The report argued that luxury brands were not meeting the expectations of customers for high performance on social and environmental issues.

He also became involved in the anti-globalisation movement, later writing a United Nations report on the conflict between business and civil society. He founded Lifeworth, a progressive professional services company mostly working with UN agencies and worked part time as an associate professor of management at Griffith Business School. As of 2008, he had published over fifty publications, two books, and four United Nations reports.

After his time consulting for the United Nations, in 2012 Bendell joined Cumbria University and founded the Institute for Leadership and Sustainability (IFLAS). On account of this work, the World Economic Forum named him a Young Global Leader, a network he has subsequently criticized as elitist and neoliberal. In a 2011 TEDx talk he expanded his focus to monetary reform and complementary currencies, mentioning Bitcoin, and predicting that Facebook would launch their own currency.

In his 2014 book Healing Capitalism, Bendell proposes a new way of respecting private property whereby ownership rights would place a duty on owners (and their fiduciaries) to maintain demonstrable accountability to anyone directly affected by their property. This need for "capital accountability" would compel shareholders to be as interested in how corporations are accountable to stakeholders as they would be in either share price or dividends.

In 2017 he took a year out from university to independently study the research publications on climate change. He also provided strategic communication advice to the Leader of the Labour Party regarding the 2017 United Kingdom general election.

In 2022, Bendell attended the climate conference COP27 in Egypt, giving two speeches with warnings for the delegates. First, that there will be a spike in global temperatures due to the reductions in aerosols. Second, that there will be a rise in a new kind of climate skepticism that regards any action as motivated by authoritarianism. Bendell offers both deep adaptation and ecolibertarianism as a response to both of these trends, amongst others.

In 2023 Bendell relocated to Bali, Indonesia, where he is developing a school for regenerative farming.

== Deep Adaptation ==
=== The initial controversy ===
Jem Bendell's career took a turn in 2018, following his publication of an essay in July 2018 titled, "Deep Adaptation: A Map for Navigating Climate Tragedy." The essay was published on the website of his university because, as he explained in its first paragraph, "This paper was rejected for publication by reviewers of Sustainability Accounting, Management and Policy Journal (SAMPJ), as reviewers made requests for major changes which were considered by the author as either impossible or inappropriate to undertake."

A controversy developed. In February 2019, a senior researcher at the Tyndall Centre for Climate Change Research told a reporter that he agreed with Bendell's overall assessment: "I think societal collapse is indeed inevitable," Erik Buitenhuis said, "though the process is likely to take decades to centuries." Later that year, a news story reported another senior climate scientist saying the opposite. Michael E. Mann asserted that Bendell's essay is "wrong on the science and impacts: There is no credible evidence that we face 'inevitable near-term collapse.'”

Controversy diminished somewhat when Bendell published a revised version of the paper in 2020 in which the first sentence of his abstract clarified that the inevitability of societal collapse was his personal conclusion, not an established scientific fact: "The purpose of this conceptual paper is to provide readers with an opportunity to reassess their work and life in the face of what I believe to be an inevitable near-term societal collapse due to climate change." Elsewhere in the paper he explains,

With each of these framings — collapse, catastrophe, extinction – people describe different degrees of certainty. Different people speak of a scenario being possible, probable or inevitable. In my conversations with both professionals in sustainability or climate, and others not directly involved, I have found that people choose a scenario and a probability depending not on what the data and its analysis might suggest, but what they are choosing to live with as a story about this topic. That parallels findings in psychology that none of us are purely logic machines but relate information into stories about how things relate and why (Marshall, 2014). None of us are immune to that process. Currently, I have chosen to interpret the information as indicating inevitable collapse, probable catastrophe and possible extinction.

In a 2020 interview reported in The New York Times, Bendell clarified that his sense of societal collapse as an inevitability came not only from his sabbatical study of academic papers published on the science of climate change. He said,

My own conclusion that it is too late to prevent a breakdown in modern civilization in most countries within our lifetimes is not purely based on an assessment of climate science. It's based on my view of society, politics, economics from having worked on probably 25 countries across five continents, worked in the intergovernmental sector of the U.N., been part of the World Economic Forum, working in senior management in environmental groups, being on boards of investment funds.

=== Societal impacts ===
Overall, responses to the paper were split among academics as well as popular audiences. Some reviewers dismissed deep adaptation as a poorly substantiated, doomist framing that could reduce activism and efforts to implement systemic changes to thwart climate change. Others contended that Bendell's advocacy for actions favoring "resilience, relinquishment, restoration, and reconciliation" (the "4 Rs") provides a useful framework for individual and community approaches aimed at adapting to the impacts of climate change already underway and likely to continue.

In 2022 a favorable opinion piece was published in the UK-based Church Times. The author focused on the "Deep Adaptation" paper and its growing influence in ways that he considers favorable. Pointing to the "4 Rs" that Bendell advocates, he concludes that these "resonate strongly for Christians." Well-known Christian proponents are pointed to: Michael Dowd and the Franciscan priest Richard Rohr. Quoting directly from Bendell's paper,

In the light of the seriousness of the situation, Professor Bendell calls for "a commitment to working together to do what's helpful during the disruption and collapse of societies," and to adopt "an ethos of being engaged, open-hearted, and open-minded about how to be and how to respond."

The paper thus achieved popularity. By 2023 it had been downloaded more than a million times. It influenced the founding members of Extinction Rebellion, and it provided the nucleus for online communities with thousands of members. The Deep Adaptation Forum was launched in 2019, "to connect and support people who, in the face of 'inevitable' societal collapse, want to explore how they can 'reduce suffering, while saving more of society and the natural world'."

=== Breaking together ===
A 526-page book by Bendell was published in 2023 by the Schumacher Institute. It carries forward and elaborates his personal vision of deep adaptation, utilizing new and traditional scholarship in the field of collapsology, as distinguished from the prevailing worldview of progressivism. Titled Breaking Together: A Freedom-Loving Response to Collapse, he clarifies that he now sees societal collapse not only as "inevitable" but as a process "already underway," especially in less privileged parts of the world. "Doomster" is the label he accepts for himself, while also pointing favorably to colleagues who call their perspective "post-doom." By 2025, the book had been translated into French, Spanish, and Portuguese editions.

An April 2026 article published in the magazine Grist explores the ongoing impact of Bendell's 2018 Deep Adaptation paper and his 2023 book. There, Maya Frost (founder of "Collapse Forward") portrays him as "the modern-day forefather of collapse understanding and awareness." Reflecting on the changes since both his viral paper and book, the Grist journalist wrote, "It's no longer taboo to talk about the breakdown of society. But most people resist truly letting the idea in, and letting it change them the way it changed Bendell."

== Selected bibliography ==
- McIntosh, Malcolm; Bendell, Jem (2013). "Chapter 14: Currencies of transition". The Necessary Transition: The Journey Towards the Sustainable Enterprise Economy. Greenleaf. ISBN 978-1-906093-89-1.
- Bendell, Jem; Doyle, Ian (31 March 2014). Healing Capitalism: Five Years in the Life of Business, Finance and Corporate Responsibility. Greenleaf Publishing. ISBN 9781906093914.
- Bendell, Jem (2018-07-27). "Deep adaptation: a map for navigating climate tragedy".
- Bendell, Jem (2019). "Chapter 11: Doom and bloom: adapting to collapse". In Extinction Rebellion (ed.). This Is Not a Drill: An Extinction Rebellion Handbook. Penguin. pp. 73–80. ISBN 9780141991443.
- Bendell, Jem (2023). Breaking Together: A Freedom-Loving Response to Collapse. Bristol: Good Works - Schumacher Institute.
- Bendell, Jem (2025). S'effondrer Ensemble : Vers l'écoliberté. Dandelion (ed.).
