= Deep Adaptation =

Concept of coping with climate collapse

Deep Adaptation is a concept, agenda, and international social movement. It is premised on the argument that extreme weather events and other effects of climate change will increasingly disrupt food, water, shelter, power, and social and governmental systems. These disruptions would likely or inevitably cause uneven societal collapse in the next few decades. The word “deep” indicates that strong measures are required to adapt to an unraveling of industrial lifestyles, following prior usages such as deep ecology. The agenda includes values of nonviolence, compassion, curiosity and respect, with a framework for constructive action.

== Origin ==
The concept of Deep Adaptation was introduced in the 2018 paper "Deep Adaptation: A Map for Navigating Climate Tragedy" by University of Cumbria sustainability leadership professor Jem Bendell. The paper was submitted to the Sustainability Accounting, Management and Policy Journal, but reviewers requested major revisions. Bendell then chose to self-publish through the Institute for Leadership and Sustainability at the University of Cumbria. In the paper, Bendell stated that near term social collapse due to climate disruption was inevitable. He has since offered that as opinion, rather than fact, in a second version of the paper in 2020. The original paper was addressed to the corporate and academic sustainability community but found a large general readership, being downloaded more than 600,000 times as of November 2019. The paper has been translated into a number of languages.

=== Content of original paper ===
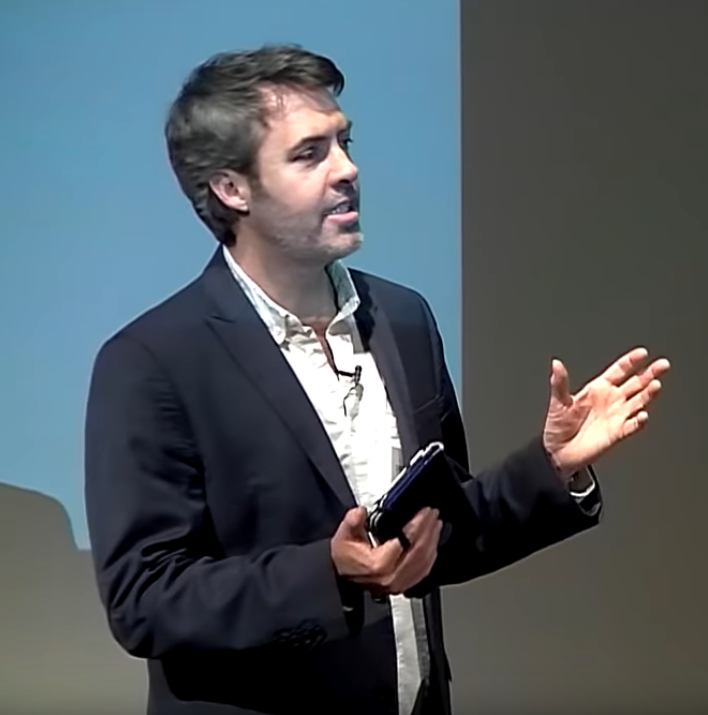
Jem Bendell, 2019

In the 2018 paper, Bendell asserted that “near term social collapse” (which he later called societal collapse) due to climate change is inevitable. He challenged the practice of business as usual in government, industry, and academia, announcing “the end of the idea that we can either solve or cope with climate change.” He reviewed scientific research on climate change, stating that he emphasized recent unpublished results and factors such as tipping points. In his view, these rendered published predictions of climate damage overly conservative.

Bendell then proposed the types of denial that prevent people from facing the likelihood of collapse. He shared his experience of coming to terms emotionally and existentially with the idea of collapse in his lifetime. The tone of the paper was personal, and has been described as autoethnographic. With dark humor, he noted that his conclusions make his academic field of specialization, sustainability, unviable. Finally, he challenged academics and policymakers to shift to a 'Deep Adaptation Agenda' of responses to climate change. He offered a framework for that agenda, characterized by three approaches: resilience, “what are the valued norms and behaviours that human societies will wish to maintain as they seek to survive?”; relinquishment, “letting go of certain assets, behaviors and beliefs, where retaining them could make matters worse”; and restoration, “rediscovering attitudes and approaches to life and organization that our hydrocarbon-fuelled civilization eroded.”

=== Reception and responses ===
Several scientists noted that Bendell’s conclusion of the inevitability of near term social collapse due to climate disruption was neither proven nor widely accepted. Climatologist Michael Mann was scathing in his assessments of Bendell’s scientific conclusions, and Gavin Schmidt, head of NASA's Goddard Institute for Space Studies, asserted that previous climate trends of gradual change would continue. Scientists and environmental writers differed on their assessments of the likelihood of collapse. For instance, lead author of the 2019 UN global disaster risk assessment, Scott Williams, said that Bendell was closer to the mark than his detractors, as the UN report was "close to stating that ‘collapse is inevitable." Responding to Nicholas, Hall and Schmidt, biologist Pablo Servigne and colleagues found the Deep Adaptation work to be credible, and the criticisms often misleading. They noted that those criticisms do not invalidate the main message that collapse is a probability high enough to demand rapid and deep adaptation.

Bendell published a response to critics of his 2018 paper in mid-2020. Bendell also issued a revised version of the original paper in 2020. The original paper stated that “social collapse is inevitable.” The revision is “premised on the view that societal collapse is likely, inevitable, or already unfolding.” Since the paper’s publication, numerous scientific measures of the pace of climate change have exceeded predictions.

The paper also faced ethical criticisms. These criticisms start from the assumption that stating a dark view of climate change leads to despair and inaction. Researchers Nicholas, Hall and Schmidt asserted that Bendell's claim of inevitable societal collapse due to runaway climate change was not only wrong, but that it would undermine the cause of the climate movement. Michael Mann, and science journalist Ronald Bailey in Reason have voiced similar concerns.

Environmental activist and professor Rupert Read welcomed Bendell's analysis, suggesting that although the inevitability of societal collapse can be debated, its likelihood means that we must engage with the concept of Deep Adaptation because of the precautionary principle. Naresh Giangrande, a founder of the first Transition Town, called the paper an important part of a growing field of credible scholarship on the real risks of societal collapse from impacts of climate disruption. Social justice trainer Brooke Lavelle and sustainability researcher Zach Walsh asked, "What if our efforts to create a more just and caring world weren't separated from our efforts to adapt to near-term social collapse?"

Logo from the Deep Adaptation Forum in 2020

=== Emergence of a broader movement ===
Bendell's paper popularized the term "Deep Adaptation" and catalysed the emergence of associated online communities. The BBC says that the paper "sparked a global movement with thousands of followers" who wish to "adapt their lifestyles to cope with the harsh conditions" through the principles of Deep Adaptation. BBC presenter John Humphrys notes that the paper influenced the founders of Extinction Rebellion.

In March 2019, Bendell and associates launched the Deep Adaptation Forum "for people who are seeking and building supportive communities to face the reality of the climate crisis." The group's website lists guiding principles including compassion, curiosity, and respect, and a stance of non-violence. Its stated purpose is “to embody and enable loving responses to our predicament, so that we reduce suffering while saving more of society and the natural world.”

The New York Times reported that a Facebook group titled "Positive Deep Adaptation" (since renamed "Deep Adaptation") had nearly 10,000 members as of March 2020 and was the most active site for the Deep Adaptation community, while 3,000 individuals participated in the official Deep Adaptation Forum. A LinkedIn group titled 'Deep Adaptation' includes professors, government scientists, and investors.

== Development of the Deep Adaptation Concept and Agenda ==
Bendell added a fourth “R”, reconciliation, to the Deep Adaptation framework in 2019:

- Resilience: what do we most value that we want to keep, and how?
- Relinquishment: what do we need to let go of so as not to make matters worse?
- Restoration: what could we bring back to help us with these difficult times?
- Reconciliation: with what and whom shall we make peace as we awaken to our mutual mortality?

Deep Adaptation is part of a wider public conversation about the increasing frequency and severity of extreme weather events, global food insecurity, and the existential threats they pose. Several authors have asserted that whether one takes the pessimistic view of Deep Adaptation for the likelihood of societal collapse or a more optimistic view, the Deep Adaptation response of love-based action is appropriate, so that pessimists and optimists should work together.

The topic of societal collapse can generate overwhelming emotional responses. Bendell and Carr have sought to constructively address these strong emotions.

In France, publication of the book Comment tout peut s’effondrer (How Everything Can Collapse) established the interdisciplinary field of study called collapsology, which embraces Deep Adaptation. The majority of the general public in France regard societal collapse as likely "in the coming years." Collapsologists note that factors in addition to climate disruption may contribute to societal collapse. They argue that even if one regards an existential risk as small, still prudence demands one prepare for it.

The Deep Adaptation community is mostly white, well-educated, and middle to upper class, and is working to diversify and decolonialize. Gesturing Toward Decolonial Futures (GTDF), a collective of academics, activists and indigenous people, have engaged Deep Adaptation. GTDF includes people who are already living through, or in the aftermath of, societal collapses, and have perspectives and resources for “the challenging work that we need to do together as we collectively face the gradual collapse of the house of modernity, or, in other words, the end of the world as we know it.”

== Impact ==
Deep Adaptation and its framework of resilience, relinquishment, restoration, and reconciliation to reduce harm from climate and ecological devastation are being proposed for a variety of practical approaches to climate adaptation. Areas in which Deep Adaptation has been discussed include maritime economics.

Political scientist Joost de Moor notes that while Deep Adaptation and related "post-apocalyptic narratives" are becoming increasingly prevalent within climate change activist movements, they are often marginalized in strategy-making. Bendell and Deep Adaptation have been influential in Extinction Rebellion. The XR Handbook "spells out a broad call for adaptation, including not just material interventions to alleviate specific climate risks, but also social, economic, political and cultural adaptation that radically restructures society in the face of futures characterized by climate disruptions."

Deep Adaptation has been cited by several mental health professionals as a framework and community for addressing climate anxiety and ecological distress. A clinical social worker in Seattle states that "Organizations such as the Good Grief Network, the Deep Adaptation Forum and others have cropped up in the past several years to offer support and education about the climate crisis, and to inspire political action.” Noting the need for large-scale interventions to aid the large numbers of people experiencing climate distress, psychiatrists Beth Marks and Janet Lewis cite the Deep Adaptation community as a resource for those people. They note that:

[Deep Adaptation] seeks to develop so-called collapse-readiness (ie, creating an equitable system for distribution of life essentials such as food, water, energy, and health care) and collapse-transcendence (fostering psycho-social-spiritual-cultural shifts to accept and live through collapse with some composure and stability).

Social worker and educator Caroline Hicks speaks of providing a Deep Adaptation perspective, to help people understand their climate-related distress and grief as legitimate, and to empower them to act.

Buddhist scholar and ecological activist Joanna Macy, with professor Sean Kelly, characterize “speaking the truth” of Deep Adaptation as “like a tonic.” They now expect the inevitability of collapse, and they are compelled ethically to act “to ensure a softer landing, to minimize suffering, and to save what can be saved…”

== See also ==
- Post-doom
