= Valérie Cabanes =

French lawyer and environmentalist

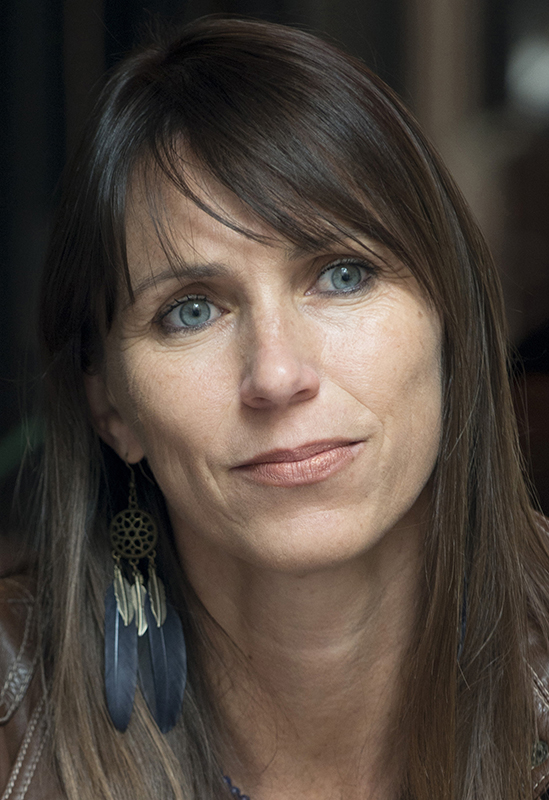
- Born: 1969 (age 56–57); Pont-l'Abbé

Valérie Cabanes (born 1969) is a French lawyer and environmentalist. She is noted as a proponent of the idea of ecocide as a new crime under international law.

== Life ==
Cabanes was born in Pont-l'Abbé in Brittany in 1969. From 2006 to 2012, she was involved in defending the rights of indigenous peoples in Canada and Brazil, producing reports that were debated at the United Nations Human Rights Council and the European Parliament.

She became a lawyer specialising in international law. In 2013, she began her own campaign to get ecocide recognised as a cime under international law. This objective would require recognition that damage to an ecosystem was a crime and it would include the idea of damage to things that do not belong to anyone. Objects which are said to be commons like Antarctica, the atmosphere or seawater could also be damaged by ecocide. In her opinion, an international crime of ecocide could be used to dissolve companies who endangering our planet of to bring the heads of companies to account.

In 2016, she published her work "Un nouveau droit pour la Terre. Pour en finir avec l'écocide: Pour en finir avec l'écocide".

In 2018 she joined a legal team who sued the government of France for not dealing with climate change as quickly as they should. In February 2021, the courts found that the government had not kept to its carbon budgets and it was culpable. Moreover the courts ruled that the government should take "all useful measures" to recover the position before the end of 2022.

Cabanes was one of the founders of the group End Ecocide on Earth. Ecocide (destroying one's home) is a concept that is proposed as a new international crime.
