= Victoria Loorz =

Author, ecospiritual director, and co-founder of the Wild Church Network

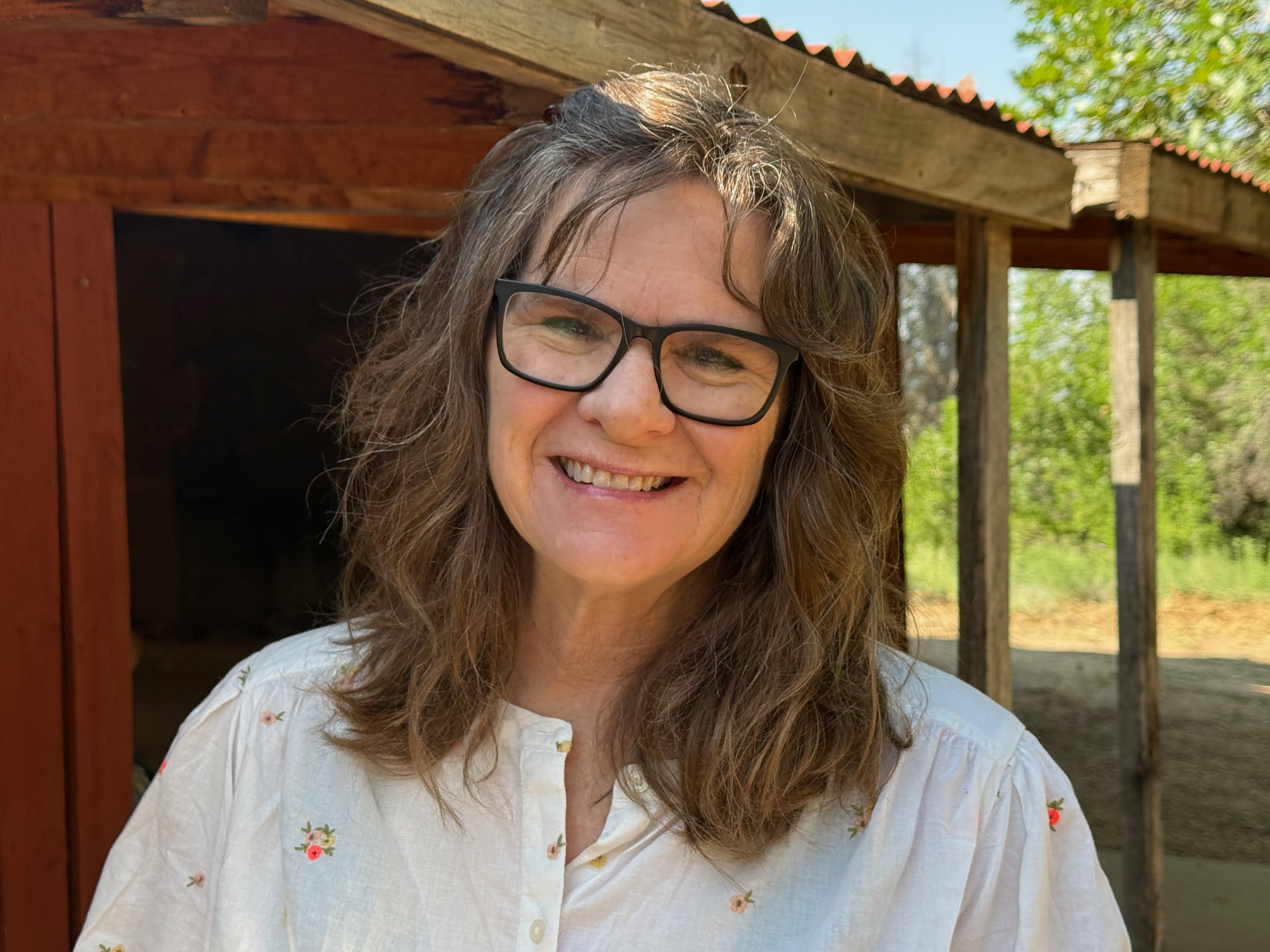
- Occupations: author, ecospiritual director, and co-founder of the Wild Church Network
- Organization: Center for Wild Spirituality
- Known for: ecospirituality, Wild Church
- Notable work: Church of the Wild
- Children: Alec Loorz, Olivia Loorz

Victoria Loorz is an author, ecospiritual director, and co-founder of the Wild Church Network.

== Career ==
Victoria Loorz started her work as a minister, who increasingly found herself connecting to the natural world in a way that seemed counter to the congregational expectations. Leaving institutional Christianity, she co-founded the Wild Church Network, an informal, global community of people who celebrate the divine through gathering outdoors in natural settings.

After helping her son Alec Loorz in his teen-age crusade against climate change and her grassroots efforts develop and support wild churches, Victoria went on to write the Church of the Wild, a text that challenged institutional religion which separated humanity from nature.

Loorz continues to write and develop her work on human connections and kindship with the natural world through the Center for Wild Spirituality and the Seminary of the Wild Earth.

== See also ==
- Ecospirituality
- Ecopsychology
- Religion and environmentalism
- Religious naturalism
