= Doomer =

Person pessimistic or fatalistic about global problems

The Doomer Wojak

Doomer is a 21st-century neologism for an online subculture of people who share extremely pessimistic, nihilist or fatalistic views about global problems such as overpopulation, peak oil, ecological overshoot, pollution, nuclear weapons, democratic backsliding, economic collapse, and runaway artificial intelligence. Some doomers believe these problems may lead to societal collapse, or even worse, human extinction. The terms doomer and doomerism arose primarily on social media and later experienced a semantic change, becoming Internet slang for pessimism while overlapping with the incel subculture and blackpill.

Malthusians like Paul R. Ehrlich, Guy McPherson and Michael Ruppert have related doomerism to Malthusianism, an economic philosophy holding that human resource use will eventually exceed resource availability, leading to societal collapse, social unrest, or population decline.

== History ==
=== Peaknik subculture ===
The term doomer was reported in 2008 as being used in early internet peaknik communities, as on internet forums where members discussed the theorized point in time when oil extraction would stop due to lack of resources, followed by societal collapse. Mid-2000s doomers embraced various ideas on how to face this impending collapse, including doomsday prepping, as well as more contemporary feelings of resignation and defeat.

Canadian self-identified doomer Paul Chefurka hosted a website where he encouraged his readers to eat lower on the food chain, modify their homes for the apocalypse, and to consider not having children. Not all "peakniks" subscribed to a fatalist outlook. U.S. Army Ranger Chris Lisle, when writing recommendations on how to survive the societal collapse, suggested that fellow doomers "adopt a positive attitude," because, as he put it, "Hard times don't last, hard people do."

=== Internet meme ===
By 2018, 4chan users had begun creating Wojak caricatures with the -oomer suffix, derived from "boomer", to mock various groups online. One of these caricatures was the "Doomer", a 20-something who had "simply stopped trying". The meme first appeared on 4chan's /r9k/ board in September 2018. The image typically depicts the wojak character in dark clothing, including a dark beanie, smoking a cigarette. "Doomer"-themed playlists, featuring this wojak along with slowed down music edits (often involving post-punk or rock) reached popularity on YouTube, especially during the Covid-19 lockdowns. The archetype often embodies nihilism and despair, with a belief in the incipient end of the world to causes ranging from climate apocalypse to peak oil to (more locally) opioid addiction. Kaitlyn Tiffany writes in The Atlantic that the doomer meme depicts young men who "are no longer pursuing friendships or relationships, and get no joy from anything because they know that the world is coming to an end."

A related meme format, "doomer girl", began appearing on 4chan in January 2020, and it soon moved to other online communities, including Reddit, Twitter, and Tumblr, often by women claiming it from its 4chan origins. This format is described by The Atlantic as "a quickly sketched cartoon woman with black hair, black clothes, and sad eyes ringed with red makeup". The doomer girl character often appears in image macros interacting with the original doomer character. The format is often compared to rage comics.

=== Doomer wave ===
Doomer wave
- Other names: Doomerwave; Doomer
- Stylistic origins: Vaporwave; post-punk; darkwave; Russian post-punk; slowed and reverb
- Cultural origins: 2010s, United States

Other topics
- Incelcore; mallwave

Doomer wave (also known as doomerwave or simply doomer) is an online music microgenre coined by anonymous users on 4chan in 2018 to describe an offshoot of the Wojak meme known as "doomer wojak". The style was originally associated with slowed down versions of depressive tracks as inspired by the vaporwave microgenre. Writer Cat Zhang of Pitchfork described the "doomer" as "a nihilistic, 20-something male whose despair about the world causes him to retreat from traditional society". The term later expanded to encompass the "doomer girl" archetype. In 2020, Belarusian post-punk band Molchat Doma garnered internet virality through online memes and playlists which referred to them as "Russian doomer music" or "doomer wave" (despite the band's Belarusian origin). Zhang further stated, "Perhaps we could think of Molchat Doma's synth-specked post-punk as a nighttime counterpart to the vaporwave subgenre 'mallwave', which sounds like a eulogy to the lost promise of suburban idyll."

=== In media ===
The term doomer was popularized outside of the Internet in commentary surrounding Jonathan Franzen's 2019 essay in The New Yorker titled "What if We Stopped Pretending?". The piece made an argument against the possibility of averting climatic catastrophe. In addition to popularizing the term among general audiences, Franzen's piece was highly popular among online Doomer communities, including the Facebook groups Near Term Human Extinction Support Group and Abrupt Climate Change.

The BBC describes sustainability professor Jem Bendell's self-published paper Deep Adaptation: A Map for Navigating Climate Tragedy as "the closest thing to a manifesto for a generation of self-described 'climate doomers'". As of March 2020, the paper had been downloaded more than a half-million times. In it, Bendell claims there is no chance to avert a near-term breakdown in human civilization, but that people must instead prepare to live with and prepare for the effects of climate change.

Climate scientist Michael E. Mann described Bendell's paper as "pseudo-scientific nonsense", saying Bendell's "doomist framing" was a "dangerous new strain of crypto-denialism" that would "lead us down the very same path of inaction as outright climate change denial". An essay published on OpenDemocracy argues that the paper is an example of "climate doomism" that "relies heavily on misinterpreted climate science".

Michael Mann has also listed David Wallace Wells's framing of the climate crisis, which he presents in "The Uninhabitable Earth" and The Uninhabitable Earth: Life After Warming, as being among "the prominent doomist narratives."

Uncivilization: The Dark Mountain Manifesto, published in 2009 by Paul Kingsnorth and Dougald Hine to signal the beginning of the artists' group the Dark Mountain Project, critiques the idea of progress. According to The New York Times, critics called Kingsnorth and his sympathizers "doomers", "nihilists", and "crazy polypiarians".

Kate Knibbs, writing in Wired, described the development of a popular and growing strain of "doomer" climate fiction, in contrast to the typically optimistic undertones of the genre. Amy Brady, a climate fiction columnist for the Chicago Review of Books, says the genre has moved from future scenarios to near-past and present stories.

== See also ==
- Blackpill
- Cornucopianism – Ideological position in futurism
- Ecological grief – Anguish in response to ecological loss
- Millenarianism – Belief in a coming fundamental transformation of society
- Myth of Progress – Movement towards a desired state
- Tang ping – Chinese neologism, "lying flat"
- Pessimism porn
- Pessimism § Technological and environmental
