= Climate change and civilizational collapse =

Discussion of scenarios for a collapse of civilization due to climate change

Climate change and civilizational collapse refers to a hypothetical risk that the negative impacts of climate change might reduce global socioeconomic complexity to the point that complex human civilization effectively ends around the world, with humanity reduced to a less developed state. This hypothetical risk is typically associated with the idea of a massive reduction of the human population caused by the direct and indirect impacts of climate change, as well as a permanent reduction of Earth's carrying capacity. Finally, it is sometimes suggested that a civilizational collapse caused by climate change would soon lead to human extinction.

Some researchers connect historical examples of societal collapse with adverse changes in local and/or global weather patterns. In particular, the 4.2-kiloyear event, a millennial-scale megadrought which took place in Africa and Asia between 5,000 and 4,000 years ago, has been linked with the collapse of the Old Kingdom in Egypt, the Akkadian Empire in Mesopotamia, the Liangzhu culture in the lower Yangtze River area and the Indus Valley Civilization. In Europe, the General Crisis of the Seventeenth Century, which was defined by events such as crop failure and the Thirty Years' War, took place during the Little Ice Age. In 2011, a general connection was proposed between adverse climate variations and long-term societal crises during the preindustrial times. Drought might have been a contributing factor to the Classic Maya collapse between the 7th and 9th centuries. However, all of these events were limited to individual human societies: a collapse of the entire human civilization would be historically unprecedented.

Some of the more extreme warnings of civilizational collapse caused by climate change, such as a claim that civilization is highly likely to end by 2050, have attracted strong rebuttals from scientists. The 2022 IPCC Sixth Assessment Report projects that human population would be in a range between 8.5 billion and 11 billion people (median - 9.75 billion people) by 2050. By the year 2100, the median population projection is at 11 billion people, while the maximum population projection is close to 16 billion people. The lowest projection for 2100 is around 7 billion, and this decline from present levels is primarily attributed to "rapid development and investment in education", with those projections associated with some of the highest levels of economic growth. However, a minority of climate scientists have argued that higher levels of warming—between about 3 °C (5.4 °F) to 5 °C (9.0 °F) over preindustrial temperatures—may be incompatible with civilization, or that the lives of several billion people could no longer be sustained in such a world. In 2022, they have called for a so-called "climate endgame" research agenda into the probability of these risks, which had attracted significant media attention and some scientific controversy.

Some of the most high-profile writing on climate change and civilizational collapse has been written by non-scientists. Notable examples include "The Uninhabitable Earth" by David Wallace-Wells and "What if we stopped pretending?" by Jonathan Franzen, which were both criticized for scientific inaccuracy. Opinion polling has provided evidence that youths across the world experience widespread climate anxiety, with the term collapsology being coined in 2015 to describe a pessimistic worldview anticipating civilizational collapse due to climate anxiety.

== Suggested historical examples ==
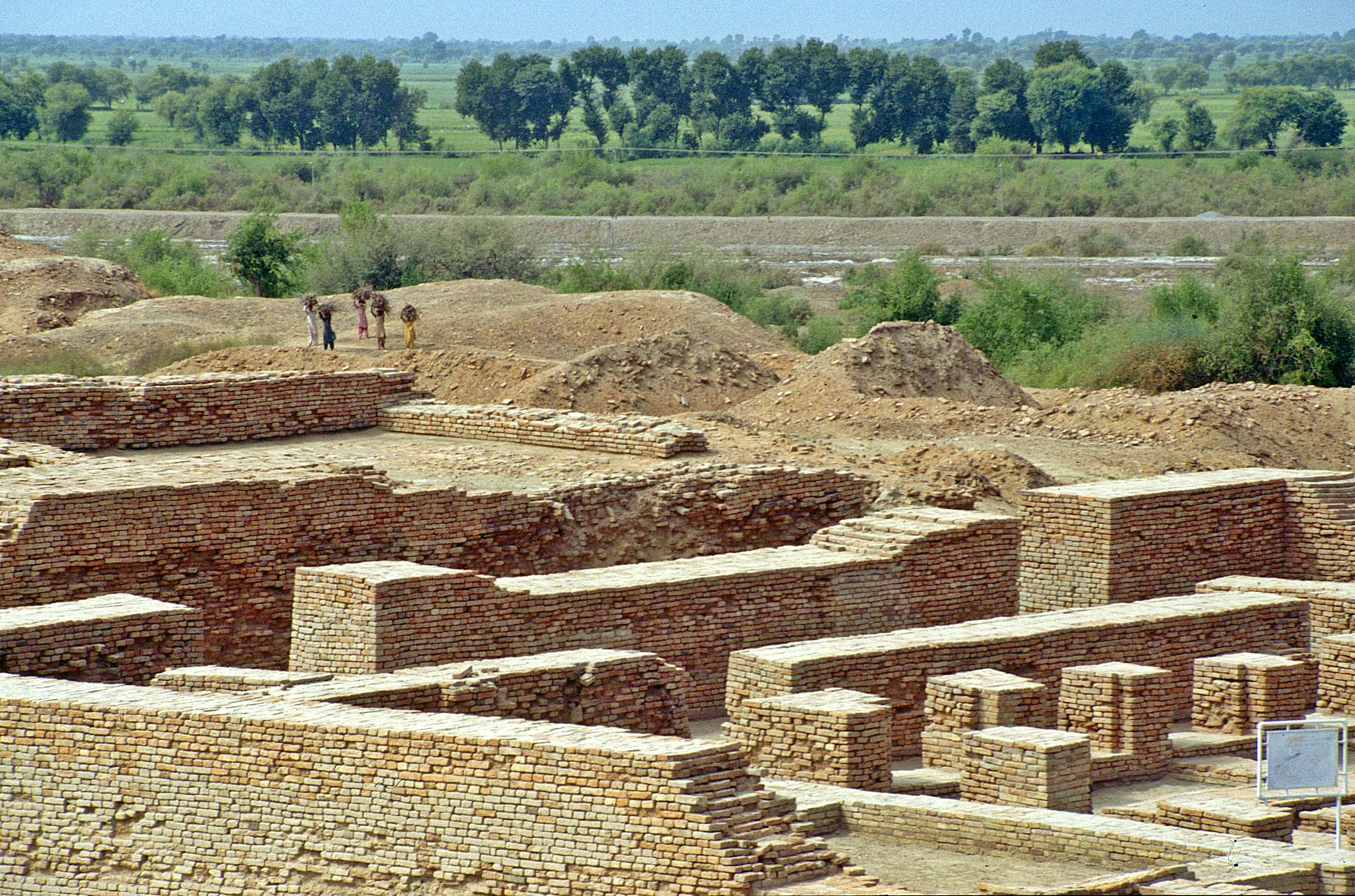
Ruins of Mohenjo-daro on the Indus River in Pakistan

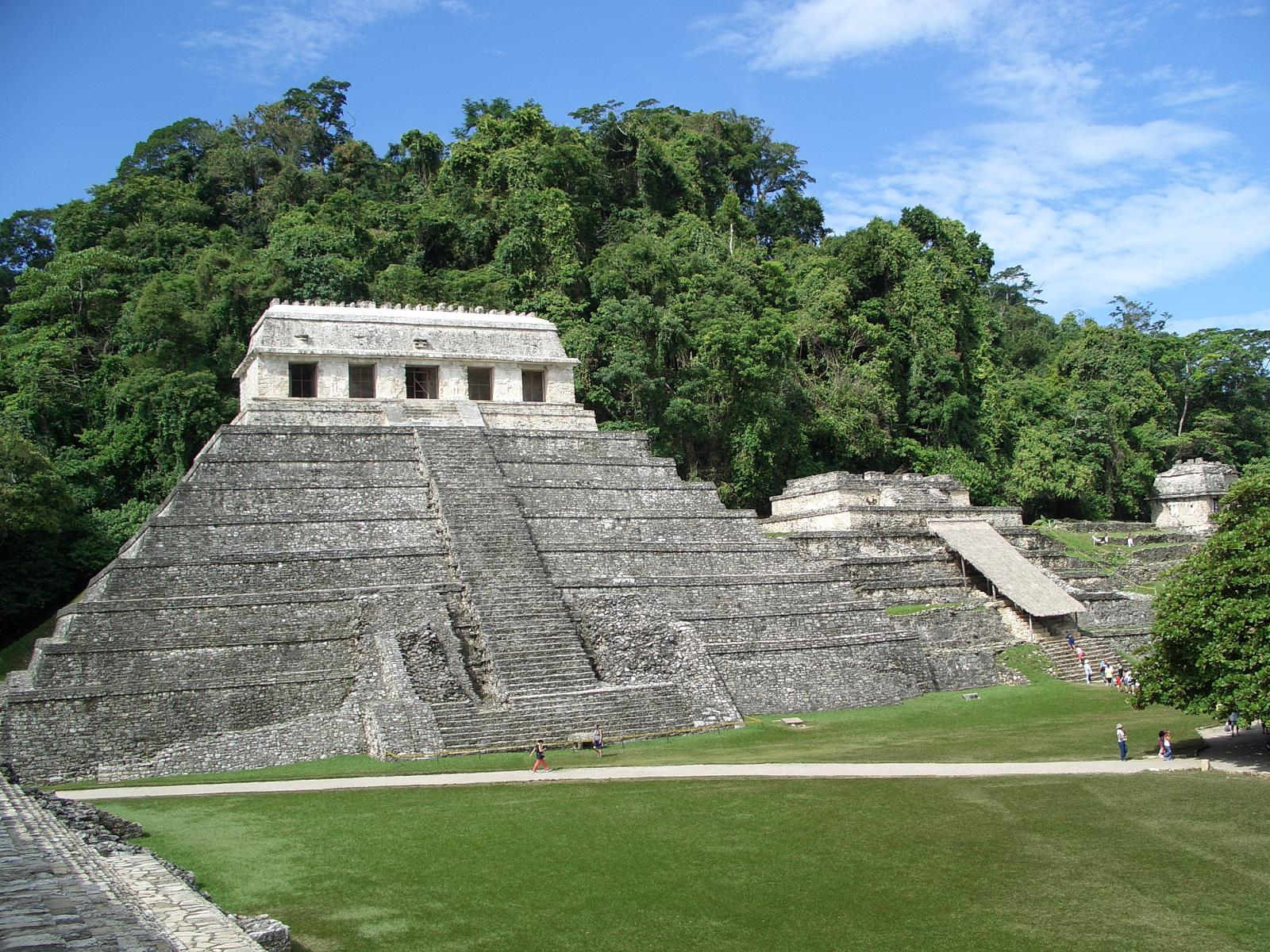
The Mayan ruins of Palenque. Drought might have been a contributing factor to the Classic Maya collapse between the 7th and 9th centuries.

Archeologists have identified signs of a megadrought which lasted for a millennium between 5,000 and 4,000 years ago in Africa and Asia. The drying of the Green Sahara not only turned it into a desert but also disrupted the monsoon seasons in South and Southeast Asia and caused flooding in East Asia, which prevented successful harvests and the development of complex culture. It coincided with and may have caused the decline and the fall of the Akkadian Empire in Mesopotamia and the Indus Valley Civilization. The dramatic shift in climate is known as the 4.2-kiloyear event.

The highly advanced Indus Valley Civilization took root around 3000 BC in what is now northwestern India and Pakistan and collapsed around 1700 BC. Since the Indus script has yet to be deciphered, the causes of its de-urbanization remain a mystery, but there is some evidence pointing to natural disasters. Signs of a gradual decline began to emerge in 1900 BC, and two centuries later, most of the cities had been abandoned. Archeological evidence suggests an increase in interpersonal violence and in infectious diseases like leprosy and tuberculosis.

Volcanic eruptions can abruptly influence the climate. During a large eruption, sulfur dioxide (SO_{2}) is expelled into the stratosphere, where it could stay for years and gradually get oxidized into sulfate aerosols. Being highly reflective, sulfate aerosols reduce the incident sunlight and cool the Earth's surface. By drilling into glaciers and ice sheets, scientists can access the archives of the history of atmospheric composition. A team of multidisciplinary researchers led by Joseph McConnell of the Desert Research Institute in Reno, Nevada deduced that a volcanic eruption occurred in 43 BC, a year after the assassination of Julius Caesar on the Ides of March (15 March) in 44 BC, which left a power vacuum and led to bloody civil wars.

Rome's interest in Egypt as a source of food intensified, and the aforementioned problems and civil unrest weakened Egypt's ability to resist. Egypt came under Roman rule after Cleopatra committed suicide in 30 BC. While it is difficult to say for certain whether Egypt would have become a Roman province if Okmok volcano, in modern-day Alaska had not erupted, the eruption likely hastened the process.

== Modern discussion ==
=== 2000s ===
As early as in 2004, a book titled Ecocriticism explored the connection between apocalypticism as expressed in religious contexts, and the secular apocalyptic interpretations of climate and environmental issues. It argued that the tragic (preordained, with clearly delineated morality) or comic (focused on human flaws as opposed to inherent inevitability) apocalyptic framing was seen in the past works on environment, such as Rachel Carson's Silent Spring (1962), Paul and Anne Ehrlich's The Population Bomb (1972), and Al Gore's Earth in the Balance (1992).

In the mid-2000s, James Lovelock gave predictions to the British newspapers The Independent and The Guardian, where he suggested that much of Europe will have turned to desert and "billions of us will die and the few breeding pairs of people that survive will be in the Arctic where the climate remains tolerable" by the end of the 21st century. In 2008, he was quoted in The Guardian as saying that 80% of humans would perish by 2100, and that the climate change responsible for that will last 100,000 years. By 2012, he admitted that climate change had proceeded slower than he expected.

=== 2010s–present ===
In late 2010s, several articles have attracted attention for their predictions of apocalyptic impacts caused by climate change. Firstly, there was "The Uninhabitable Earth", a July 2017 New York magazine article by David Wallace-Wells, which had become the most-read story in the history of the magazine, and was later adapted into a book. Another was "What if we stopped pretending?", an article written for The New Yorker by Jonathan Franzen in September 2019. Both articles were heavily criticized by the fact-checking organization Climate Feedback for the numerous inaccuracies about tipping points in the climate system and other aspects of climate change research.

Other examples of this genre include "What Comes After the Coming Climate Anarchy?", a year 2022 article for TIME magazine by Parag Khanna, which had asserted that hundreds of millions of people dying in the upcoming years and the global population standing at 6 billion by the year 2050 was a plausible worst-case scenario. Further, some reports, such as "the 2050 scenario" from the Australian Breakthrough – National Centre for Climate Restoration and the self-published Deep Adaptation paper by Jem Bendell had attracted substantial media coverage by making allegations that the outcomes of climate change are underestimated by the conventional scientific process. Those reports did not go through the peer review process, and the scientific assessment of these works finds them of very low credibility.

Notably, subsequent writing by David Wallace-Wells had stepped back from the claims he made in either version of The Uninhabitable Earth. In 2022, he authored a feature article for The New York Times, which was titled "Beyond Catastrophe: A New Climate Reality Is Coming Into View". The following year, Kyle Paoletta argued in Harper's Magazine that the shift in tone made by David Wallace-Wells was indicative of a larger trend in media coverage of climate change taking place.

In October 2024, 44 climate scientists published an open letter to the Nordic Council of Ministers, claiming that according to scientific studies in the past few years, the risk of collapse of the Atlantic meridional overturning circulation had been greatly underestimated, that it could occur in the next few decades, and that some changes were already happening. Climate change may weaken the AMOC through increases in ocean heat content and elevated flows of freshwater from melting ice sheets. The collapse of the AMOC would be a severe climate catastrophe, resulting in a cooling of the Northern Hemisphere. It would have devastating and irreversible impacts especially for Nordic countries, but also for other parts of the world. Others disagree.

== Scientific consensus and controversy ==
The IPCC Sixth Assessment Report projects that human population would be in a range between 8.5 billion and 11 billion people (median average - 9.75 billion people) by 2050; the median population projection for the year 2100 is at 11 billion people, while the maximum population projection is close to 16 billion people. The lowest projection for 2100 is around 7 billion, and this decline from present levels is primarily attributed to "rapid development and investment in education", with those projections associated with some of the highest levels of economic growth. In November 2021, Nature surveyed the authors of the first part of the IPCC assessment report: out of 92 respondents, 88% have agreed that the world is experiencing a "climate crisis", yet when asked if they experience "anxiety, grief or other distress because of concerns over climate change?" just 40% answered "Yes, infrequently", with a further 21% responding "Yes, frequently", and the remaining 39% answering "No". Similarly, when a high-profile paper warning of "the challenges of avoiding a ghastly future" was published in Frontiers in Conservation Science, its authors have noted that "even if major catastrophes occur during this interval, they would unlikely affect the population trajectory until well into the 22nd Century", and "there is no way—ethically or otherwise (barring extreme and unprecedented increases in human mortality)—to avoid rising human numbers and the accompanying overconsumption."

Only a minority of publishing scientists have been more open to apocalyptic rhetoric. In 2009, Hans Joachim Schellnhuber, the Emeritus Director of the Potsdam Institute for Climate Impact Research, stated that if global warming reached 4 °C (7.2 °F) over the present levels, then the human population would likely be reduced to 1 billion. In 2015, he complained that this remark was frequently misinterpreted as a call for active human population control rather than a prediction. In a January 2019 interview for The Ecologist, he claimed that if people find reasons to give up on action, then there's a very big risk of things turning to an outright catastrophe, with the civilization ending and almost everything which had been built up over the past two thousand years destroyed.

In May 2019, The Guardian interviewed several climate scientists about a world where 4 °C (7.2 °F) of warming over the preindustrial has occurred by 2100: one of them was Johan Rockström, who was reported to state "It's difficult to see how we could accommodate a billion people or even half of that" in such a scenario. Around the same time, similar claims were made by the Extinction Rebellion activist Roger Hallam, who said in a 2019 interview that climate change may "kill 6 billion people by 2100"—a remark which was soon questioned by the BBC News presenter Andrew Neil and criticized as scientifically unfounded by Climate Feedback. In November 2019, the Guardian article was corrected, acknowledging that Rockström was misquoted and his real remarks were "It's difficult to see how we could accommodate eight billion people or maybe even half of that".

In 2022, the United Nations published a report called Global Assessment Report on Disaster Risk Reduction (GAR2022) saying societal collapse due to extensive crossing of planetary boundaries is possible. The UN report calls to preventive policies including incorporating planetary boundaries in the SDG targets. Allegedly, a senior advisor to the UN Office for Disaster Risk Reduction and contributor to the Global Assessment Report who spoke to Byline Times on condition of anonymity said, that the report was strongly censored before being published, so that "The GAR2022 is an eviscerated skeleton of what was included in earlier drafts". However, the study which mentioned this possibility and was included in GAR2022 was a scenario study with no actual measurements or timescales.

Generally, the number of scientific studies dealing with societal collapse from climate change is rising.

=== Climate endgame ===
In August 2022, Schellnhuber, Rockström and several other researchers, many of whom were associated with Centre for the Study of Existential Risk at the University of Cambridge, have published a paper in PNAS which argued that a lack of what they called "integrated catastrophe assessment" meant that the risk of societal collapse, or even eventual human extinction caused by climate change and its interrelated impacts such as famine (crop loss, drought), extreme weather (hurricanes, floods), war (caused by the scarce resources), systemic risk (relating to migration, famine, or conflict), and disease was "dangerously underexplored". The paper suggested that the following terms should be actively used in the future research.

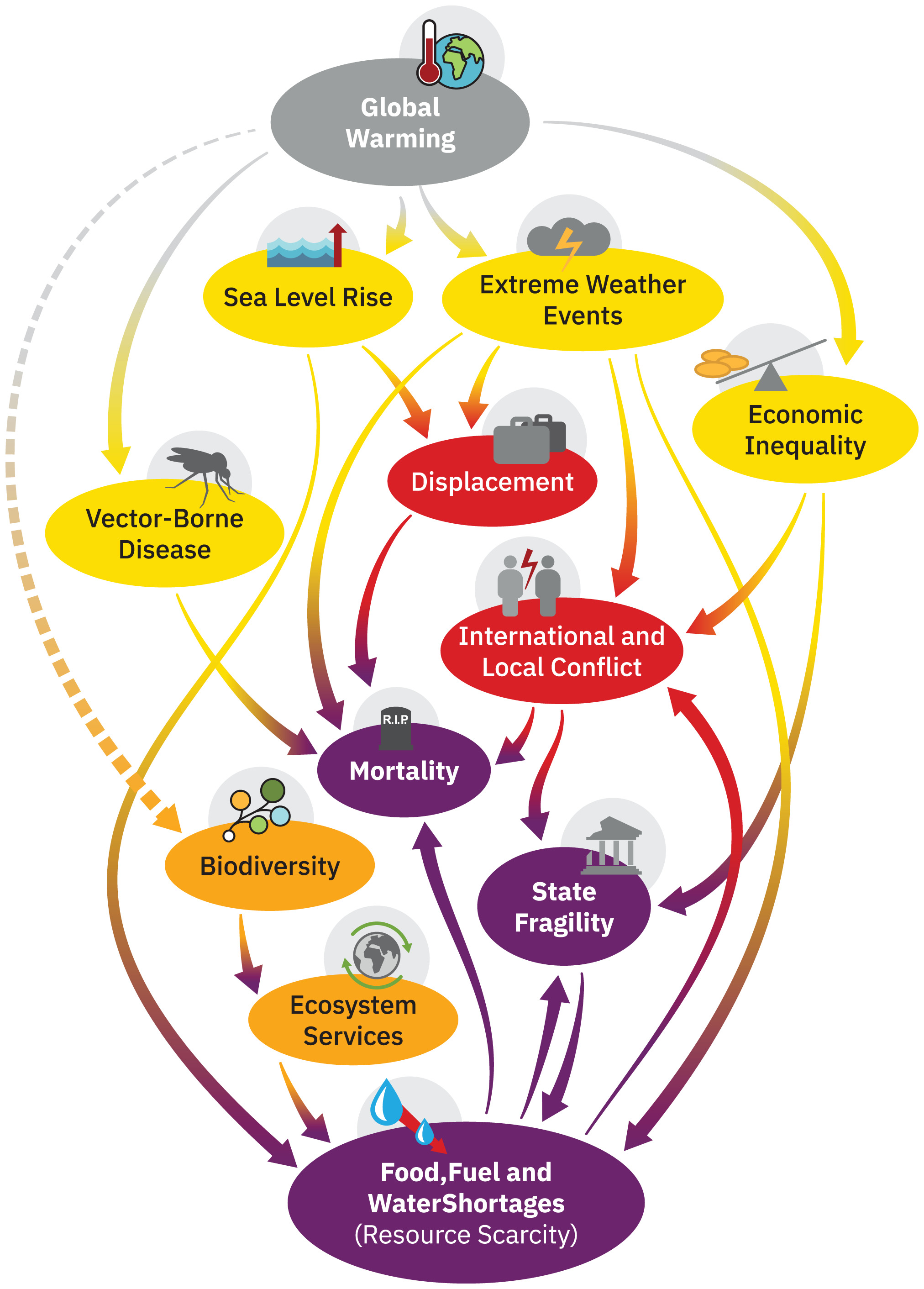
Conceptual causal loop diagram of cascading global climate failure used in the "Climate endgame" paper

Defining key terms in the Climate Endgame agenda
Term	Definition
Latent risk	Risk that is dormant under one set of conditions but becomes active under another set of conditions.
Risk cascade	Chains of risk occurring when an adverse impact triggers a set of linked risks.
Systemic risk	The potential for individual disruptions or failures to cascade into a system-wide failure.
Extreme climate change	Mean global surface temperature rise of 3 °C (5.4 °F) or more above preindustrial levels by 2100.
Extinction risk	The probability of human extinction within a given timeframe.
Extinction threat	A plausible and significant contributor to total extinction risk.
Societal fragility	The potential for smaller damages to spiral into global catastrophic or extinction risk due to societal vulnerabilities, risk cascades, and maladaptive responses.
Societal collapse	Significant sociopolitical fragmentation and/or state failure along with the relatively rapid, enduring, and significant loss capital, and systems identity; this can lead to large-scale increases in mortality and morbidity.
Global catastrophic risk	The probability of a loss of 25% of the global population and the severe disruption of global critical systems (such as food) within a given timeframe (years or decades).
Global catastrophic threat	A plausible and significant contributor to global catastrophic risk; the potential for climate change to be a global catastrophic threat can be referred to as "catastrophic climate change".
Global decimation risk	The probability of a loss of 10% (or more) of global population and the severe disruption of global critical systems (such as food) within a given timeframe (years or decades).
Global decimation threat	A plausible and significant contributor to global decimation risk.
Endgame territory	Levels of global warming and societal fragility that are judged sufficiently probable to constitute climate change as an extinction threat.
Worst-case warming	The highest empirically and theoretically plausible level of global warming.

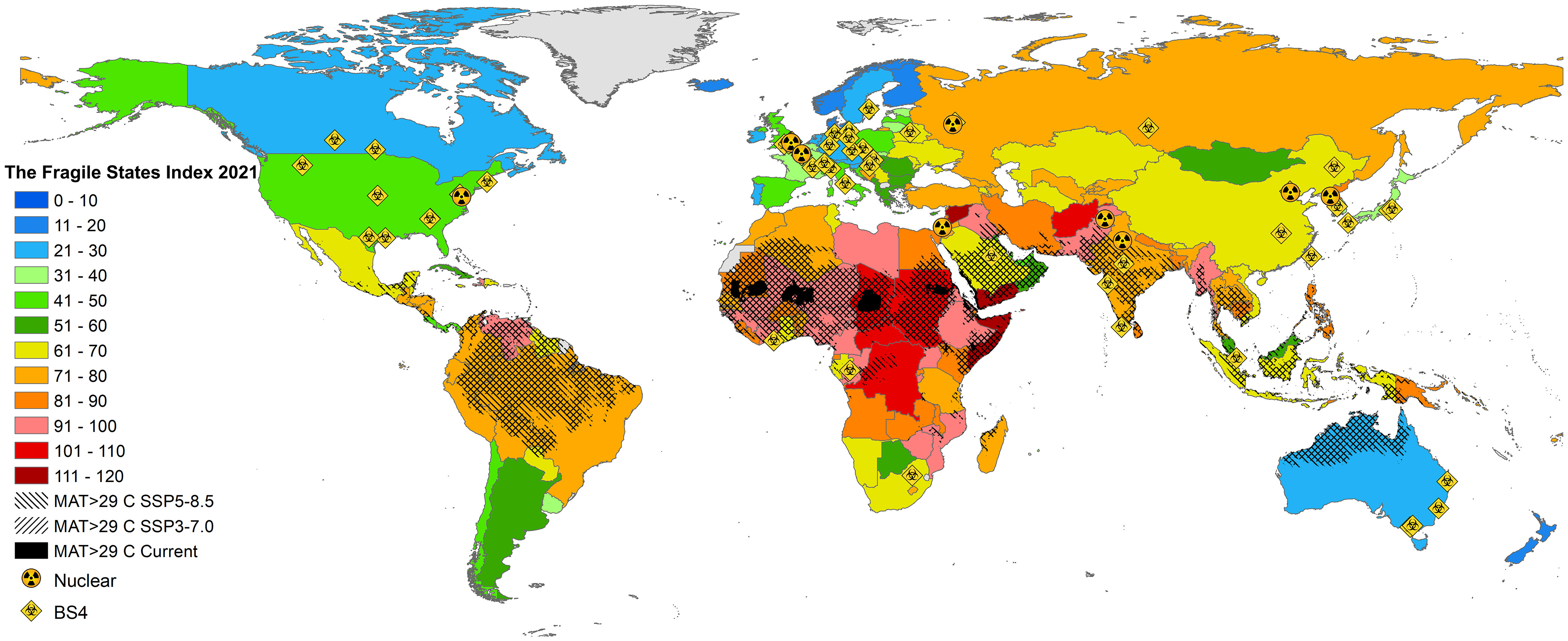
Overlap between state fragility, extreme heat, and nuclear and biological catastrophic hazards according to the "Endgame" paper

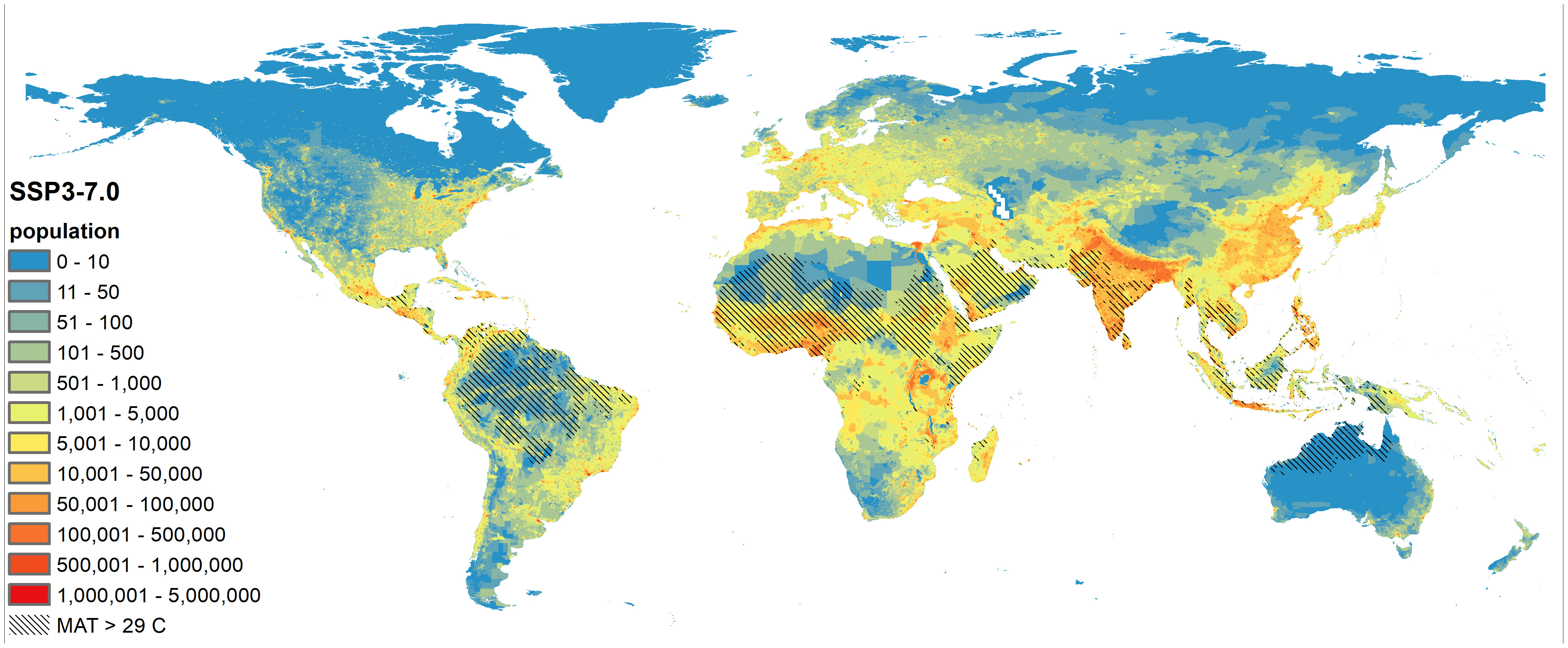
Overlap between future population distribution and extreme heat according to the same paper This graphic was criticized for using a scenario considered unlikely and worse than the present trajectory.

The paper was very high-profile, receiving extensive media coverage and over 180,000 page views by 2023. It was also the subject of several response papers from other scientists, all of which were also published at PNAS. Most have welcomed its proposals while disagreeing on some of the details of the suggested agenda. However, a response paper authored by Roger Pielke Jr. and fellow University of Colorado Boulder researchers Matthew Burgess and Justin Ritchie was far more critical. They have argued that one of the paper's main arguments—the supposed lack of research into higher levels of global warming—was baseless, as on the contrary, the scenarios of highest global warming called RCP 8.5 and SSP5-8.5 have accounted for around half of all mentions in the "impacts" section of the IPCC Sixth Assessment Report, and SSP3-7, the scenario of slightly lower warming used in some of the paper's graphics, had also assumed greater emissions and more extensive coal use than what had been projected by the International Energy Agency. They have also argued that just as the past projections of overpopulation were used to justify one-child policy in China, a disproportionate focus on apocalyptic scenarios may be used to justify despotism and fascist policies. In response, the authors of the original paper wrote that in their view, catastrophic risks may occur even at lower levels of warming due to risks involving human responses and societal fragility. They also suggested that instead of the one-child policy, a better metaphor for responses to extreme risks research would be the 1980s exploration of the impacts of nuclear winter, which had spurred nuclear disarmament efforts.

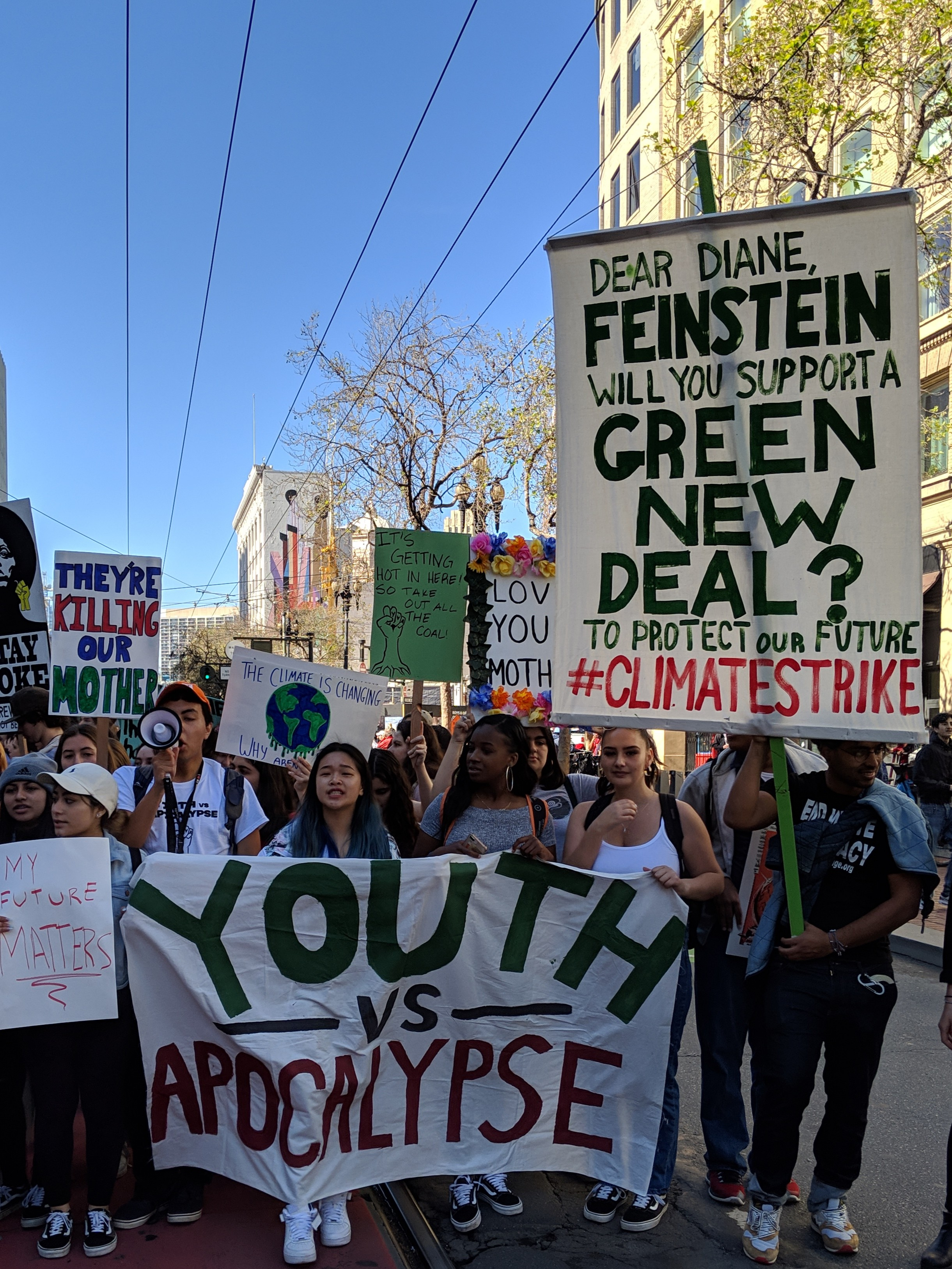
"Youth vs Apocalypse" banner seen at San Francisco Youth Climate Strike in 2019

=== Timescale ===
Bill McGuire (a professor of Geophysical and Climate Hazards and the author of Hothouse Earth: An Inhabitant's Guide) suggest that the collapse may occur by 2050.

A study published in the Yale Journal of Industrial Ecology in the year of 2020, suggest that "current business-as-usual trajectory of global civilization is heading toward the terminal decline of economic growth within the coming decade—and at worst, could trigger societal collapse by around 2040".

== Public opinion ==
Some public polling shows that beliefs in civilizational collapse or even human extinction have become widespread amongst the general population in many countries. In 2021, a publication in The Lancet surveyed 10,000 people aged 16–25 years in ten countries (Australia, Brazil, Finland, France, India, Nigeria, Philippines, Portugal, the UK, and the US): one of its findings was 55% of respondents agreeing with the statement "humanity is doomed".

In 2020, a survey by a French think tank Jean Jaurès Foundation found that in five developed countries (France, Germany, Italy, the UK and the US), a significant fraction of the population agreed with the statement that "civilization as we know it will collapse in the years to come"; the percentages ranged from 39% in Germany and 52% or 56% in the US and the UK to 65% in France and 71% in Italy.

== See also ==
- Anoxic event
- Earth 2100
- Human extinction#Risk estimates
- Late Bronze Age collapse
- Classic Maya collapse
- Migration era
