= Confessions of a Recovering Environmentalist =

Collection of essays by Paul Kingsnorth

- Author: Paul Kingsnorth
- Language: English
- Genre: non-fiction
- Publisher: Graywolf Press
- Publication date: 1 August 2017
- Pages: 208
- ISBN: 978-1555977801

Confessions of a Recovering Environmentalist is a collection of essays by Paul Kingsnorth published in 2017.

== Synopsis ==
Much of the book recounts Kingsnorth's personal history with the environmental movement and with nature. He starts the book with a description of his upbringing, his engagement with the Dongas road protest group, and with his engagement with environmentalism and journalism through his twenties. Kingsnorth then describes how he pivoted into a cynicism with mainstream environmentalism, a cynicism centered on what Kingsnorth feels is a "single-minded obsession with climate change" that "has trumped all other issues," resulting in "a curious, plastic world." He highlights some of the ways that this has occurred in England. Kingsnorth finished his book with a chapter titled The Eight Principles of Uncivilisation, which he presents as his manifesto in how to re-evaluate myths of progress and human centrality.

== Reception ==
In his review for The Guardian, Ian Jack argues that, while Kingsnorth's depiction of environmentalism seems reductionist and unfair, the author "writes insightfully about England - presciently, too." Jack describes the book as "Kingsnorth at his plainest and most provocative," noting that the tone of the book differs significantly from that of Kingsnorth's "romantic" work Uncivilization. Describing the work overall, Jack says, "Hope finds very little room in this enjoyable, sometimes annoying and mystical collection of essays."

Writing for Minnesota's Star Tribune, Scott Parker describes the perspective in Confessions as "refreshing in both a literary respect and an environmental one.... so radical that, if put into practice, it could effect meaningful preservation." However, when it comes to putting it into practice, Parker finds Kingsnorth's approach "somewhat disappointing... when Kingsnorth adopts the rhetorical cautiousness so common to contemporary environmental writing" when he upholds his ideas as an individual matter, not to be thrust upon readers or society at large. Though Parker finds Kingsnorth's worldview "much-needed," he finds his muted call for change useful in explaining "why Kingsnorth's critics call him a defeatist."
