= Guy McPherson =

American scientist

Guy R. McPherson
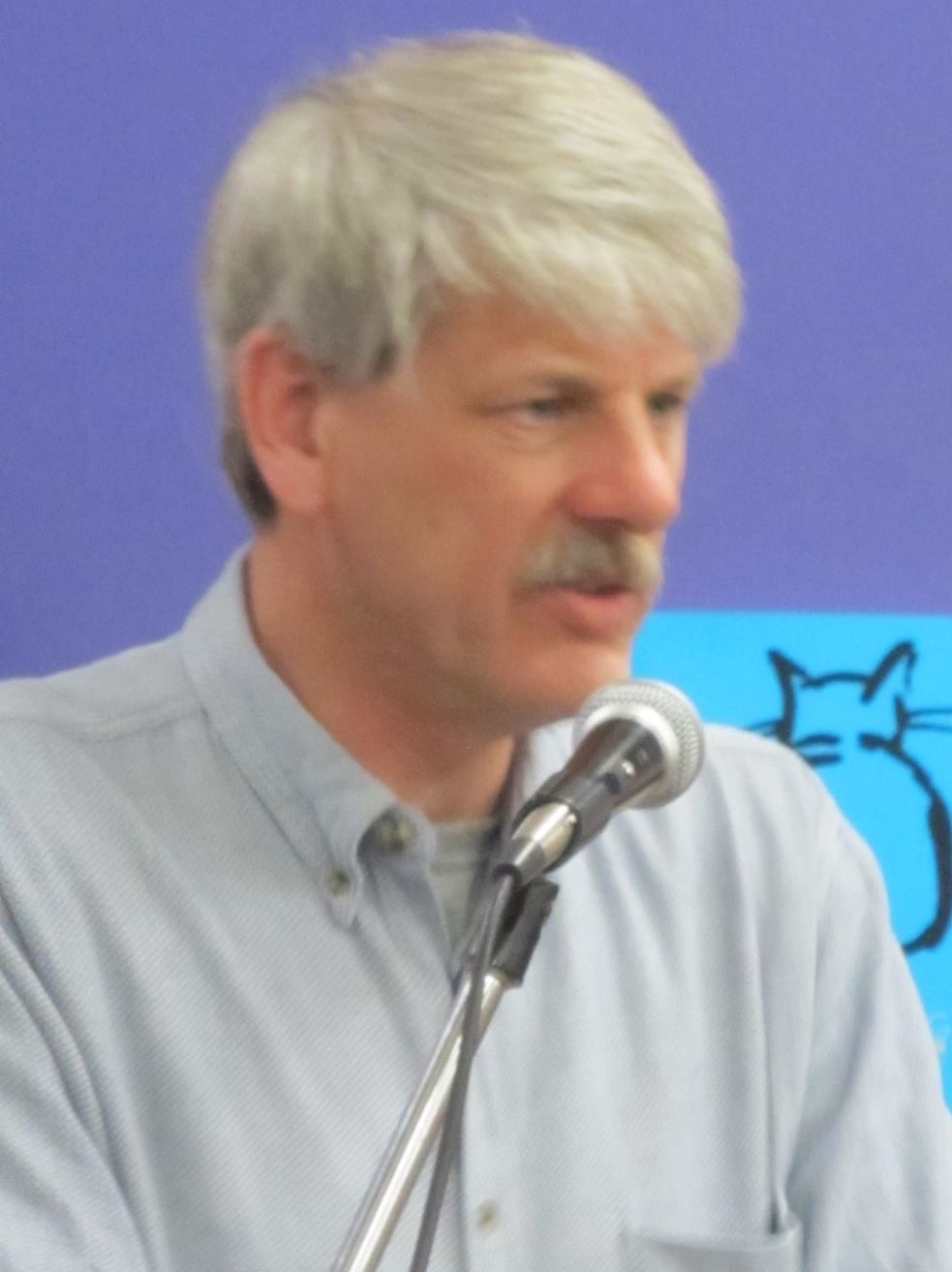
- McPherson in 2014
- Born: February 29, 1960 (age 66)
- Education: University of Idaho (B.S., 1982); Texas Tech University (M.S., PhD)
- Alma mater: University of Idaho
- Website: Official website

Guy R. McPherson (February 29, 1960) is an American scientist, professor emeritus of natural resources and ecology and evolutionary biology at the University of Arizona. He is known for inventing and promoting fringe theories (roughly synonymous with the term pseudo-scholarship) such as Near-Term Human Extinction (NTHE), which predicted human extinction by 2026.

== Biography ==
McPherson's career as a professor began at Texas A&M University, where he taught for one academic year. He taught for twenty years at the University of Arizona and other colleges in North America. McPherson has served as an expert witness for legal cases involving land management and wildfires. He has published more than 55 peer-reviewed publications. In May 2009, McPherson began living on an off-grid homestead in southern New Mexico. He then moved to Belize in July 2016. He moved to Westchester County, New York in October 2018.

In November 2015, McPherson was interviewed on National Geographic Explorer with host Bill Nye. Andrew Revkin in The New York Times said McPherson was an "apocalyptic ecologist ... who has built something of an 'End of Days' following." Michael Tobis, a climate scientist from the University of Wisconsin, said McPherson "is not the opposite of a denialist. He is a denialist, albeit of a different stripe." David Wallace-Wells writing in The Uninhabitable Earth (2019) called McPherson a "climate Gnostic" and on the "fringe," while climate scientist Michael E. Mann said he was a "doomist cult hero."

He has made a number of future predictions. In 2007, he predicted that due to peak oil there would be permanent blackouts in cities starting in 2012. In 2012, he predicted the "likely" extinction of humanity by 2030 due to climate change, and mass die-off by 2020 "for those living in the interior of a large continent." In 2018, he was quoted as predicting "that there will be no humans on Earth by 2026," which he based on "projections" of climate-change and species loss.

== Publications ==
- McPherson, G.R., D.D. Wade, and C.B. Phillips (compilers). 1990. Glossary of Fire Management Terms Used in the United States. Society of American Foresters, Bethesda, Maryland.
- McPherson, G.R. 1997. Ecology and Management of North American Savannas. University of Arizona Press, Tucson.
- McPherson, G.R. and S. DeStefano. 2003. Applied Ecology and Natural Resource Management. Cambridge University Press, Cambridge, England.
- Weltzin, J.F. and G.R. McPherson (editors). 2003. Changing Precipitation Regimes and Terrestrial Ecosystems. University of Arizona Press, Tucson.
- McPherson, G.R. 2004. Killing the Natives: Has the American Dream Become a Nightmare? Whitmore Publishing Company, Pittsburgh, Pennsylvania.
- McPherson, G.R. 2006. Letters to a Young Academic: Seeking Teachable Moments. Rowman & Littlefield Education, Lanham, Maryland.
- Brothers, Mac. 2006. Academic Pursuits. PublishAmerica, Baltimore, Maryland.
- Jensen, S.E. and G.R. McPherson. 2008. Living with Fire: Fire Ecology and Policy for the Twenty-first Century. University of California Press, Berkeley.
- Esparza, A.X. and G.R. McPherson (editors). 2009. The Planner's Guide to Natural Resource Conservation: The Science of Land Development Beyond the Metropolitan Fringe. Springer, New York.
- McPherson, G.R. 2011. Walking Away from Empire: A Personal Journey. PublishAmerica, Baltimore, Maryland.
- McPherson, G.R. 2013. Going Dark. PublishAmerica, Baltimore, Maryland.
- Baker, C. and G.R. McPherson. 2014. Extinction Dialogs: How to Live with Death in Mind. Tayen Lane Publishing.
- Schneider, P. and G.R. McPherson. 2015. Ms. Ladybug and Mr. Honeybee: A Love Story at the End of Time. America Star Books, Baltimore, Maryland.
- McPherson, G.R. 2019. Only Love Remains: Dancing at the Edge of Extinction. Woodthrush Productions, Pleasantville, New York.
- McPherson, G.R. 2019. "Becoming Hope-Free: Parallels Between Death of Individuals and Extinction of Homo sapiens" Clinical Psychology Forum, No 317, May 2019.
