= School of Everything =

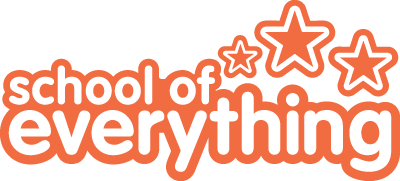
- Website type: Social enterprise, Education
- Available in: English
- Headquarters: London
- Founders: Dougald Hine, et al.
- Commercial: Yes
- Launched: 2007; 19 years ago
- Current status: Defunct

School of Everything was a website via which learners and teachers were able to search for each other.

== History ==
School of Everything was founded by Dougald Hine, Andy Gibson, Mary Harrington, Paul Miller, and Peter Brownell in 2006. The site was first funded by the Young Foundation.

It launched an alpha site in September 2007.

In April 2008, it received £350,000 in funding.

In 2008, it won a UK Catalyst award for the social use of technology and a New Statesman New Media Award.

In 2010, it was chosen by Becta and the Department for Business, Innovation and Skills as its new platform for adult informal learning in the UK.
