= Real England =

Travelogue

- First edition
- Author: Paul Kingsnorth
- Genre: travelogue
- Published: 2008
- Publisher: Portobello Books
- Pages: 320
- ISBN: 978-1-84627-042-0

Real England: The Battle Against the Bland is a 2008 travelogue written by Paul Kingsnorth describing his first-hand account of the homogenization of England through global market and industrial forces.

== Summary ==
Real England is a travelogue in which Kingsnorth discusses months of travel around England visiting publicans, shopkeepers, farmers, and other people in traditional English institutions. Kingsnorth explores the effects of global capitalism on English culture and character, highlighting what he sees as a flattening of the country by development, conglomeration, and privatization.

== Reception ==
Real England was Kingsnorth's first popularly successful book, garnering reviews in all major newspapers and citation in speeches by David Cameron and the archbishop of Canterbury.

Writing in The Guardian, Nicholas Lezard says of the book, "I occasionally say of a book that it is important, and that everyone should read it; this time I say so more emphatically than ever." Though Lezard notes, that "This is a very depressing book at times," Lezard highlights "the urgency of this book, and the need for us to stop being complacent."
