= Bramdean Common =

Valley near Winchester in Hampshire, England

Coordinates: 51.059°N 1.099°W

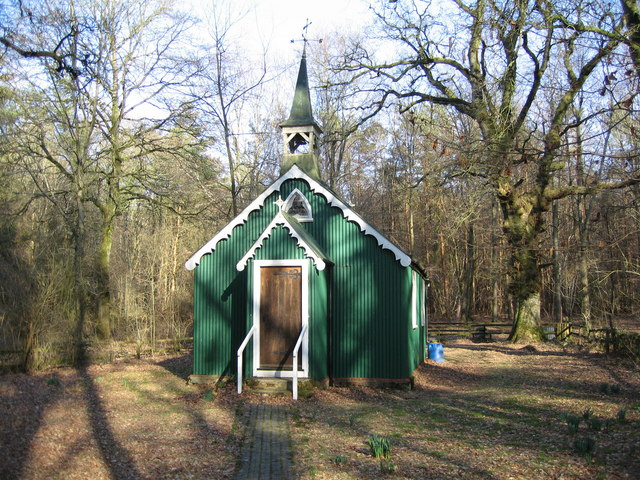
The Church in the Wood

Bramdean Common is situated in Bramdean, Hampshire, England. Bramdean Common is one of the many commons that served local parishioners and provided collectively owned lands which could be worked or used without the need to pay rent.

== The Church in the Wood ==
The so-called Church in the Wood was built by the Reverend Alfred Caesar Bishop in 1883 for the farm workers of Bramdean Common. The church later became used by Romany families, who camped on the Common, and practised charcoal burning on the land. It is built of corrugated iron and took five weeks to construct. The church is still in good condition and is used occasionally for religious ceremonies. An arrangement of Shepherds Crowns by the gate of the church also shows the date of construction.

It was here in 1993 that the Dongas road protest group moved after being driven from Twyford Down by bulldozers.
