= The Wake (novel) =

2014 novel by Paul Kingsnorth

- First edition
- Author: Paul Kingsnorth
- Language: Anglish
- Series: Buckmaster trilogy
- Genre: Historical fiction
- Set in: The Lincolnshire Fens during the Norman Invasion
- Publisher: Unbound Digital
- Publication date: April 30, 2015
- Publication place: United Kingdom
- Pages: 384
- Awards: Gordon Burn Prize 2014 (won); The Bookseller Industry Book of the Year Award 2015 (won); Goldsmiths Prize (shortlisted); Man Booker Prize 2014 (longlisted); Desmond Elliott Prize (longlisted); Folio Prize (longlisted)
- ISBN: 978-1-908-71786-3
- Website: unbound.com/books/the-wake

The Wake is a 2014 debut novel by British author Paul Kingsnorth. Written in an imaginary language, a hybrid of Old English and Modern English, it tells of Buccmaster of Holland, an Anglo-Saxon freeman forced to come to terms with the effects of the Norman Invasion of 1066, during which his wife and sons were killed. He begins a guerrilla war against the Norman invaders in the Lincolnshire Fens.

Kingsnorth financed the work through crowdfunding on the platform Unbound. After not receiving support through a mainstream publisher, he did not initially expect a large response to his work. However, the book was longlisted for the 2014 Man Booker Prize and won the 2014 Gordon Burn Prize. The film rights were acquired by the actor and director Mark Rylance, who also read a section of the book in 2014 at the Hay Festival.

== See also ==
- Anglish
