= Dougald Hine =

British writer (born 1977)

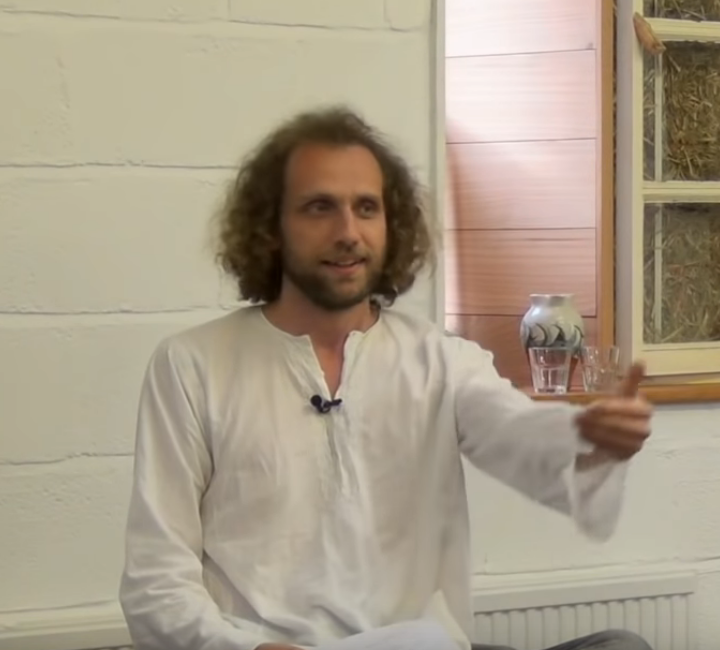
- Dougald Hine in 2014
- Born: 1977 (age 48–49); Cambridge, England
- Education: Oxford University
- Occupation: Social entrepreneur

Dougald Hine (born 1977 in Cambridge, England) is a British author, editor and social entrepreneur. He co-founded School of Everything and The Dark Mountain Project, of which he is Director at Large. In 2011, he was named one of Britain's 50 top radicals by NESTA.

Hine went to school in Darlington, and studied English literature at Oxford University. Following his first degree, he studied broadcast journalism at Sheffield Hallam and then spent four years as a BBC journalist (2002-2005). From 2005 to 2006, he lived and worked for a year in China's turbulent and far western province of Xinjiang. He has been involved in a number of projects and initiatives. Hine noticed two blog posts written by Paul Kingsnorth in 2007, one a rant in which Kingsnorth announced his abandonment of journalism, and one in which Kingsnorth expressed satisfaction at the failure of an international climate change meeting. Hine and Kingsnorth exchanged emails, and in 2008 they met in a pub. Following their exchanges and meetings, they published Uncivilization: The Dark Mountain Manifesto in 2009.

In 2012, he left London for Sweden. Since 2015, he has been working with the National Swedish Touring Theatre (Riksteatern) and as associate of the Centre for Environment and Development Studies (CEMUS) at Uppsala University.

Together with Anna Björkman, Hine founded a school called HOME, a gathering place and a learning community for those who are drawn to the work of regrowing a living culture.

In 2021 Hine together with Geska Helena Brecevic hosted a digital roundtable on artistic livelihoods and their long-term sustainability Making a Living - Making a life. There Hine shared some thoughts and questions about artistic livelihoods and their long-term sustainability, drawing on his experiences as co-founder of the Dark Mountain Project and a school called HOME, as well as his work as leader of artistic development at the National Swedish Touring Theater (Riksteatern).

== Projects ==
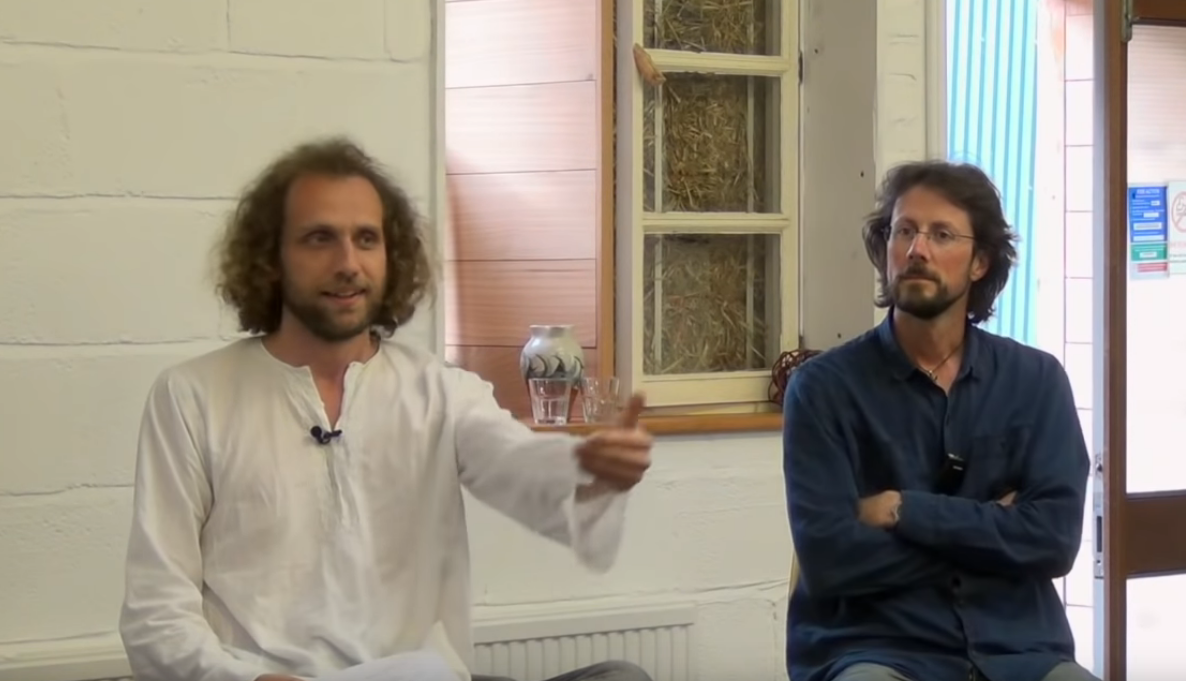
Hine and Kingsnorth providing a five-year retrospective on the Dark Mountain Project

- Pick Me Up (2004-6) was a weekly email newsletter intending to inspire people, through storytelling, to do something other than check their e-mail on Friday afternoons.
- The London School of Art & Business (2006). The group involved went on to found School of Everything.
- School of Everything was an internet startup intended to connect people who can teach with people who want to learn.
- The Dark Mountain Project (2009–present), has been one of his most important projects involving a manifesto, an extensive website, an annual festival run in collaboration with Paul Kingsnorth. The Dark Mountain project has resulted in three anthologies co-edited by Hine.
- The Spacemakers Agency (2009–present) was the first project in the re-development of Brixton Village, and there have been a number of related projects since including the West Norwood Festival.
- New Public Thinking (started 2010), a blog site which created a new space for public discourse and analysis aiming for a "better public discourse", resulting in an anthology of writings "Despatches from the Invisible Revolution".

== Books ==
- Dark Mountain: Issue 4 (2013) edited with Paul Kingsnorth and AJ Odasso.
- The Crossing of Two Lines (2013) with Performing Pictures, Elemental Editions
- Dark Mountain: Issue 3 (2012) edited with Paul Kingsnorth and AJ Odasso.
- Despatches from the Invisible Revolution (2012) edited with Keith Kahn-Harris.
- Dark Mountain: Issue 2 (2011) edited with Paul Kingsnorth and AJ Odasso.
- Dark Mountain: Issue 1 (2010) edited with Paul Kingsnorth and AJ Odasso.
- COMMONSense (2009) with Anne-Marie Culhane & Access Space.
- Uncivilisation: The Dark Mountain Manifesto (2009) with Paul Kingsnorth.
- At work in the ruins - Finding our place in the time of science, climate change, pandemics & all the other emergencies (2023) ISBN 9781645021841
