= Paul Kingsnorth =

English writer and environmentalist (born 1972)

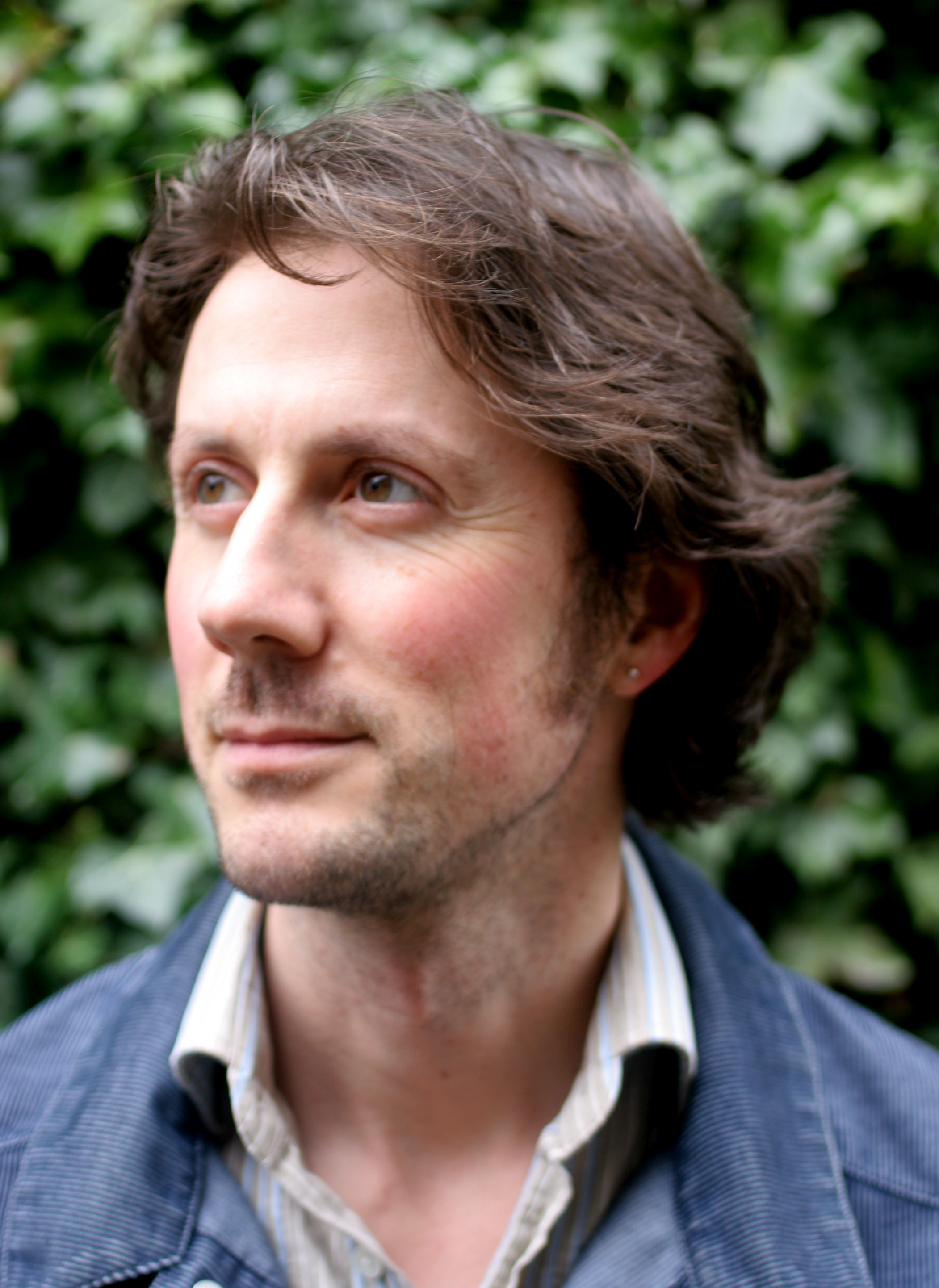
- Kingsnorth in 2011
- Born: 20 October 1972 (age 53); Worcester, England
- Education: St Anne's College, Oxford
- Occupation: Writer
- Known for: Novelist, writer, poet, environmentalist
- Website: paulkingsnorth.net

Paul Kingsnorth (born 20 October 1972) is an English writer who lives in the west of Ireland. He is a former deputy editor of The Ecologist and a co-founder of the Dark Mountain Project.

Kingsnorth's nonfiction writing tends to address macro themes like environmentalism, globalisation, and the challenges posed to humanity by civilisation-level trends. His fiction, notably the Buccmaster Trilogy, tends to be mythological and multi-layered.

== Early life and education ==
Kingsnorth spent his childhood in southern England with two younger brothers (one went on to work with Friends of the Earth, the other for Citibank). His father was a passionate Thatcherite, a businessman, and a mechanical engineer. Kingsnorth describes his father's background as "working-class," and he says that his father pushed Kingsnorth to go to university. He was the first in his family to do so.

Kingsnorth was educated at the Royal Grammar School, High Wycombe, and St Anne's College, Oxford, where he studied modern history. During this period he became involved in the Dongas road protest group at sites including Twyford Down, Solsbury Hill, and the M11 link road protest in east London. After chaining himself to a bridge alongside fifty others, Kingsnorth was arrested, an event that solidified the importance of protest for him. At Oxford, Kingsnorth edited the University's longest-running student newspaper, Cherwell.

== Career ==
With his student newspaper background, he started working on the comment desk of The Independent in 1994. But he found this work frivolous and uninspiring, so after less than a year Kingsnorth left to join the environmental campaign group EarthAction. He has subsequently worked as commissioning editor for openDemocracy, as a publications editor for Greenpeace and, between 1999 and 2001, as deputy editor of The Ecologist. He was named one of Britain's "top ten troublemakers" by the New Statesman magazine in 2001. In 2020, he was called "England's greatest living writer" by Aris Roussinos.

In 2004, he was one of the founders of the Free West Papua Campaign, which campaigns for the secession of the provinces of Papua and West Papua from Indonesia, where Kingsnorth was made an honorary member of the Lani tribe in 2001.

=== The Dark Mountain Project ===
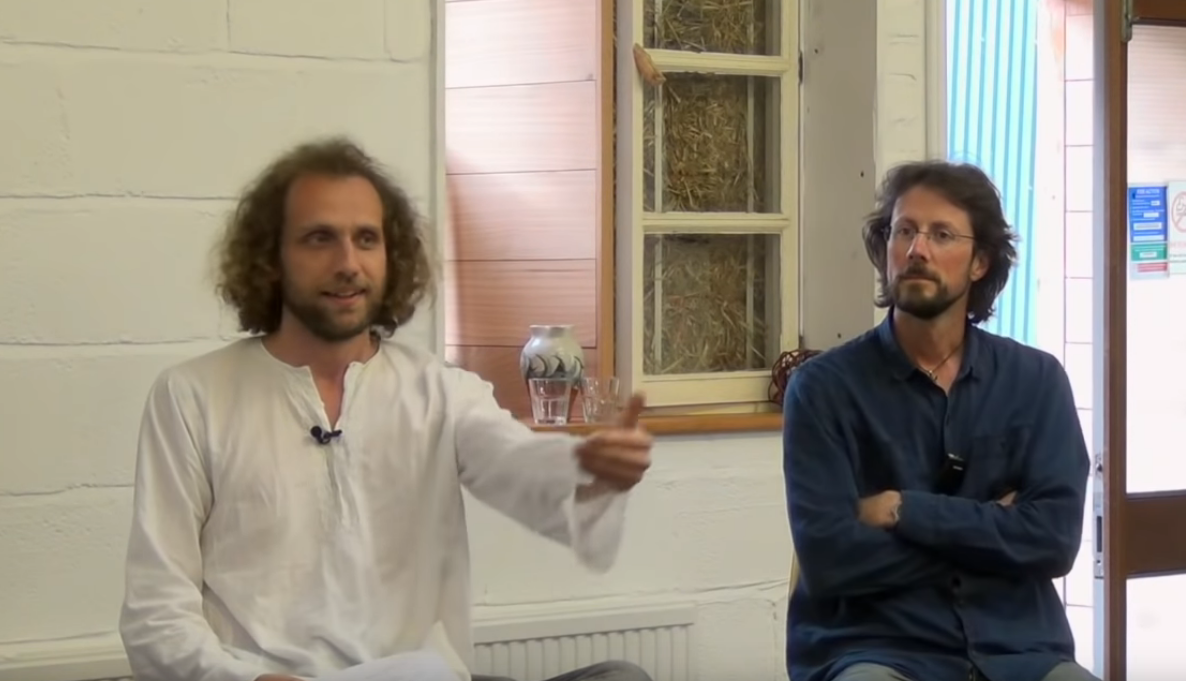
Hine and Kingsnorth providing a five-year retrospective on the Dark Mountain Project

Kingsnorth announced retirement from journalism in late 2007 in a blog post. In 2009, with writer and social activist Dougald Hine, Kingsnorth founded the Dark Mountain Project, "a network of writers, artists, and thinkers who have stopped believing the stories our civilisation tells itself". Since 2009 it has run a series of summer festivals and smaller events, produced bi-annual anthologies of "uncivilised" writing and art, and built up an international collection of writers and artists who aim to "offer up a challenge to the foundations of our civilisation". One Uncivilization festival described by the New York Times in 2014 included sessions on contemporary nature writing, a panel describing criticisms of psychiatric care, a reading by Kingsnorth from his book The Wake, and a midnight ritual. The ritual involved the burning of a wicker effigy of a tree. He was one of the project's directors until stepping down in 2017.

=== Writing ===
After travelling through Mexico, West Papua, Genoa in Italy, and Brazil, Kingsnorth wrote his first book in 2003, One No, Many Yeses. The book explored how globalisation played a role in destroying historic cultures around the world. The book was not successful on initial printing, in part because it came in the first week of the Iraq war. It was published in 6 languages in 13 countries.

Kingsnorth's second book, Real England, was published by Portobello Books in 2008. In this book, he reflected on how those same forces of globalisation affected England, his own country, in the homogenization of culture. This was Kingsnorth's first successful book, resulting in reviews by all major newspapers and citations in speeches by both David Cameron and the archbishop of Canterbury. Writing the book involved travelling for months to interview Englishmen working in traditional institutions, including pubs, shops, and farms. The research process left Kingsnorth ambivalent after facing the forces of development, privatization, and conglomeration.

He has contributed to The Guardian, The Independent, The Daily Telegraph, Daily Express, Le Monde, New Statesman, London Review of Books, Granta, The Ecologist, New Internationalist, The Big Issue, Adbusters, BBC Radio 4, BBC Radio 2, BBC Four, ITV, and Resonance FM.

His first collection of poetry, Kidland and Other Poems, was published by Salmon in 2011. In 2012, he won the Wenlock Prize for "Vodadahue Mountain". His second collection, Songs From The Blue River, was published by Salmon in 2018.

His first novel, The Wake, published via crowdfunding by Unbound in April 2014, was longlisted for the Man Booker Prize and the Folio Prize, shortlisted for the Goldsmiths Prize, and won the Gordon Burn Prize. Film rights to the novel were sold to a consortium led by the actor Mark Rylance and the former president of HBO Films Colin Callender.

Kingsnorth's second novel, Beast, was published in 2016 by Faber and Faber and was shortlisted for the Encore Award for the Best Second Novel in 2017. His third novel, Alexandria, was published by Faber in 2021, completing a loose thematic trilogy, beginning with The Wake, which was eventually christened the Buccmaster Trilogy.

In 2022, Kingsnorth self-published The Vaccine Moment, a collection of his essays criticising public health mitigation of COVID-19.

=== Public lectures ===
In 2024, Kingsnorth delivered the thirty-seventh Erasmus Lecture titled Against Christian Civilization. Hosted by First Things magazine and the Institute on Religion and Public Life, the lecture explored the relationship between Christianity and modernity, questioning whether the West’s civilizational project has distorted the faith it claims to uphold. Kingsnorth reflected on themes of conversion, culture, and the spiritual costs of technological progress, arguing for a return to a more rooted, sacramental understanding of Christian life and the created order.

== Conversion to Orthodox Christianity ==
In January 2020, Kingsnorth converted to Christianity and was baptised into the Romanian Orthodox Church. He had previously explored Zen Buddhism and Wicca, which he later described as inadequate responses to the cultural and ecological crises he perceived. Kingsnorth has said that his decision to become a Christian was not primarily the result of rational argument, but of personal experiences, including vivid dreams and what he characterized as being "dragged out" of his former beliefs. He wrote about his spiritual journey and conversion to Christianity in a June 2021 essay in First Things.

== Selected writings ==
=== Books ===
Nonfiction

- One No, Many Yeses (2003)
- Real England (2008)
- Uncivilization (2009)
- Confessions of a Recovering Environmentalist (2017)
- Savage Gods (2020)
- Against The Machine (2025)

Fiction

- The Wake (2014)
- Beast (2017)
- Alexandria (2020)

Poetry

- Kidland and Other Poems (2011)
- Songs from the Blue River (2018)

=== As editor ===
- Dark Mountain: issue 1, (2010, Dark Mountain Project) ISBN 0-9564960-0-8
- Dark Mountain: issue 2, (2011, Dark Mountain Project) ISBN 0-9564960-1-6
- Dark Mountain: issue 3, (2012, Dark Mountain Project) ISBN 0-9564960-2-4
- Dark Mountain: issue 4, (2013, Dark Mountain Project)
- Dark Mountain: issue 5, (2014, Dark Mountain Project)
- Dark Mountain: issue 6, (2014, Dark Mountain Project)
- The World-Ending Fire: the essential Wendell Berry, (2017, Penguin Press) ISBN 0-2412792-0-8
