= Uncivilization (manifesto) =

2009 work by Dougald Hine and Paul Kingsnorth

Uncivilization: The Dark Mountain Manifesto is the manifesto released in 2009 by Paul Kingsnorth and Dougald Hine to signal the beginning of The Dark Mountain Project.

== Summary ==
Uncivilization argues against the idea that technological solutions to climate change are possible. Instead, it suggests that notions of 'progress' should be re-evaluated. The book primarily addresses writers and artists, rather than suggesting political action on climate change. Nor do they describe what they expect following their suggested 'collapse.'

== Reception ==
A variety of critics criticized the bleakness in the Uncivilization project. Erica Wagner describes the general reaction following Uncivilization's publishing, noting that "[Kingsnorth] and his co-founder, Dougald Hine, were accused by some of a bleak nihilism, of walking away from the problems that face the planet." Writing for The New Statesman, English philosopher John Gray critiques the authors' idea of a 'cleansing collapse,' writing that "a scenario of this kind is not remotely apocalyptic. It is no more than history as usual, together with new technologies and ongoing climate change. The notion that the conflicts of history have been left behind is truly apocalyptic, and Kingsnorth and Hine are right to target business-as-usual philosophies of progress. When they posit a cleansing catastrophe, however, they, too, succumb to apocalyptic thinking." The New York Times notes that the work was highly criticized, with Kingsnorth, Hine, and admirers of the work being labeled as "doomers" or "nihilists". The Times highlights that "One critic, a sustainability advocate, published an essay in The Ecologist — a magazine Kingsnorth once helped run — comparing Dark Mountaineers to the complacent characters in Douglas Adams’s novel 'The Restaurant at the End of the Universe': 'Diners [who] enjoyed watching the obliteration of life, the universe and everything whilst enjoying a nice steak.'"

== Context ==
Kingsnorth and Hine met after Hine reached out towards Kingsnorth about one of his blog posts. They proceeded to exchange ideas and publications, including works of Robinson Jeffers, a celebrated writer of the 1930s and 1940s who wrote poetry in the style Jeffers describe as 'Inhumanism.' Jeffers' works had a major influence on Uncivilization.

== Influence ==
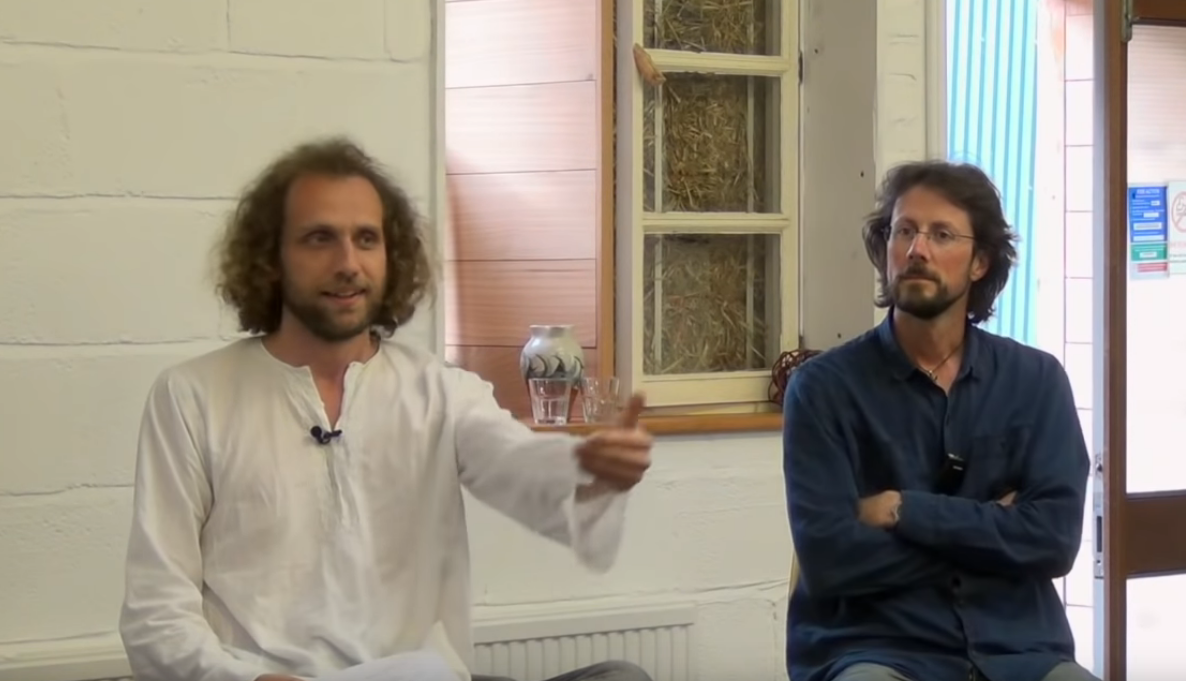
Paul Kingsnorth and Dougald Hine in a five-year retrospective on the Dark Mountain Project

Uncivilization was not much noticed on release, with only 500 printed copies for its first edition. However, attention grew over time. The text has been included on college reading lists, and festivals centered on the concept of uncivilization were held with hundreds of attendees.
