= Dongas road protest group =

Protest group in England

The Dongas Tribe was a collection of road protesters and travellers in England, noted for their occupation of Twyford Down outside Winchester, Hampshire. The name Dongas comes from the Matabele word for "gully", given by Winchester locals to the deep drovers' tracks on Twyford Down.

John Vidal, writing in The Guardian in 2012, said of The Dongas that "the 15-20 urban youths who camped out to try to defend Twyford Down in 1992 are recognised to have fired up British environmental protest and kickstarted a major shift in green attitudes in both government and the public."

== History ==
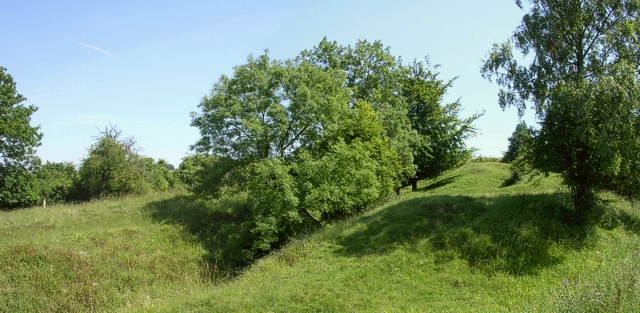
An example of a gully, 'the dongas', on Twyford Down, from where the tribe took their name

The Twyford Down protest was a protest against the M3 motorway extension which destroyed some rich ecological sites, one of the very few habitats of the Chalkhill Blue butterfly and six species of rare orchid, and ancient monuments there (SSSI and Scheduled Ancient Monument). The Conservative government was planning to construct a new roadway through the area.

Following "Yellow Wednesday", when hordes of police and security guards invaded the camp to bulldoze the area, the Dongas Tribe left Twyford Down for Bramdean Common. Earth First!, who had been heavily involved in the setting up and support of the camp and actions, continued the protests and restarted a camp in Plague Pits Valley.

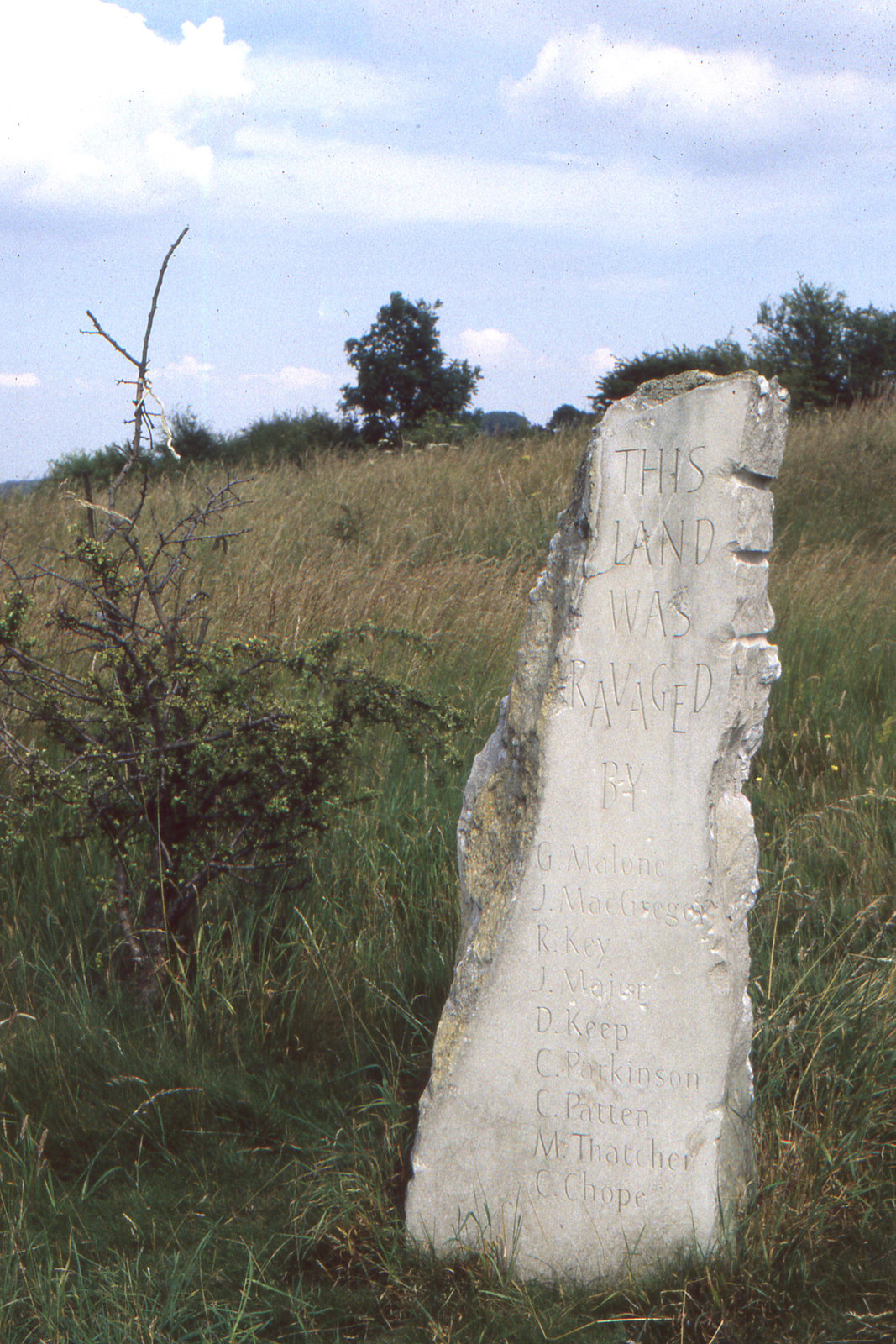
Memorial stone on Twyford Down in 1999

They constituted about twenty people. Of them, seven were sent to prison in 1993 for breaking an injunction. In one incident, around fifty protesters chained themselves to a bridge, leading to the arrest of some. At least one protester (Paul Kingsnorth) subsequently sued the police and received a $5000 settlement.

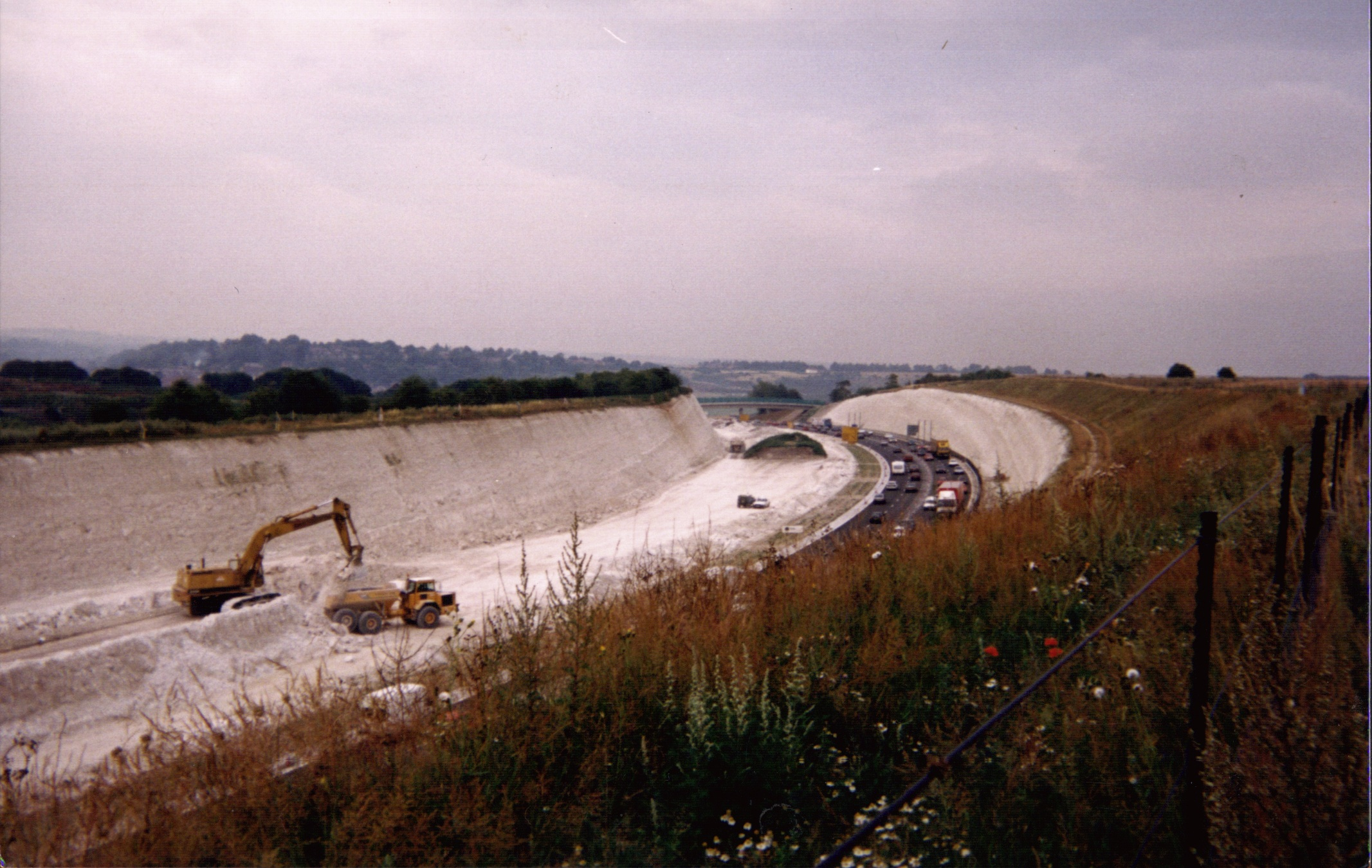
The cutting at Twyford Down, during construction of the M3 motorway, 1994

Some of the 'original Dongas' (as they became called) of the mid-1990s were musicians who made a living by busking, sometimes using traditional music from Brittany.

The first child born in the Dongas tribe, to Rosie Lambert, was named May Brigit "Donga" Lambert and was born on 1 May 1994.

In late 2012, original members of the Dongas, as well as hundreds of others, returned to the hillside on the protest's 20th anniversary. They expressed warnings about the government's more than forty new road plans.

== Influence ==
The Dongas road protests inspired a major change in green attitudes among both the public and the government, radicalizing a generation of British youth. Among them, Paul Kingsnorth of The Dark Mountain Project credits his arrest at Twyford Down as his impetus for engaging in further protests.

== See also ==
- Direct Action
- Rebecca Lush
