= The Uninhabitable Earth =

2017 magazine article by David Wallace-Wells

- Cover page of The Uninhabitable Earth
- Author: David Wallace-Wells
- Genre: Science
- Published in: New York
- Publication date: July 10, 2017

"The Uninhabitable Earth" is an article by American journalist David Wallace-Wells published in the July 10, 2017, issue of New York magazine. The long-form article depicts a worst-case scenario of what might happen in the near-future due to global warming. The story was the most-read article in the history of the magazine.

The article became the inspiration for The Uninhabitable Earth: Life After Warming, a book-length treatment of the ideas explored in the original essay.

== Content ==
The article opens with a warning:

[Global warming] is, I promise, worse than you think. If your anxiety about global warming is dominated by fears of sea level rise, you are barely scratching the surface of what terrors are possible, even within the lifetime of a teenager today. And yet the swelling seas — and the cities they will drown — have so dominated the picture of global warming, and so overwhelmed our capacity for climate panic, that they have occluded our perception of other threats, many much closer at hand. Rising oceans are bad, in fact very bad; but fleeing the coastline will not be enough.

The article explores the severe and potentially catastrophic impacts of climate change. Rising temperatures could make parts of the Earth uninhabitable, especially in tropical regions where high humidity and heat could be lethal. Thawing Arctic permafrost could release massive amounts of carbon and methane, accelerating global warming. Rising oceans threaten to flood coastal cities and displace millions of people. Climate change could drastically reduce crop yields, leading to widespread food shortages. Increased temperatures and changing ecosystems could lead to the spread of diseases and health issues. The economic consequences of climate change could be severe, with significant losses in GDP and increased poverty. Climate change could exacerbate conflicts and force large-scale migrations as people flee uninhabitable areas. The oceans are absorbing more carbon dioxide, leading to acidification that threatens marine life. The article emphasizes the urgency of taking aggressive action to mitigate these effects and prevent the worst-case scenarios from becoming reality.

== General ==
On November 20, 2017, NYU's Arthur L. Carter Journalism Institute hosted a two-hour-long conversation between Wallace-Wells and Michael E. Mann to discuss the controversy around the article.

Accompanying the article are a series of extended interviews with scientists. These include paleontologist Peter Ward, climatologist Michael E. Mann, oceanographer Wallace Smith Broecker, climatologist James Hansen, and scientist Michael Oppenheimer. In addition, an annotated edition of the article was published online that includes inline footnotes.

In February 2019, Wallace-Wells published The Uninhabitable Earth: Life After Warming. The book was excerpted in The Guardian.

== Reception ==
The story received immediate criticism from the climate change community along two fronts: the piece is too pessimistic, and it contains some factual errors. The non-governmental organization Climate Feedback summarized reviews by dozens of professional scientists as follows:

The reviewers found that some statements in this complex article do misrepresent research on the topic, and some others lack the necessary context to be clearly understood by the reader. Many other explanations in the article are correct, but readers are likely left with an overall conclusion that is exaggerated compared to our best scientific understanding.

Jason Samenow referred to it as a "climate doom piece" because Wallace-Wells presents some of the worst-case scenarios without admitting that they are "remote" possibilities, and without exploring the more-likely outcomes, which are still very serious. With reference to factual errors, Michael Mann and several others specifically criticized the description of Arctic methane emissions. In his conversation with Mann at NYU, Wallace-Wells noted that he would not include comments on methane release if he were to write the piece again.

Some journalists defended the science, saying that it is mostly correct. Kevin Drum said: "I haven't seen any good evidence for serious factual errors." Emily Atkin said: "The complaints about the science in Wallace-Wells's article are mostly quibbles." Robinson Meyer of The Atlantic called it an "unusually specific and severe depiction of what global warming will do to the planet." Susan Matthews, writing in Slate, said "The instantly viral piece might be the Silent Spring of our time". The major criticism is that David Wallace-Wells was trying to scare people. This theme was then explored by journalists and commentators, with some saying that they thought fear was necessary, given the reality of the problem, while others thought that scaring people was counter-productive. For example, Eric Holthaus said that "scaring the shit out of [people] is a really bad strategy" for getting them to want to address climate change.

In a later interview, Wallace-Wells said that "it didn't seem plausible to me that there was more risk at scaring people too much than there was at not scaring them enough ... my feeling was, and is, if there's a one percent chance that we've set off a chain reaction that could end the human race, then that should be something that the public knows and thinks about."
