= The Uninhabitable Earth (book) =

2019 book about climate change

- First edition
- Author: David Wallace-Wells
- Language: English
- Genre: non-fiction
- Publisher: Tim Duggan Books
- Publication date: April 16, 2019
- Publication place: United States
- Pages: 320
- ISBN: 978-0-525-57670-9

The Uninhabitable Earth: Life After Warming is a 2019 non-fiction book by David Wallace-Wells about the consequences of global warming. It was inspired by his New York magazine article "The Uninhabitable Earth" (2017).

== Synopsis ==
The book fleshes out Wallace-Wells' original New York magazine piece in more detail, dovetailing into discussions surrounding various possibilities for Earth's future across a spectrum of predicted future temperature ranges. Wallace-Wells' argues that even with active intervention, the effects of climate change will have catastrophic impacts across multiple spheres: rising sea levels, extreme weather events, extinctions, disease outbreaks, fires, droughts, famines, earthquakes, volcanic eruptions, floods, and increased geopolitical conflict, among other calamities.

While the book is not focused on solutions, it recognizes solutions exist to prevent the worst of the damages: "a carbon tax and the political apparatus to aggressively phase out dirty energy; a new approach to agricultural practices and a shift away from beef and dairy in the global diet; and public investment in green energy and carbon capture".

== Reception ==
The book has been both praised and criticized for its dramatic depictions of future life on Earth. As The Economist stated, "Some readers will find Mr. Wallace-Wells’s outline of possible futures alarmist. He is indeed alarmed. You should be, too." It was also reviewed in The Guardian, The New York Times, and Slate. A review in The Irish Times by John Gibbons was critical of the book's primary focus on effects of climate change on humans rather than also covering impacts on other species.

In The New Climate War, the climatologist Michael Mann dedicates 12 pages to comment on The Uninhabitable Earth. About the book, he notably writes that "while some of the blatant errors that marked the original article were largely gone, the pessimistic – and, at times, downright doomist – framing remained, as did exaggerated descriptions that fed the doomist narrative".

== Television adaptation ==
In January 2020, it was reported that The Uninhabitable Earth would be adapted into an anthology series on HBO Max. Each episode will be about the dangers of climate change. Adam McKay will serve as the executive producer.

== Publications ==
- Wallace-Wells, David (February 19, 2019). The Uninhabitable Earth: Life after Warming. New York, USA: Tim Duggan Books. ISBN 978-0-525-57670-9. Hardcover edition.
- Wallace-Wells, David (March 17, 2020). The Uninhabitable Earth: Life after Warming. New York, USA: Tim Duggan Books. ISBN 978-0-525-57671-6. Paperback edition.
