= David Wallace-Wells =

American journalist (born 1982)

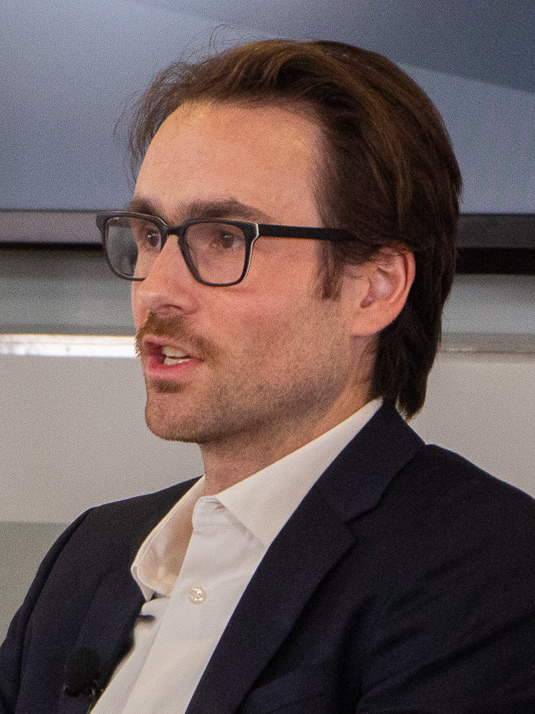
- Wallace-Wells in 2019
- Born: 1982 (age 43–44); New York City, U.S.
- Education: Brown University
- Occupation: Journalist
- Notable work: The Uninhabitable Earth
- Children: 2

David Wallace-Wells (born 1982) is an American journalist known for his writings on climate change. He wrote the 2017 essay "The Uninhabitable Earth"; the essay was published in New York as a long-form article and was the most-read article in the history of the magazine.

Wells later expanded the article into a 2019 book of the same title. At the time, he was deputy editor of New York Magazine and extensively covered the climate crisis and the COVID-19 pandemic. In March 2022 he was hired by The New York Times to write a weekly newsletter and contribute to The New York Times Magazine.

== Early life and education ==
David Wallace-Wells was born in 1982, in the Inwood neighborhood of Manhattan, and then spent his later childhood and teenage years in Riverdale. His maternal grandparents were German Jews who fled Nazi Germany in 1939. His father was an academic and his mother worked as a kindergarten teacher in East Harlem. His brother, Benjamin Wallace-Wells, is a staff writer for The New Yorker. Wallace-Wells attended the University of Chicago for one year and then transferred to and ultimately graduated from Brown University in 2004 with a degree in history.

== Personal life ==
He is married to Risa Needleman. The couple live in Lower Manhattan and have two daughters.

== Career ==
Wallace-Wells is currently on staff at the New York Times with a weekly opinion newsletter and monthly long-form essays in The New York Times Magazine. His work has appeared in New York magazine, where he was the Deputy Editor for many years. He also writes for The Guardian. He was a 2019 National Fellow at New America. On July 17, 2019, Wallace-Wells appeared on an episode of The Doctor's Farmacy, a video produced by functional medicine practitioner Mark Hyman.

=== Climate writing ===
Since 2017, Wallace-Wells has written extensively about climate change in New York magazine. Wallace-Wells has said that he is optimistic about the earth's environmental future but remains cautious. He has said that no matter the degree of environmental damage, "it will always be the case that the next decade could contain more warming, and more suffering, or less warming and less suffering."

His best known work is "The Uninhabitable Earth", an article published July 9, 2017 in New York magazine. Although the essay received mixed to negative criticism from many scientists, it was considered an impactful work by some reviewers. Wallace-Wells later turned the work into a full-length book of the same name, published in 2019. Both works are characterized by speculation regarding climate change's potential to dramatically impact human life, which Wallace-Wells describes in "meticulous and terrifying detail". Writing in The Guardian in 2021, Wallace‑Wells argues that the scale of climate change adaptation required globally is unprecedented, and Wallace‑Wells opines that "the world's vanguard infrastructure is failing in today's climate, which is the most benign we will ever see again".

=== Writing about Anthony Fauci ===
In a column in the New York Times on August 5, 2026, Wallace-Wells called Dr. Fauci's refusing to answer questions from Senator Paul's investigating committee and citing his constitutional rights under the Fifth Amendment "cowardly".

== Works ==
- The Uninhabitable Earth. New York: Tim Duggan, 2019. ISBN 9781984826589.

== See also ==
- New Yorkers in journalism
